= Grünfeld =

Grünfeld, Grunfeld, or Gruenfeld may refer to:

== People ==
- A. Tom Grunfeld (born 1946), SUNY Distinguished Teaching Professor at Empire State College
- Alfred Grünfeld (1852–1924), Austrian pianist and composer
- Berthold Grünfeld (1932–2007), Norwegian psychiatrist, sexologist, and professor of social medicine
- Dan Grunfeld (born 1984), American-Romanian professional basketball player
- Deborah H. Gruenfeld, American social psychologist
- Ernie Grunfeld (born 1955), American former professional basketball player
- Ernst Grünfeld (1893–1962), Austrian chess grandmaster and chess writer
- Heinrich Grünfeld (1855–1931), Bohemian-Austrian violoncellist
- Henry Grunfeld (1904–1999), merchant banker
- Isidor Grunfeld (1900–1975), dayan and author
- Nina Grunfeld (born 1954), British writer, journalist, public speaker, and entrepreneur
- Yehuda Gruenfeld (born 1956), Israeli chess Grandmaster
- Yehuda Grunfeld (1929/1930–1960), econometrician in the late 1950s

== Other ==
- Grünfeld Defence, a chess opening

== See also ==
- Greenfeld
- Greenfield (disambiguation)
- Gryunfeld (disambiguation)
