= Greenstein =

Greenstein may refer to:

== People ==
- Barry Greenstein (born 1954), American poker player
- Daniel Greenstein, American librarian and education official
- Daphna Greenstein (born 1952), Israeli architect
- Fred Greenstein (1930–2018), American political scientist
- Gary Greenstein, American periodontist
- Jeff Greenstein (born 1963), American television writer, producer and director
- Jesse L. Greenstein (1909–2002), American astronomer
- Joe Greenstein (1893–1977), Polish-American strongman
- Jonathan Greenstein (born 1967), American antique authentication expert
- Judd Greenstein (born 1979), American composer
- Linda R. Greenstein (born 1950), American attorney and politician
- Mike Greenstein (1920–2016), American strength athlete
- Robert Greenstein (born 1946), American lobbyist and government official
- Scott Greenstein (born 1959), American businessman
- Shane Greenstein, American economist
- Tony Greenstein, British left-wing activist and writer

== Other ==
- 4612 Greenstein, a main-belt asteroid

== See also ==
- Grinstein, a surname
