= Greenfeld =

Greenfeld (Yiddish: גרינפעלד, Russian: Гринфельд) is a surname, which may refer to:

- Alon Greenfeld (born 1964), Israeli chess grandmaster
- Boruch Greenfeld (1872–1956), rabbi and Torah scholar
- Josh Greenfeld (1928–2018), author and screenwriter mostly known for his screenplay for the 1974 film Harry and Tonto
- Karl Taro Greenfeld (born 1956), journalist and author known primarily for his articles on life in modern Asia
- Liah Greenfeld (born 1954), director of the Institute for the Advancement of the Social Sciences at Boston University
- Sherman Greenfeld (born 1962), Canadian racquetball player

== Grinfeld ==
- Alla Grinfeld (1953–2020), Russian-American woman grandmaster chess player
- Nadejda Grinfeld (1887–1918), Bessarabian politician
- Pavel Grinfeld (born 1974), applied mathematician

== Gruenfeld ==
- Yehuda Gruenfeld (born 1956), Israeli chess player

== Grynfeld ==
- Izaak Grynfeld (1912–?), Polish–Israeli chess master

== See also ==
- Grünfeld
- Greenfield (disambiguation)
- Greenbaum
- Greenberg
- Greenstein (disambiguation)
- Greenwald (disambiguation)
