= Robert Lyon =

Robert Lyon may refer to:

- Robert Menli Lyon (1789–1874), early settler in Western Australia
- Robert Lyon (politician) (1829–1888), Canadian politician in Ontario
- Robert Adam Lyon (1829–1901), Canadian businessman and politician
- Robert Lyon (duellist) (1812–1833), last Canadian killed in a duel
- Robert Lyon (journalist) (1810–1858), English-American journalist and newspaper editor and publisher
- Robert W. Lyon (1842–1904), American politician, mayor of Pittsburgh, Pennsylvania
- Robert Lyon (British Army officer) (1923–2019), British general
- Bob Lyon (born 1955), American politician from Kansas

== See also ==
- Robert Lyons (disambiguation)
