= Grinstein =

Grinstein is a surname. Notable people with the surname include:

- Elyse Grinstein (1929–2016), American architect and art collector
- Gerald Grinstein (born 1932), American businessman
- Gidi Grinstein, Israeli societal entrepreneur
- Hyman Grinstein, American educator and historian
- Stanley Grinstein (1927–2014), American businessman, master printer, arts collector and patron, philanthropist, and social activist

== See also ==
- Michal Grinstein-Weiss, American professor
