= Recognition signal =

Signal whereby a person, a ship, an airplane or something else is recognized

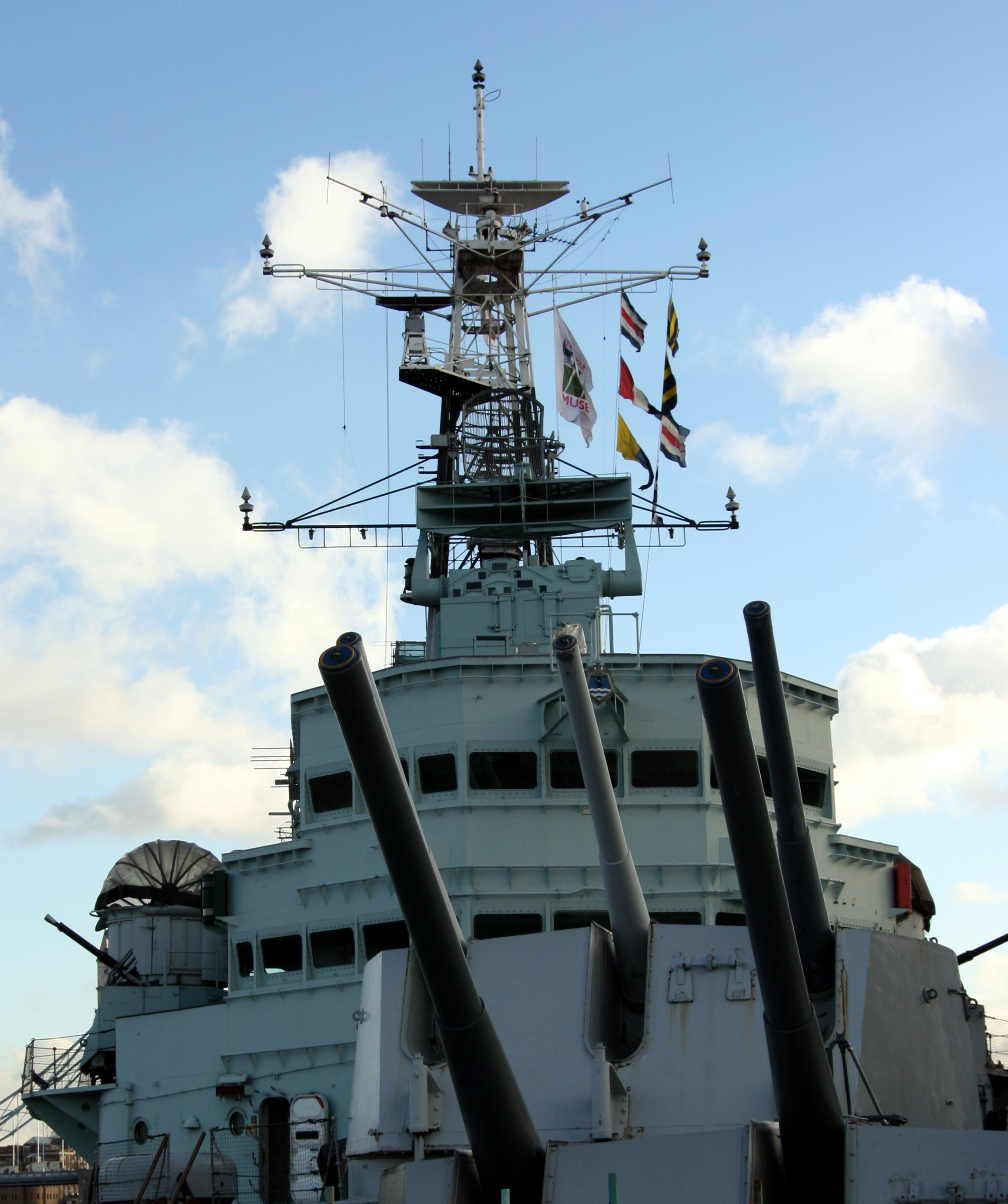
HMS Belfast (C35) using International maritime signal flags as a recognition signal

A recognition signal is a signal whereby a person, a ship, an airplane or something else is recognized. They can be used during war or can be used to help the police recognize each other during undercover operations.

== War ==
These signals are often used to recognize friends and enemies in a war. For military use these signals often use colored lights or the International marine signal flags.

== Police ==
Other uses of the signal include the police who sometimes use a recognition signal so that officers in uniform can recognize officers in normal clothing (undercover). The NYPD often use headbands, wristbands or colored clothing as recognition signals which are known as the "color of the day".

== See also ==
- Communication
- International Code of Signals
- Secret handshake
