= Gryunfeld =

Gryunfeld or Gryunfel’d may refer to:

- Həsənsu, Azerbaijan
- Vurğun, Azerbaijan
