= Greenbaum =

Greenbaum is a surname. Notable people with the surname include:

- Anne Greenbaum (born 1951), American applied mathematician
- Andrew Britt Greenbaum (1978–2017), American fraudster and spammer
- Daniel "Dan" Robert Greenbaum (born 1969), American volleyball player
- Denise Faye (born Denise Faye Greenbaum, 1963), American actress and choreographer
- Dorothea Greenbaum (1893–1986), American painter and sculptor
- Everett Greenbaum (1919–1999), American writer and actor
- Gus Greenbaum (1893–1958), American gangster
- Harrison Greenbaum (born 1986), American stand-up comedian and comedy writer
- Hyam Greenbaum (1901–1942), English conductor, violinist and composer
- Jim Greenbaum, American entrepreneur and philanthropist
- Joanne Greenbaum (born 1953), American artist
- Josh Greenbaum, American film director, screenwriter, and producer
- Jules Greenbaum (1867–1924), German film producer
- Kyla Greenbaum (1922–2017), British pianist and composer, sister of Hyam Greenbaum
- Leon Greenbaum (1866–1925), American socialist official, writer, lecturer, union organizer and political candidate
- Marty Greenbaum (1934–2020), American painter
- Matthew Greenbaum (born 1950), American musician, composer and author
- Michael Greenbaum, American rabbi and educator
- Mutz Greenbaum (1896–1968), German British cinematographer
- Norman Greenbaum (born 1942), American singer-songwriter
- Samuel Greenbaum (1854–1930), British-American lawyer and judge
- Sidney Greenbaum (1929–1996), British scholar of the English language and linguistics
- Stuart Greenbaum (born 1966), Australian composer and professor
- Susan Greenbaum, American professor

== Fictional characters ==
- Big Rosie Greenbaum from Laverne & Shirley
- Ben and Herschel Greenbaum from An American Pickle

== Greenebaum ==
- Elliot Greenebaum (born 1977), American film writer and director
- Hannah Greenebaum Solomon (1858–1942), American social reformer
- Henry Greenebaum (1833–1914), Jewish-American banker
- University of Maryland Greenebaum Cancer Center, named after Marlene and Stewart Greenebaum

== See also ==
- Peter Green, born: Peter Greenbaum, founder of the band Fleetwood Mac
- Mick Green (born: Michael Greenbaum), British rock and roll guitarist
- Grünbaum
