= Joe Greenstein =

American strongman (1893–1977)

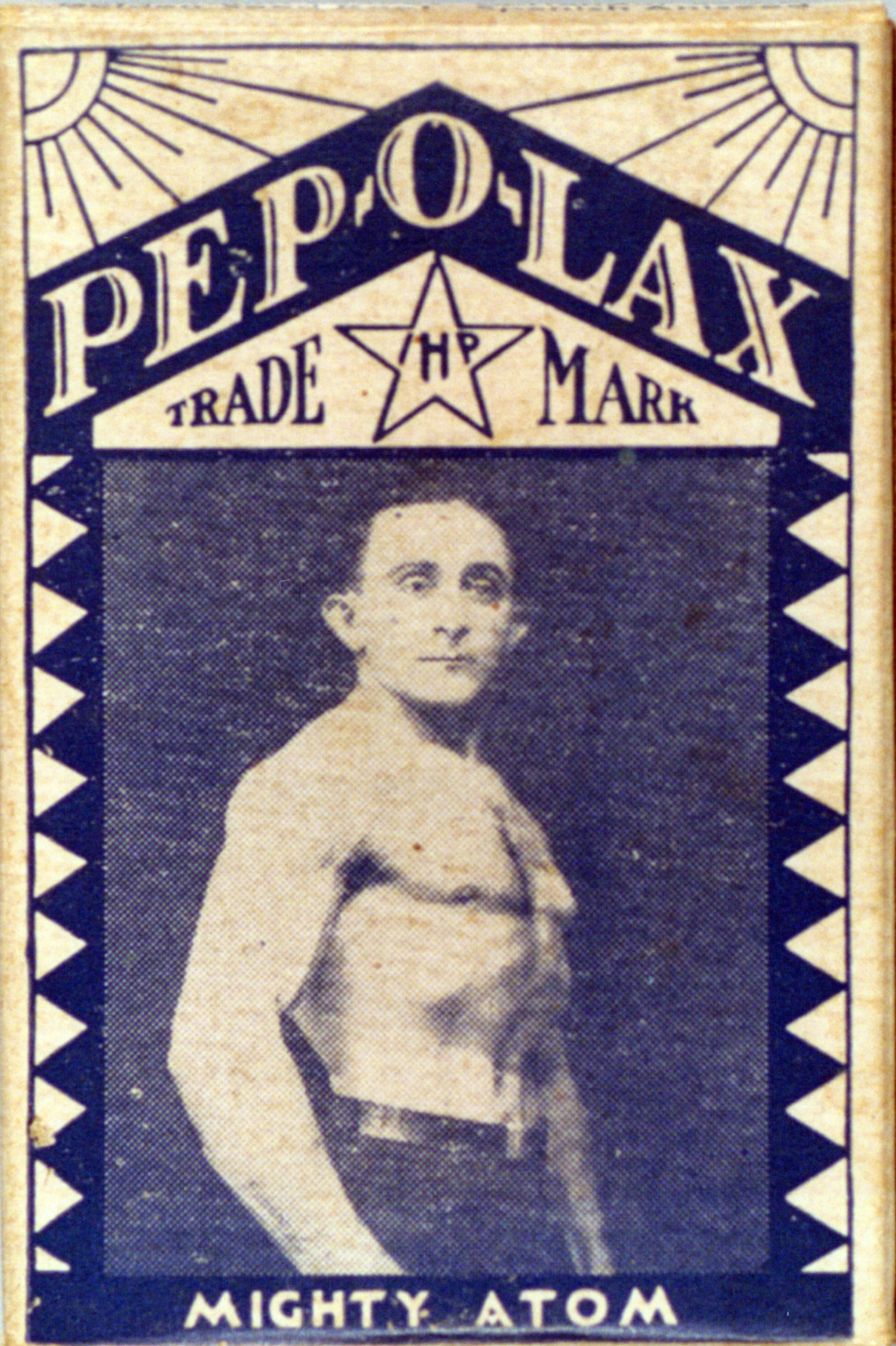
- Joe Greenstein depicted on a product he sold
- Born: January 2, 1893; Suwałki, Poland
- Died: October 8, 1977 (aged 84); New York City, New York, US
- Other name: The Mighty Atom
- Known for: Strongman
- Spouse: Leah Greenstein
- Children: 10, including Mike Greenstein

Joseph L. Greenstein (January 2, 1893 – October 8, 1977), better known as The Mighty Atom, was a 20th-century strongman known for highly unusual feats of strength and endurance.

== Life and career ==
=== Early life ===
Greenstein was born to a Jewish family in Suwałki, Poland, in 1893. As a child he suffered from respiratory ailments, and at age 14, a team of doctors predicted he would die from tuberculosis. Around that time, he became acquainted with a Russian circus strongman, Champion Volanko, who mentored Greenstein. Greenstein traveled with Volanko and the Issakoff Brothers Circus for eighteen months, learning the strongman's training regimen. After this, he returned to Poland and married his wife, Leah.

=== Career ===
He began his career as a wrestler. However, due in part to rising anti-Semitism in Eastern Europe, he then left for the United States. He first went to Galveston, Texas, working as a dockworker and oil field worker. He also wrestled professionally at this time as Kid Greenstein. In 1914, The Houston Daily Post reported that a friend of Greenstein accidentally shot him in the middle of the forehead. The report states the bullet did not enter his skull, and "flattened out against his forehead". This experience sparked Greenstein's interest in the mental powers associated with strength, and he gradually developed an array of strongman feats.

He was featured five times in Ripley's Believe It Or Not and in the 1976 Guinness Book of World Records. Two of Greenstein's feats included biting through an iron nail and bending iron horseshoes by hand. An iron nail and iron horseshoes are on display at the Weightlifting Hall of Fame in York, Pennsylvania.

Later in life, Greenstein sold coconut oil soaps and health elixirs at fairs and farmers' markets. He traveled in an old Model A truck with panels that opened to show his extensive collection of newsclippings and citations from civic leaders and organizations. New York City Mayor LaGuardia issued a proclamation, thanking Greenstein for showing his skills to the city's police department. Greenstein had volunteered to teach jujutsu techniques to members of the New York City auxiliary police during World War II, years before the technique became widespread in the United States.

Greenstein continued performing his strongman feats well into his eighties, giving his last performance at his great-grandchild's first birthday on May 11, 1977, at Madison Square Garden at the age of 84. He dazzled the audience by bending horseshoes and driving spikes through metal with the palm of his hand.

=== Personal life and death ===
Joe and Leah Greenstein had ten children.

Greenstein succumbed to cancer on October 8, 1977, at age 84.

== Legacy ==
The story of his life has been told by Ed Spielman in the book The Mighty Atom and the documentary film The Mighty Atom. He may be the inspiration for the fictional character of Al Pratt, a costumed crime-fighter who went by the alias of The Atom. Joe Greenstein's life and career are also the subject of the 2017 documentary The Mighty Atom.

Joe Greenstein's 93-year-old son Mike Greenstein appeared on America's Got Talent in 2014 and successfully pulled a 3,500-pound (1,600 kg) car with his teeth.
