= Grünbaum =

Grünbaum is a German surname meaning "green tree" and may refer to:

- Adolf Grünbaum (1923–2018), German-born philosopher of science
- Branko Grünbaum (1929–2018), Croatian-born mathematician
- Fritz Grünbaum (1880–1941), Austrian cabaret artist, operetta and pop song writer
- Max Grünbaum (1817–1898), German Orientalist
- Victor Gruen (born Grünbaum; 1903–1980), an Austrian commercial architect
- Yitzhak Gruenbaum (1879–1970), Polish-Israeli leader of the Zionism

== See also ==
- Greenbaum
