= Refund to Savings =

Low-income household program

Refund to Savings (R2S) is a program intended to help low-income households build savings and increase financial security.

The result of a collaboration between the Center for Social Development at Washington University in St. Louis, Duke University, and Intuit Inc, R2S is the largest savings experiment conducted in the United States to date. This initiative builds on Intuit's TurboTax Free File Alliance Online product, available for free to lower-income taxpayers, to reach thousands of households.

The goal of the initiative is to design and test a low-touch, scalable intervention that can transform the tax-refund windfall into savings to improve financial security. The intervention builds on existing infrastructure and integrates with normal financial behavior, so it can quickly and inexpensively be expanded to reach millions of American households.

== Key Researchers and Partners ==
The experiment was developed by economics professors Michal Grinstein-Weiss at Washington University in St. Louis and Dan Ariely at Duke University and uses Intuit's TurboTax tax preparation software.

== Background ==
The moment people are notified about their tax refund is a golden opportunity to divert money into short- and long-term savings. The participant just learned they will be receiving money, the money feels like a windfall (outside of their normal income pattern) and they do not yet have the money in hand.

The R2S initiative capitalizes on this opportunity. The R2S initiative is designed to help us better understand the exact mechanisms that would convince individuals to divert money to savings and debt clearing at this golden moment. For example, would mentioning the names of the taxpayer's children increases the desire to divert money? Or would providing taxpayers a sense of common behavior among their peers motivate increased debt clearing?

The R2S initiative is designed to help us better understand the exact mechanisms that would convince individuals to divert money to savings and debt clearing at this golden moment. The prompts are informed by behavioral economics principles and have been shown in prior research to significantly increase savings intention in lower-income taxpayers. The variation in the prompts tests the influence of particular motivations on financial decision-making, compared with an unprompted control group. The variation in defaults tests the effect of defaults and of anchoring on savings behavior.

== Research Agenda ==
The R2S initiative involves collecting three streams of data to evaluate the impact of the intervention and inform the design of future innovations to build savings, including the Intention Survey, In-Product Saving Offer, and Household Financial Survey.

=== Intention Survey ===
The Intention Survey is cross-sectional and designed to elicit information about possible behaviors and responses to behavioral economics-inspired prompts. It also gauges ownership of financial products (e.g., checking account, savings bond) and interest in using or opening these products at tax time. Findings from the Intention Survey contributed to the development of the In-Product Saving Offer and the Household Financial Survey. In 2012, 4,087 Intuit customers responded to the Intention Survey.

=== In-Product Saving Offer ===
The In-Product Saving Offer is the largest saving experiment ever undertaken in the U.S. TurboTax Freedom Edition users with refunds are assigned randomly to a treatment condition or control group. The control group uses the regular TurboTax program. The treatment group uses a version of the program in which they receive a prompt and a saving opportunity designed to increase saving. Data generated by program use and refund allocation behavior will be evaluated to determine whether the prompts, saving opportunity, or both increased saving levels compared to the control groups. In 2012, 150,000 people were included in the study, and about 1 million tax filers are expected to be included in 2013.

=== Household Financial Survey ===
The Household Financial Survey (HFS) is a longitudinal cohort study designed to determine the impact of tax-time saving and examine the effects of supply (e.g., availability of and access to savings products) and demand (e.g., awareness of the need for precautionary savings) factors that may influence the use and impact of the intervention. HFS participants will be sampled from those randomized in the In-Product Saving Offer and surveyed immediately after tax filing and again six months later. The HFS will allow R2S researchers to understand the impact of saving on the financial lives of households by (a) describing the context in which people choose to save at tax time, (b) determining if savings initiated by the In-Product Offer are new (i.e., not money that would have been saved in the absence of the intervention), and (c) verifying whether the savings ultimately increase households’ financial security. In 2012, the HFS pilot included about 350 households, and the research team expects about 12,000 households to participate in the study in 2013.

== Impact ==
Ultimately, R2S has numerous implications for ongoing policy discussions at state and federal levels. First, the findings will show whether (a) the use of behavioral economics-inspired interventions can increase saving at tax time and (b) saving-promotion efforts yield increased financial security and improved household balance sheets. Second, the project could provide evidence on the effect of supply- and demand-side constraints to saving and thus inform policy discussions regarding financial access, financial knowledge, and consumer protection. Third, the design and operation of the R2S initiative may be of interest to those considering policy innovations that leverage private-sector resources or incorporate public-private partnerships to achieve public policy objectives.

The team is also planning an ambitious program of dissemination to share R2S findings with a variety of audiences. Several policy, academic, and general interest publications will be produced detailing the impact of the experiment and findings from the research in each year. R2S also plans to host events to share interesting findings with the research and policy communities and with the general public.
