= Dead Man's Gun =

American television series

- Genre: Anthology / Western
- Created by: Ed Spielman; Howard Spielman
- Narrated by: Kris Kristofferson
- Composer: Terry Frewer
- Country of origin: Canada
- Original language: English
- No. of seasons: 2
- No. of episodes: 44

Production
- Executive producer: Henry Winkler
- Running time: 60 minutes

Original release
- Network: Showtime
- Release: March 2, 1997 – March 26, 1999

Dead Man's Gun was a Western anthology television series on Showtime from 1997 to 1999. The series followed the travels of a gun as it changed the lives of those who possessed it.

Every episode was narrated by Kris Kristofferson. The series was executive produced by Henry Winkler, who also guest starred in two episodes.

== Plot ==
Set in the Old West, this anthology follows the eponymous artifact, a handsome yet cursed gun that brings either disaster or fortune to whoever possesses it. In some cases of the former consequence, the gun's more villainous owners are killed at the end of the episode, while in others they live but suffer for their misdeeds.

In a similar fashion to The Twilight Zone and The Outer Limits, there are often twist endings to the stories. For example, in the episode, "The Collector", the main character discovers that his servant is actually the infamous criminal, El Lobo, who then scalps him. And the series finale, "A Just Reward", provides a twist ending to the series as a whole when it is ultimately revealed that the gun's original owner was the Grim Reaper.

== Cast ==
=== Main ===
- Kris Kristofferson as The Narrator

=== Guests ===
- John Ritter
- John Glover
- Laurie Holden
- Frank Whaley
- Henry Winkler
- Larry Drake
- William Katt
- Matt Frewer
- JoBeth Williams
- Kim Coates
- Gordon Clapp
- Grant Shaud
- Daphne Zuniga
- Graham Greene
- Adam Beach
- Terry Rothel

== Episodes ==
=== Season 1 (1997–1998) ===
Season 1 consisted of 22 Episodes.

- The first three episodes were aired as a single TV movie

No. overall	No. in season	Title	Directed by	Written by	Original release date	Viewers (millions)
1	1	"The Great McDonacle"	Ed Spielman & Howard Spielman	Joseph L. Scanlan	2 March 1997	3.46
A sideshow trickshooter (John Ritter) suddenly becomes a master marksman when he gains hold of the gun.
2	2	"Fool's Gold"	Ed Spielman & Howard Spielman	Brad Turner	2 March 1997	3.46
Jack Fleetwood (John Glover) salts a mine, and tries to convince an honest farmer (Matt Frewer) to buy this worthless mine. He intends to kill the half-wit and inherit the entire mine back, with the help of his beautiful new girlfriend (Laurie Holden), and run it with the equipment he plans to purchase using money he has gotten from the local loan-shark.
3	3	"My Brother's Keeper"	Ed Spielman & Howard Spielman	Neill Fearnley	2 March 1997	3.46
Cole (Frank Whaley) finds the gun and tragedy comes to his brother.

No. overall	No. in season	Title	Directed by	Written by	Original release date	Viewers (millions)
4	4	"The Imposter"	Ed Spielman & Howard Spielman	Sturla Gunnarsson	13 July 1997	2.51
A peddler (Henry Winkler in the first of two guest appearances) finds the gun on the corpse of a deceased marshal, and takes both it and the man's identity, becoming the marshal of a small town.
5	5	"Buryin' Sam"	Ed Spielman & Howard Spielman	William Gereghty	13 July 1997	2.64
A corrupt undertaker (Larry Drake) with a thing for killing widows gets his comeuppance when he becomes the gun's new owner.
6	6	"Highwayman"	Ed Spielman & Howard Spielman	Donald Shebib	16 July 1997	2.29
The owner of a failing boarding house (Grant Shaud) turns to a life of crime after taking a boarder's advice, then robbing him of his money and the gun.
7	7	"Bounty Hunter"	Ed Spielman & Howard Spielman	Brenton Spencer	30 July 1997	1.95
A shopkeeper (Gordon Clapp) plagued with ennui decides to take up bounty hunting, shortly before the gun finds its way to him.
8	8	"The Black Widow"	Ed Spielman & Howard Spielman	David Winning	13 August 1997	2.02
After inheriting the gun from her deceased husband, a "black widow" killer (Daphne Zuniga) plans to strike again...only to learn that her husband has a secret of his own.
9	9	"The Healer"	Ed Spielman & Howard Spielman	Neill Fearnley	20 August 1997	2.16
After delivering a baby, Dr. Butler (William Katt) is paid with the gun, that awakens painful memories.
10	10	"Medicine Man"	Ed Spielman & Howard Spielman	Brad Turner	10 September 1997	2.16
A young Indian (Adam Beach) finds the gun and tries to use it to avenge his father's (Graham Greene) death.
11	11	"Next of Kin"	Siobhan Byrne O'Connor	Joseph L. Scanlan	1 October 1997	1.79
An old man (Ed Asner) invites his nearest and dearest to share his last moments, and to decide who is worthy to inherit his riches.
12	12	"Death Warrant"	Ed Spielman & Howard Spielman, John Hunter	René Bonnière	15 October 1997	2.00
A ruthless bounty hunter (Michael Moriarty), who took the gun from a target, gets a taste of his own medicine when the mother (Kate Jackson) of a boy he accidentally killed puts a bounty on his head.
13	13	"The Fortune Teller"	Alison Wells	Gregg Baxter	22 October 1997	2.07
What does the future hold for a gypsy fortune teller (Elizabeth Peña) when the gun grants her crystal ball genuine visions of what's to come?
14	14	"Mail Order Bride"	Ed Spielman & Howard Spielman, Elizabeth Keyishian	Joseph L. Scanlan	22 October 1997	1.88
A blacksmith (Meat Loaf) sends away for a bride - unfortunately, his delivery includes the Dead Man's Gun.
15	15	"The Mesmerizer"	Ed Spielman & Howard Spielman	Alex Pappas	7 January 1998	1.72
After receiving the gun from a mysterious patient, a slimy hypnotist (Ted Shackelford) discovers his skills are dramatically enhanced.
16	16	"Stagecoach Marty"	Ed Spielman & Howard Spielman	Helen Shaver	14 January 1998	1.78
A stagecoach driver finds romance with a passenger whose large shipment of silver also interests him. JoBeth Williams and Kim Coates guest star.
17	17	"The Photographer"	Ed Spielman & Howard Spielman	Brad Turner	17 January 1998	2.11
Wanting to make a name for himself, a photographer (Gary Cole) begins following the gun and takes pictures of whatever disasters happen.
18	18	"The Resurrection of Joe Wheeler"	Ed Spielman & Howard Spielman	Charles Wilkinson	28 January 1998	2.18
A town drunk (Brian Kerwin) must return to his former life as a legendary gunslinger to save his town from a group of outlaws...with a little help from the Dead Man's Gun.
19	19	"The Gambler"	Ed Spielman & Howard Spielman, Bruce Zimmerman	Charles Wilkinson, Paul Etherington	4 February 1998	2.04
Luck finally smiles on a down-and-out gambler (Stephen Lang) when he becomes the gun's latest owner, and has a winning streak. The only catches are that his luck has a time limit...and is only activated when he uses the gun to kill.
20	20	"The Deserter"	Chris Dickie	Neill Fearnley	11 February 1998	1.85
The Dead Man's Gun continues changing hands, ending up in the possession of a deserter (Ricky Schroder) who soon finds the gun carries a responsibility he can not fulfill.
21	21	"Wages of Sin"	Ed Spielman & Howard Spielman, Bruce Zimmerman	Brenton Spencer	18 February 1998	1.89
A swindling holy man (Tim Matheson) believes the gun has given him genuine healing abilities.
22	22	"Snakefinger"	Ed Spielman & Howard Spielman	Larry Sugar	25 February 1998	2.24
The gun's newest owner, a safecracker aptly nicknamed "Snakefinger" (Matt Craven, may find redemption and love when he meets the daughter of his latest target.

=== Season 2 (1998–1999) ===
Season 2 consisted of 22 Episodes.

No. overall	No. in season	Title	Directed by	Written by	Original release date	Viewers (millions)
23	1	"The Judgement of Joe Dean Bonner"	Howard Friedlander	René Bonnière	7 August 1998	1.91
Ruthless criminal and current gun owner Joe Dean Bonner (Brian Austin Green) faces justice at last when he's put on trial... and the jury is made up of all of his victims.
24	2	"Ties That Bind"	Bruce Zimmerman	Sturla Gunnarsson	14 August 1998	2.04
A farmer (Bruce Davison) is arrested for a crime he didn't commit, and is put on a chain gang.
25	3	"Sheep's Clothing"	John Hunter, Ed Spielman, Howard Spielman	Ken Girotti	23 August 1998	1.83
A lamb becomes a lion when the gun falls into the hands of a meek school teacher (Garwin Sanford), who begins getting back at his tormentors.
26	4	"Winner Takes All"	Ed Spielman, Howard Spielman	William Gereghty	4 September 1998	1.83
A boxer and his wily manager try to swindle a small town chisler. Stuart Margolin guest stars.
27	5	"Sisters of Mercy"	Dennys McCoy, Pamela Hickey, Ed Spielman, Howard Spielman	Ken Jubenvill	11 September 1998	1.66
The gun is stolen by a pair of Irish con artist sisters posing as nuns (Susan Hogan and Kendall Cross), who soon become the unlikely heroes of a small town under the thrall of a corrupt banker.
28	6	"Hangman"	John Mandel, Ed Spielman, Howard Spielman	Brenton Spencer	18 September 1998	1.70
A hangman (Henry Winkler in his second and final appearance on the series), who becomes another owner of the gun, must rectify a mistake he made after he spares the life of a reverend accused of rape and murder.
29	7	"The Collector"	William T. Conway, Ed Spielman, Howard Spielman	James Head	25 September 1998	1.59
A tale of three collectors: a good man, a bad man, and a really bad man, all after a treasure map. And the second just happens to own the gun. Michael York guest stars.
30	8	"The Trapper"	Dennys McCoy, Pamela Hickey, Ed Spielman, Howard Spielman	Brenton Spencer	2 October 1998	1.82
A cruel trapper who owns the gun gets what's coming to him when Charlie Three Claws (Gordon Tootoosis), the grandfather of a young Native American woman he raped, resorts to the supernatural for payback.
31	9	"The Mimsers"	Howard Friedlander, Ed Spielman, Howard Spielman	Ken Jubenvill	9 October 1998	1.85
Fleeing from England, husband and wife criminals the Mimsers (Lysette Anthony and Chris Humphreys) wind up in the employ of an addle-brained Colonel (Bo Svenson). Unfortunately for them, their boss owns the Dead Man's Gun.
32	10	"The Pinkerton"	Samuel W. Gailey, Ayn Carrillo Gailey, Ed Spielman, Howard Spielman	Brenton Spencer	30 October 1998	1.62
A Pinkerton detective (Michael Dorn) is called in to investigate the kidnapping of a wealthy man's wife.
33	11	"Seven Deadly Sins"	Bruce Zimmerman, Ed Spielman, Howard Spielman	Bruce Zimmerman	6 November 1998	1.47
A prodigal son (Daniel Baldwin) wants to take over his father's bank.
34	12	"The Ripper"	Ed Spielman, Howard Spielman	Sturla Gunnarsson	27 November 1998	1.51
Has Jack the Ripper resurfaced in America? That's what a visiting inspector (Peter Firth) says when murders begin taking place in a small town that mirror the infamous serial killer's crimes.
35	13	"The Regulator"	Rogers Turrentine, Ed Spielman, Howard Spielman	Paul Etherington	22 January 1999	1.53
A killer for hire (Billy Campbell) meets a woman who wants to write his biography... and also comes across the gun.
36	14	"The Womanizer"	Guy Prevost, Ed Spielman, Howard Spielman	Kate Jackson	29 January 1999	1.28
A man (Patrick Duffy) who loves 'em and leaves 'em, gets his comeuppance.
37	15	"Sleepwalker"	Ed Spielman, Howard Spielman	TBA	5 February 1999	1.41
A cobbler (Alex McArthur), whom the gun was given to as payment, doesn't know if he committed a series of murders in his sleep.
38	16	"Four of a Kind"	Ed Spielman, Howard Spielman	Sturla Gunnarsson	12 February 1999	1.37
A woman (Joanna Pacula) takes revenge on some very bad dudes...with the aid of the Dead Man's Gun.
39	17	"The Oath"	Samuel W. Gailey, Ayn Carrillo Gailey, Ed Spielman, Howard Spielman	Michael John Bateman	19 February 1999	1.38
A female doctor (Cynthia Geary), who now owns the gun, must overcome the prejudice towards someone in her position to cure an epidemic.
40	18	"The Good Chef"	Ed Spielman, Howard Spielman	William Gereghty	18 September 1998	1.54
Emil (Jay Thomas) considers himself an artist entitled to certain privileges. When he discovers he is just a cook, he owes his enlightenment to a loving mother and the likes of the Dead Man's Gun.
41	19	"The Vine"	William T. Conway, Ed Spielman, Howard Spielman	TBA	26 February 1999	1.60
An Italian immigrant (Scott Bellis) on his way to California comes upon a nanny (Lalainia Lindbjerg) who lost her family to bandits.
42	20	"Bad Boys"	John Mandel, Ed Spielman, Howard Spielman	TBA	12 March 1999	1.38
Three troubled young men find the gun after its previous owner (Bruce Boxleitner) hides it, then use it to try to make their lives better.
43	21	"The Phrenologist"	Tom Nursall, Ed Spielman, Howard Spielman	TBA	19 March 1999	1.27
A chance encounter with a man immersed in quicksand gives a young boy possession of a horse, some stolen money and the Deadman's Gun. C. Thomas Howell guest stars.
44	22	"A Just Reward"	Ed Spielman, Howard Spielman	TBA	26 March 1999	1.41
In a clip show based series finale, a criminal (William Forsythe) is hired to retrieve the gun for the enigmatic Mr. Smith (Kavan Smith), killing the gun's latest owner in the process. But his employer seems to know quite a great deal about the gun... and some of its previous owners.

== Home media ==
On February 15, 2011, Alliance Home Entertainment released the complete first season of Dead Man's Gun on DVD in Canada only. Season 2 was released on March 15, 2011. On April 2, 2013, TGG Direct released both seasons on DVD in the US.
