= New York City Police Department Highway Patrol =

Highway Patrol in New York City

Highway Patrol
- Highway Patrol patch
- Active: 1911; 115 years ago
- Country: United States
- Agency: New York City Police Department
- Type: Specialized Unit
- Role: Patrolling all limited access highways within New York City.
- Operations jurisdiction: New York City
- Part of: Highway District of the NYPD Transportation Bureau
- Headquarters: Highway District
- Abbreviation: HWY

Structure
- Sworn Officers: Approx. 180 (2024)
- Auxiliary Police Officers: Approx. ~20
- Units: Highway Unit #1: The Bronx and Manhattan; Highway Unit #2: Brooklyn; Highway Unit #3: Queens; Highway Unit #5: Staten Island

Commanders
- Current commander: Inspector Conor Wynne
- Notable commanders: Inspector Nicole Papamichael, first female to be in command of the Highway District. Inspector Sylvester Ge, first Asian commanding officer.

Website
- Official website (Twitter)

The New York City Police Department Highway Patrol are specialized units part of the Highway District with the Transportation Bureau of the New York City Police Department. The Highway Patrol is primarily responsible for patrolling and maintaining traffic safety on limited-access highways within New York City. The Highway Patrol's other duties and roles include accident investigations, advanced driver and radar/laser speed enforcement training for NYPD officers, field sobriety testing at the various testing locations in each Patrol Borough, dignitary and parade escorts, hazardous material and truck traffic enforcement, anti-drag racing programs, and anti-terrorist checkpoints at key bridges and intersections in the city.

== History ==
The Highway Patrol's origins begin in 1911 with the formation of the NYPD's first motorcycle squad, which was formed to meet the challenges of handling increasing traffic danger concomitant with the rise of automobile use. The unit—then simply known as the Motorcycle Squad—was enlarged as automobile traffic and speeding arose as major problems for the city, and in 1929, the unit was expanded to include armored motorcycles for use in anti-gang activities by the NYPD.

In 1933, the unit expanded to include a formally designated "Grand Central Parkway Motorcycle Squad" for patrol on a limited-access highway.

Until 1972, the unit remained primarily focused on the Motorcycle Squad, when in that year the motorcycle division was merged with the Accident Investigation Squad to officially form the Highway Patrol. The Highway Patrol patch was created, however, five years later in 1977.

== Organization ==
The Highway District is divided into four sub-units:

- Highway Unit #1 in The Bronx (covers Manhattan and the Bronx)
- Highway Unit #2 in Brooklyn
- Highway Unit #3 in Queens
- Highway Unit #5 in Staten Island

Highway Unit #4 in Midtown Manhattan disbanded in September 2010

Highway Patrol also includes:

- Collision Technician Group (CTG)
- Collision Investigation Squad (each highway unit has a squad)
- Highway District Specialized Training School (HDSTS)
- Intoxicated Driver Testing Unit (IDTU)
- Drug Recognition Experts (DREs)
- Motor Carrier Safety Unit (MCSU)

== Uniforms ==
The former patch of the NYPD Highway Patrol.

In addition to the vehicular distinctions between the Highway Patrol and the general NYPD, there are differences in the uniforms as well. Aside from the Highway Patrol patch, Highway Patrol officers wear a uniform designed for both practical use and with traditional connections with motorcycle patrol duty in mind. In comparison with most NYPD officers' plain slacks or cargo pants, Highway Patrol members wear tapered motorcycle breeches with a 1-inch wide light blue braided stripe combined with a 1/2-inch wide reflective white stripe, as well as a "crushed"-style version of the NYPD's eight-point cap or a two-toned motorcycle helmet. Motorcycle or riding boots are worn whether an officer is assigned to motorcycle duty or not, excepting those assigned to Highway Patrol Motor Carrier Safety Unit details; Highway Patrol Motor Carrier Safety Unit officers wear regular black work boots or low quarters, cargo pants, jumpsuit, and nylon jacket. The Highway unit is also one of only two units within the NYPD allowed to wear leather jackets, as these jackets are better able to prevent injuries from motorcycle crashes. Additional unique uniform features are the unit's use of a Sam Browne belt and shoulder strap, braided leather sidearm lanyards, an “arrow shaped” collar bar clip and a specialized summons book pouch on their duty belt. In addition, instead of the standard regulation NYPD tie clip, many members wear a tie clip that has a miniaturized highway unit patch on it. The uniform and vehicle distinctions help give the Highway Patrol unit an elite look and prominent presence within the department.

The combination of the crushed cap, riding boots and the blue "distinction lace" on the Highway Patrol Uniform is in direct opposition to United States Army traditions; i.e., the uniforms worn by Highway Patrol are reminiscent of Cavalry, yet the blue is symbolic of Infantry. The color of the "distinction lace"—also known as "piping"—was switched from a black one inch band to the current blue piping under New York City Police Commissioner William Bratton's first term, who initiated the change in order to emulate the Boston Police Department's motor unit.

== Vehicles ==
The Highway Patrol vehicle fleet is primarily made up of all wheel drive Dodge Chargers equipped with Hemi engines and Ford Interceptor SUV’s. There are also Ford Taurus AWD Interceptors, in the vehicle fleet. The Motor Carrier Safety Unit utilizes Chevrolet Tahoe's and Traverses. They are not termed as "Police car cruisers" but rather as Radio Motor Patrol units(RMPs). Highway Patrol vehicles differ from more typical NYPD vehicles in that they feature a larger and more complex moveable light bar on the roof called "risers", which rise up into the air to promote greater visibility on highways and also to warn oncoming vehicles of the presence of danger or an obstruction. Highway Patrol RMPs are additionally equipped with Setina push bumpers to enable officers to push disabled vehicles off or out of a highway lane in order to smooth traffic flow. These vehicles also offer a much stronger engine compared to regular NYPD RMPs. A Highway Patrol RMP is also distinguished from other NYPD automobiles by its "HWY" designation on the rear of the car followed by its command unit number; additional Highway Patrol stenciling may also be present across the front and/or the rear windshield.

In addition to automobiles, the Highway Patrol continues to use motorcycles in its daily traffic duties; currently the Highway Patrol uses Harley-Davidson Road Kings, and these are most prominently used when escorting visiting national or foreign dignitaries to New York, or when opening many of the city's parades.

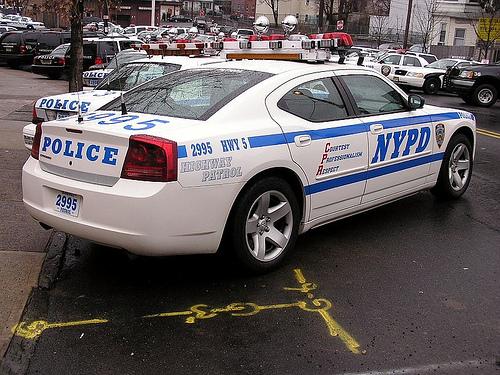
A Highway Patrol Dodge Charger radio motor patrol (RMP) car.

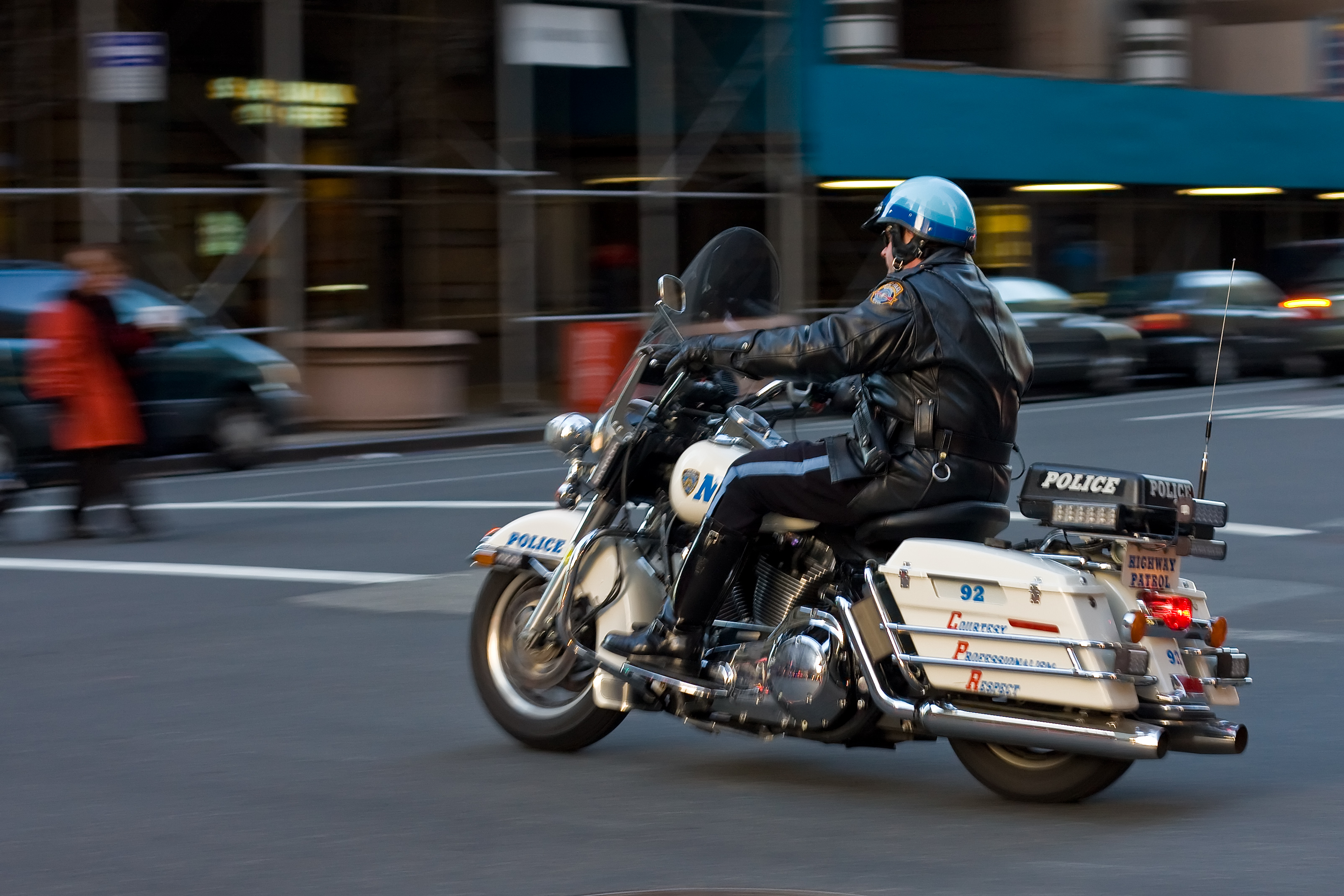
An NYPD Motor officer in action

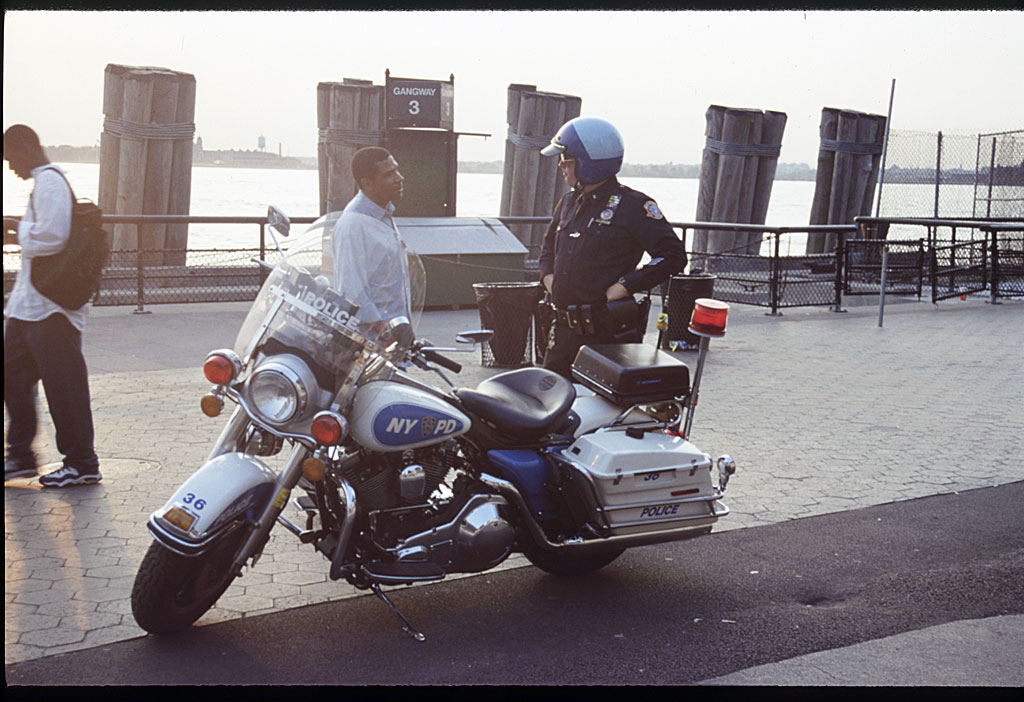
A Highway Patrol motorcycle.

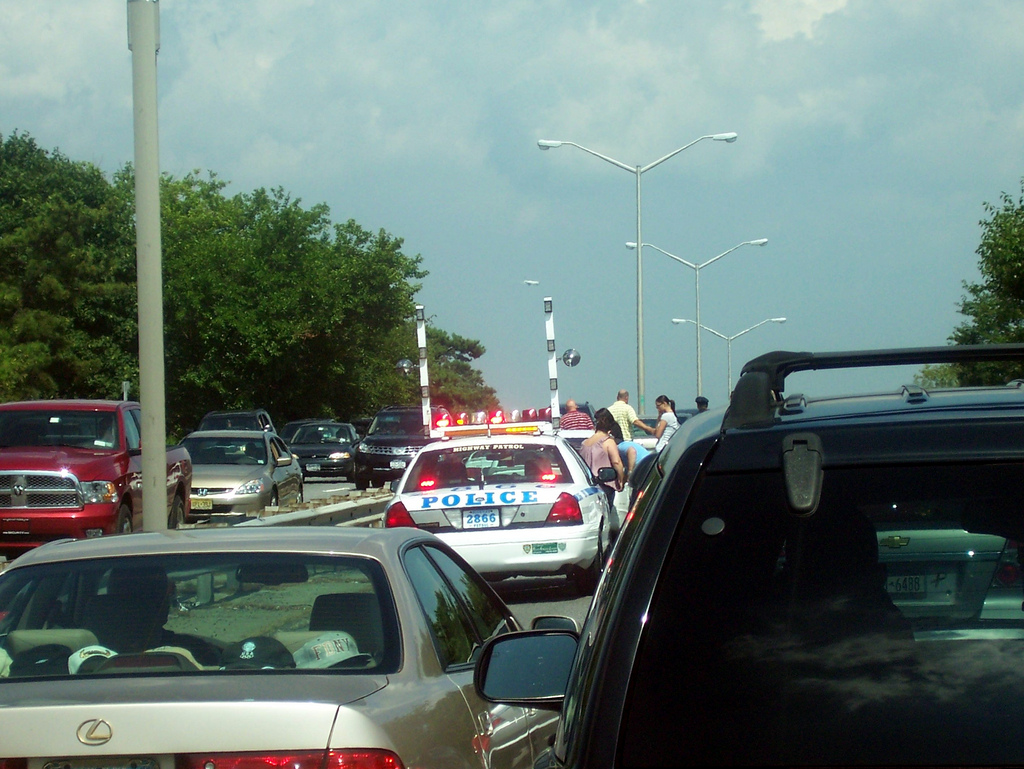
A Highway Patrol RMP with the riser lights up.

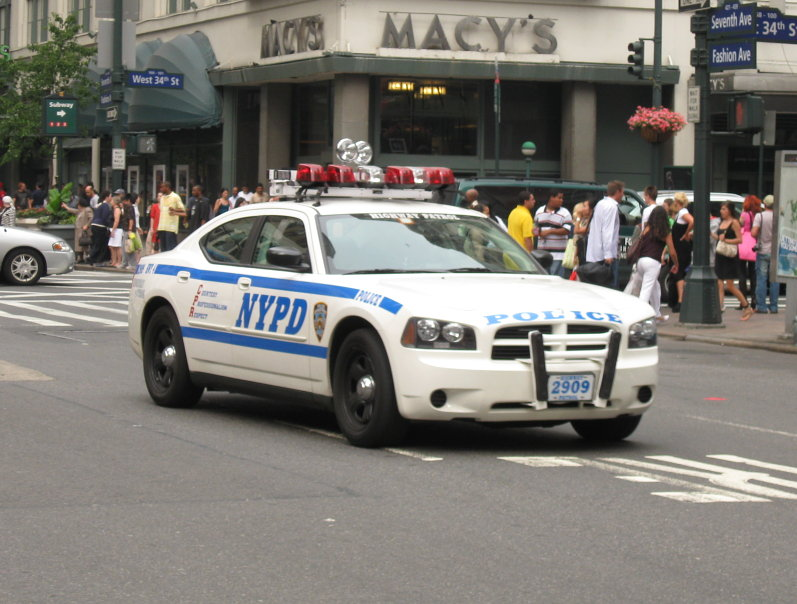
A Highway Patrol Dodge Charger RMP.

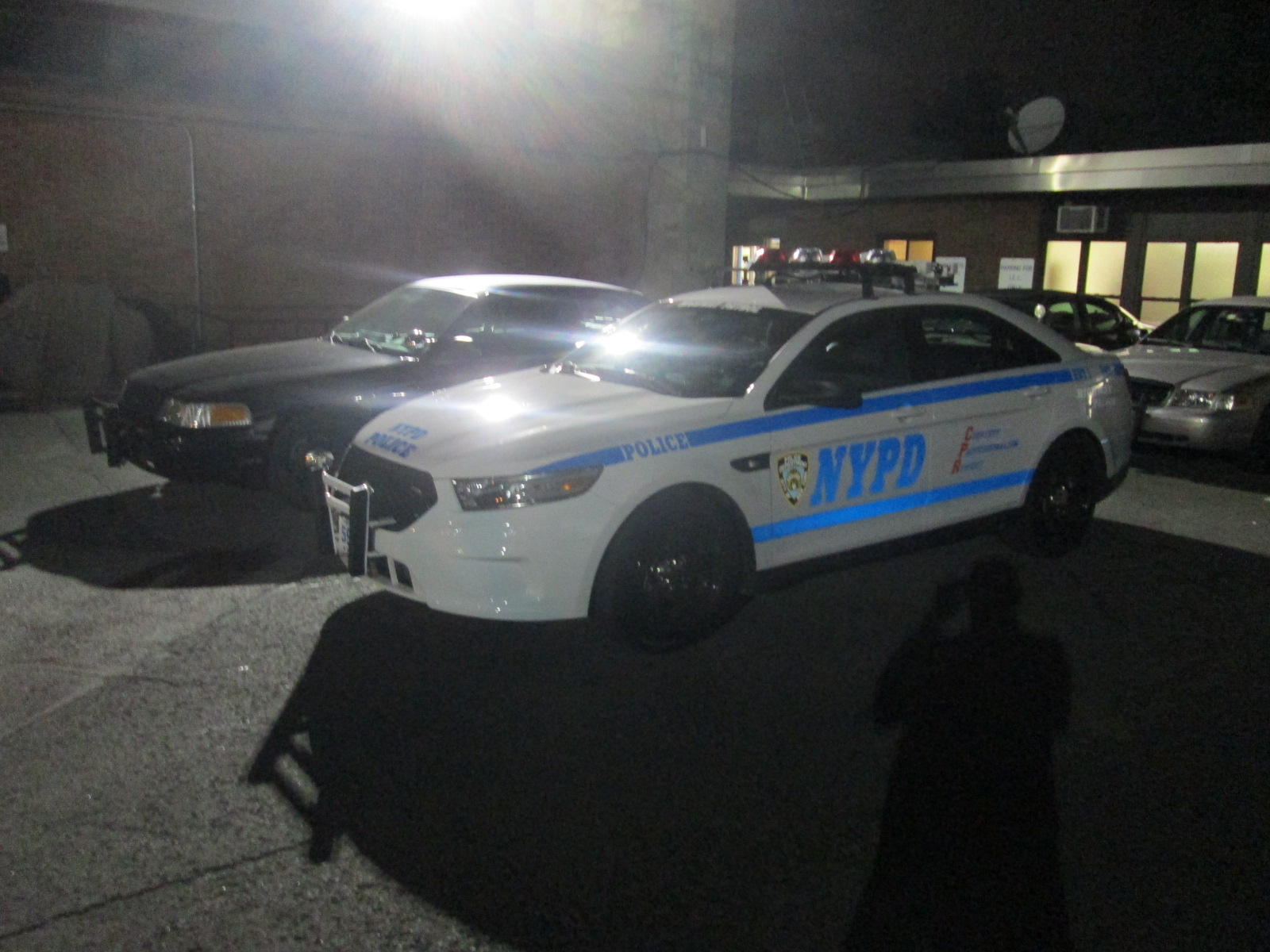
New Ford Taurus AWD Interceptor assigned to the Highway Patrol

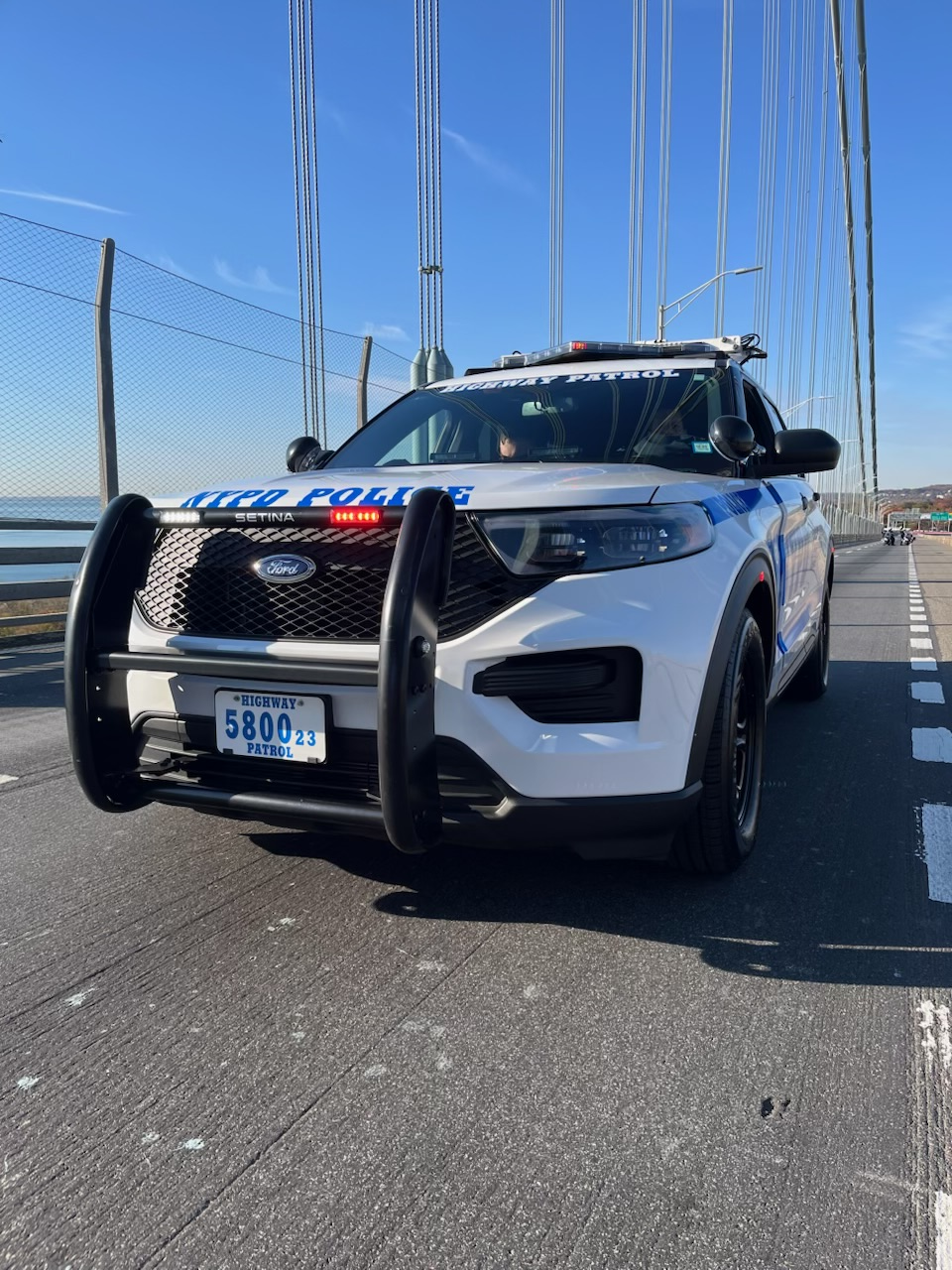
NYPD Highway Patrol RMP 580023

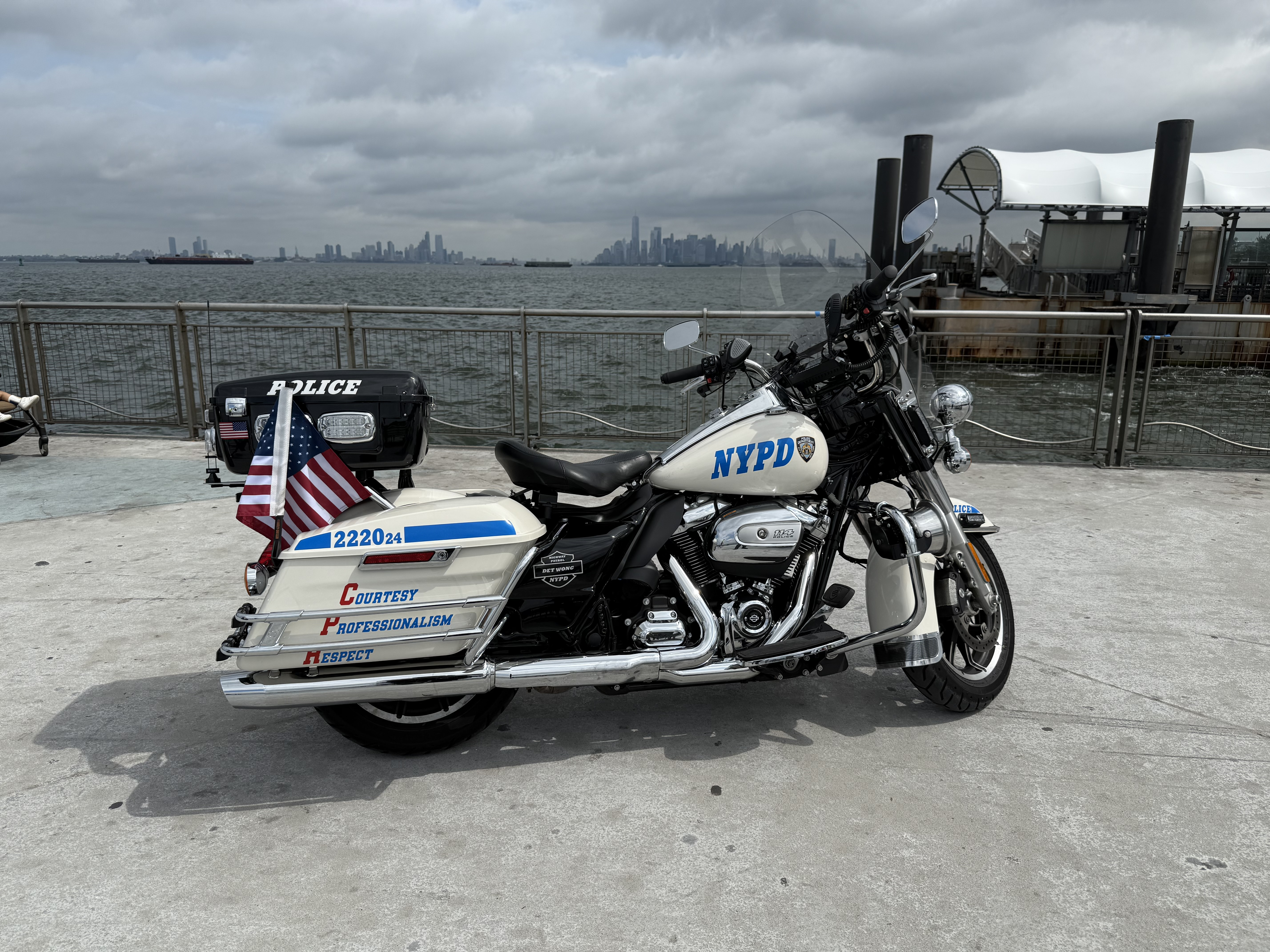
2024 Highway Patrol Motorcycle

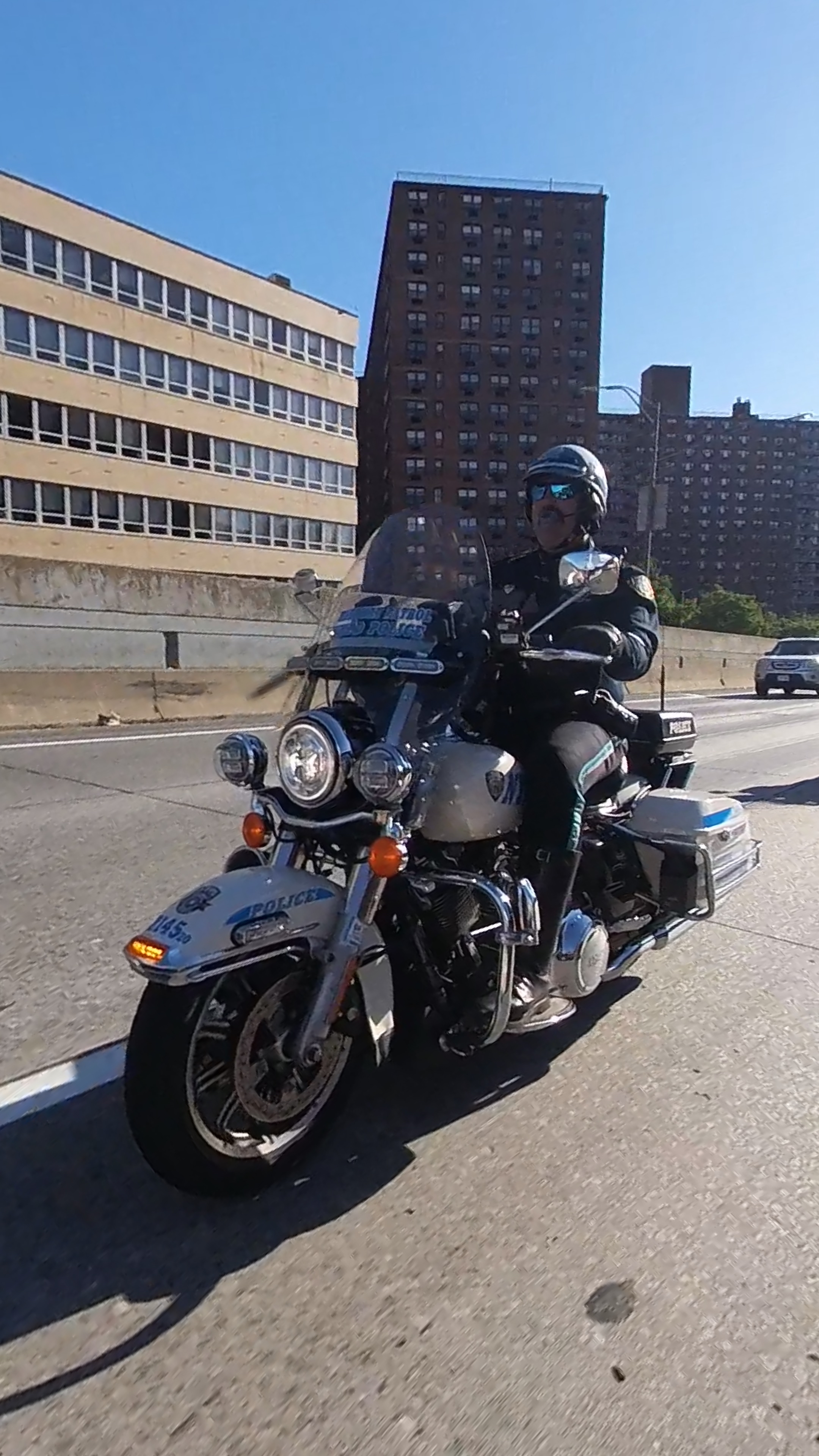
2020 Harley Davidson Road King

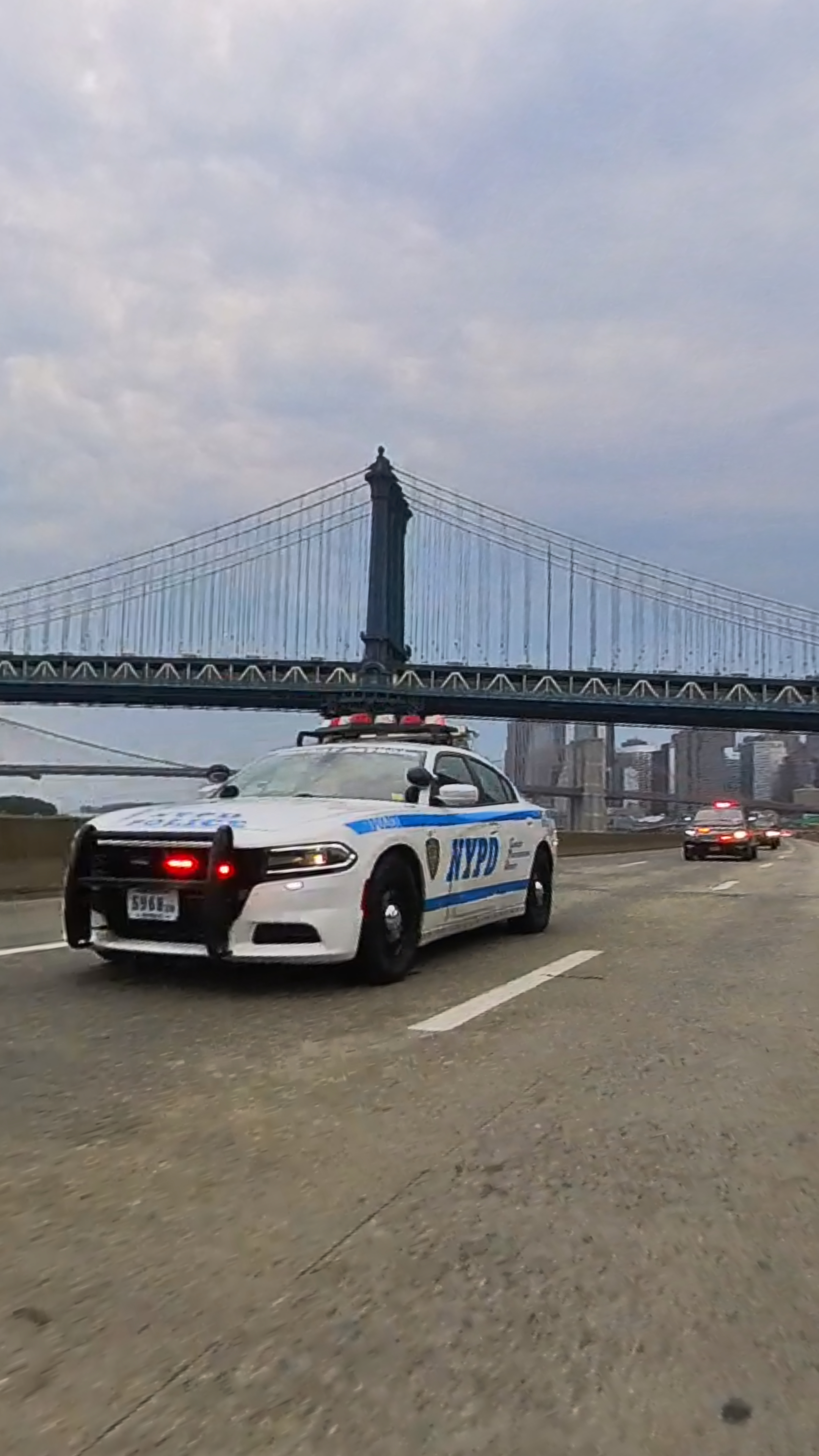
2020 Dodge Charger on the FDR Drive

== Auxiliary Police Highway Patrol Unit ==
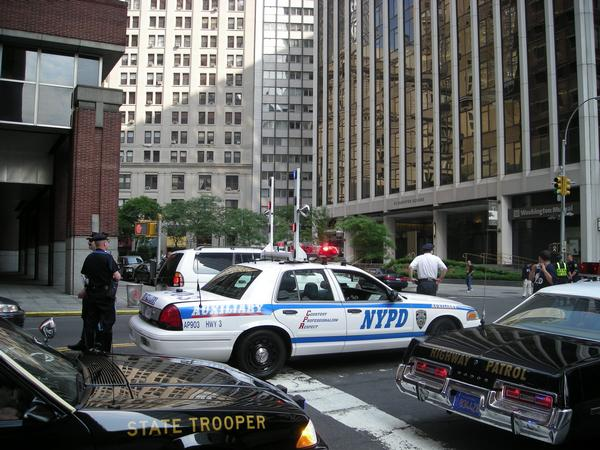
An NYPD Auxiliary Highway Patrol RMP.

The NYPD has a volunteer unit of the Highway Patrol Unit. This unit is called the New York City Police Department Auxiliary Police Highway Patrol Unit. The unit is made up of trained volunteer officers who assist the full-time Highway Patrol officers by patrolling the highways, parkways and main thoroughfares throughout the City of New York. The officers in this unit are equipped with handcuffs, a straight baton, whistle, flashlight, reflective traffic vest, and a police radio that is directly linked to the Central Dispatcher, other Auxiliary Police officers, and Highway Patrolman. These officers are unpaid, and receive no benefits for their work. The main jobs for these officers are to assist disabled vehicles and to aid in traffic control responsibilities at accident scenes. These officers do not carry a firearm, and they are never permitted to make traffic stops.

Auxiliary Highway Patrol officers wear the same uniforms as full-time Highway Patrol officers and patrol in marked Highway Patrol vehicles with AUXILIARY decals affixed to them. All applicants to this Auxiliary unit are required to have a minimum of five years experience as a patrol officer with the NYPD Auxiliary Police before they will be considered for the job. In addition they must be qualified to operate Highway Patrol vehicles (except motorcycles).

Auxiliary Police recruits must pass a 16-week "Auxiliary Police Basic Training Course" which is classified as "Part Time Peace Officer Training". Auxiliary recruits are required by the New York State Municipal Police Training Council to undergo and pass this training course before they become Auxiliary Police officers. The training given in this course includes training in penal law, radio use, unarmed self-defense including the use of pressure points, self-defense with a nightstick, first aid, firearm safety, domestic violence, and arrest procedures. A written and physical exam is given at the end of training.

All Auxiliary Police officers are required by New York State to pass an annual refresher course in the use of force with the nightstick, arrest procedures, and Equal Employment Opportunity (EEO).

Auxiliary Police officers are neither Police Officers nor Peace Officers (except during an emergency under 2.20 Criminal Procedure Law)

== Strength ==
At present, there are approximately 180 full-time uniformed members of the service and ~20 Auxiliary Police officers within the Highway Patrol, ranging from Auxiliary Police Officer to Auxiliary Inspector. As with the NYPD as a whole, the number of officers within the unit fluctuates according to budgetary and political changes. Full-time officers must volunteer, be selected to join the Highway Patrol Unit, and usually must have between five and ten years of commendable experience as a patrol officer in order to qualify for a position. Auxiliary Police officers must have five years of commendable experience as a patrol officer in the NYPD Auxiliary Police then may apply to transfer to the highway unit. In many ways, the elite status of this unit and its traditions are similar to that of the NYPD Mounted Unit.

== Similar units ==
The NYPD Highway Patrol occupies an unusual position as a municipality-based limited-access Highway Patrol and specialized task unit in the United States. Only a few other cities feature a similarly elite unit, most notably Philadelphia and its Philadelphia Highway Patrol and Boston and its Boston Police Special Operations Unit.

The nearby county of Nassau on Long Island also has a highway patrol unit within its County Police Department for patrol work on expressways in Nassau County. Suffolk County disbanded its highway patrol unit on September 15, 2008 and the highway patrol duties transferred to the Suffolk County Sheriff's Office. The police highway unit was recently reformed, however, and has resumed its former duties in Suffolk County.

== See also ==
- New York City Police Department
- New York City Police Department Auxiliary Police
- List of law enforcement agencies in New York
- Philadelphia Highway Patrol
- Boston Police Special Operations Unit
