= Robert Lyons =

Robert Lyons may refer to:

- Robert Fern Lyons (1856–1926), Manitoba politician
- Robert F. Lyons (actor) (born 1939), American actor
- Robert Llewellyn Lyons (born 1948), Saskatchewan politician
- Robert Dyer Lyons (1826–1886), Irish physician
- Robert Lyons (American football) (1934–2019), American football coach, Northeastern University
- Robert Lyons (writer) (born 1959), American playwright and director
- Robbie Lyons (1972–2003), American murderer
- Robert Lyons (Australian politician) (1849–1892), member of the Queensland Legislative Assembly
- Robert T. Lyons (1873–1956), American architect in New York City
- Robert Allan Gus Lyons (1890–1984), political figure in British Columbia
- Robert Lyons, sex offender caught on the TV show To Catch a Predator

== See also ==
- Robert Lyon (disambiguation)
