= New York City Police Department Auxiliary Police =

Auxiliary police in New York City

- Flag of New York City

- Shield of a New York City Police Department Auxiliary Police Officer

- Flag of the New York City Police Department
- Common name: NYPD Auxiliary
- Motto: Fidelis ad Mortem; Faithful to Death

Agency overview
- Formed: 1950

Jurisdictional structure
- Operations jurisdiction: New York, New York, U.S.
- Map of New York City Police Department Auxiliary Police's jurisdiction
- Area: 468.9 square miles (1,214.4 km^{2})
- Population: 8,274,527
- Legal jurisdiction: New York City

Operational structure
- Headquarters: Auxiliary Police Section; 120-55 Queens Boulevard; Kew Gardens, NY 11424
- Auxiliary Police Officers: 3,700+
- Agency executive: Captain Mohamadyah Patwekar, Commanding Officer
- Parent agency: New York City Police Department
- Units: List: Precinct Patrol; Transit Bureau; Housing Bureau; Highway Patrol; Harbor; Undercover Vice Ops
- Boroughs: List: Manhattan North; Manhattan South; Brooklyn North; Brooklyn South; Queens North; Queens South; Bronx; Staten Island

Facilities
- Commands: 78 Precincts 12 Transit Districts 9 Housing Police Service Areas
- Police car/vans: 120
- Police boats: 2

Website
- Official Site

The New York City Police Department Auxiliary Police is a volunteer reserve police force which is a subdivision of the Patrol Services Bureau of the New York City Police Department (NYPD). Auxiliary Police Officers assist the NYPD with uniformed patrols, providing traffic control, crowd control, and other services during major events.

Over 4,500 Auxiliary Police officers contribute over one million hours of service each year. The NYPD Auxiliary Police program is the largest Auxiliary Police program in the United States.

== Ranks ==
There are seven titles (referred to as ranks) in the New York City Police Department Auxiliary Police:

Title	Insignia	Shield	Uniform Shirt Color
Auxiliary Deputy Chief		Auxiliary Deputy Chief Shield	White
Auxiliary Inspector		Auxiliary Inspector Shield	White
Auxiliary Deputy Inspector		Auxiliary Deputy Inspector Shield	White
Auxiliary Captain		Auxiliary Captain Shield	White
Auxiliary Lieutenant		Auxiliary Lieutenant Shield	White
Auxiliary Sergeant		Auxiliary Sergeant Shield	Dark Blue
Auxiliary Police Officer		Auxiliary Police Officer Shield	Dark Blue

== History ==
The precursors to the Auxiliary Police were organized primarily during times of war when police officers were drafted into service, leaving the city with a diminished police force.

The Home Defense League was established in New York City in 1916 under Police Commissioner Arthur Woods to supplement the police force. Many police officers had joined the armed forces as the war in Europe progressed. Citizens volunteered to enroll in the Home Defense League to aid police in patrolling duties and be on hand in case of emergencies. In a matter of months, 22,000 people had volunteered for the Home Defense League. They were required to attend trainings on handling prisoners, protecting themselves, and using weapons. They received no pay. If the need arose (as it did in 1917 when armed forces were mobilized), they could be called into service to guard armories, subway stations, and other areas of the city.

In 1918, the Home Defense League changed its name to the New York Reserve Police Force, as proposed by Commissioner Richard Enright, in addition to undergoing higher-caliber training under Special Deputy Police Commissioner Lewis Rodman Wanamaker. Over 3,000 women joined the Police Reserve, serving under Captain Mary Noonan, primarily to provide eyes and ears for the police, look out for children's safety, and give first aid if necessary. Governor Alfred E. Smith signed a new state law in 1920 that established the permanency of a reserve force as an adjunct of the police department. By the mid-1920s, however, the Police Reserve had gradually stopped functioning as an active part of the Police Department, due to political disputes in a high-crime period. The Reserve was formally disbanded in 1934.

During World War II, the need for a reserve force briefly returned. The City Patrol Corps was organized in 1942 to assist police in patrol work; over 4,500 men and women volunteered. By war's end in 1945, the corps was disbanded, but the city continued to maintain a volunteer police unit.

In 1950, the 81st Congress of the United States of America passed the Public Law #920, entitled "The Civil Defense Act of 1950," authorizing a Federal Civil Defense Program. In 1951, the New York State Legislature enacted the "Defense Emergency Act" requiring New York City to recruit, train, and equip volunteer Civil Defense wardens, who would provide traffic and crowd control and other assistance to police officers in the event of an emergency or natural disaster.

The New York Penal Law provided peace officer status for the Civil Defense wardens during the event of an actual natural or man-made disaster or attack or during training drills. In 1967, a Mayoral Executive Order closed the Civil Defense Headquarters and placed full responsibility of the Civil Defense wardens with the NYPD. The NYPD retitled the division Auxiliary Police, changed the uniform to reflect police officer uniforms, and revised the duties of Auxiliary Police. During the 1960s when crime was on the rise, uniformed Auxiliary Police patrols were one means to deter crime.

Following the September 11 attacks in 2001, the role of the NYPD Auxiliary Police expanded significantly. Auxiliary officers were increasingly deployed at transportation hubs, public gatherings, and critical infrastructure sites to supplement visible police presence and assist with public safety operations during heightened counterterrorism efforts throughout New York City."Civilian History of the NYPD" (PDF). NYC.gov. New York City Police Department.

On March 14, 2007, around 9 p.m., a 42-year-old man named David Garvin, armed with two semi-automatic handguns and carrying 100 rounds of ammunition, entered De Marco's Pizzeria on Macdougal and West Houston Street. Garvin asked 33-year-old Alfredo Romero for a menu, and when he turned his back shot him 15 times. After killing Romero, Garvin fled the scene. Unarmed NYPD Auxiliary officers Yevgeniy Marshalik and Nicholas Pekearo begin chasing Garvin. Surveillance video shows when the chase reached Sullivan Street, Garvin fatally shot Pekearo as he ducked behind a vehicle. He then ran in the opposite direction and fatally shot Marshalik in the head. Garvin then ran into a nearby shop, then came out, pointing his gun at armed NYPD officers, and was fatally shot numerous times. Police later recovered a Taurus .357 Magnum revolver from Garvin's apartment. After the shooting, Margie De Marco, the owner of De Marco's Pizzeria, closed the pizzeria.

On March 20, 2020, the NYPD suspended the Auxiliary Police unit due to concerns regarding the COVID-19 pandemic.

== Training and authority ==
Auxiliary Police recruits must pass an 18-week, 140 hour "Auxiliary Police Basic Training Course".

Auxiliary recruits are required by the New York State Municipal Police Training Council to undergo and pass this training course before they become Auxiliary Police officers. The training given in this course includes training in penal law, police science, discipline, radio use, defensive tactics, unarmed self-defense, self-defense with a straight wood baton, physical training, chemical training, first aid, handcuffing techniques, and arrest procedures.

In 2008, the NYPD was mandated by the state to increase the hours of training and the training was revised to include training in location and use of pressure points, dealing with domestic violence situations, firearm safety, and terrorism awareness. A written and physical exam is given at the end of training.

Upon the completion of the Basic Training Course, the physical exam, and the written exam, probationary Auxiliary Police officers receive a peace officer training certificate from the NYS Municipal Police Training Council (MPTC) and are issued their shield and police identification card along with their baton and initial uniform allowance voucher.

Probationary Auxiliary Police officers must patrol with a field training officer.

All Auxiliary Police officers are listed in the NYS registry of peace officers and are required by New York State to pass an annual refresher course in the use of force with the straight baton, arrest procedures, and law in order to maintain their status as Auxiliary Police Officers and to maintain their NYS MPTC peace officer training certificate.

Auxiliary Police officers are considered limited function Peace Officers by the NYS MPTC when granted the authority by the police commissioner under §2.20 of the New York Criminal Procedure Law.

Auxiliary police officers are permitted to effect arrests in limited circumstances and are permitted by law to carry the tools to aid them in making arrests (handcuffs). NYPD Auxiliary Police officers are included in the "fellow officer rule" which allows an officer to rely upon information supplied by fellow officers when making an arrest. The Court of Appeals’ decision in The People of the State of New York vs Wilfredo Rosario in October 1991 affirmed that the "fellow officer" rule applies to NYPD auxiliary police officers. (Reference source: Court of Appeals decision in The People of New York State vs Wilfredo Rosario) October 1991)

Although volunteers, Auxiliary Police officers are city employees while on duty and are eligible for Workers' Compensation in the event of injury while on duty.

Auxiliary Police officers must purchase and maintain equipment at their own expense. Officers who work the minimum required hours per fiscal year receive an annual uniform allowance check to help pay for new and replacement equipment and uniforms.

== Laws ==
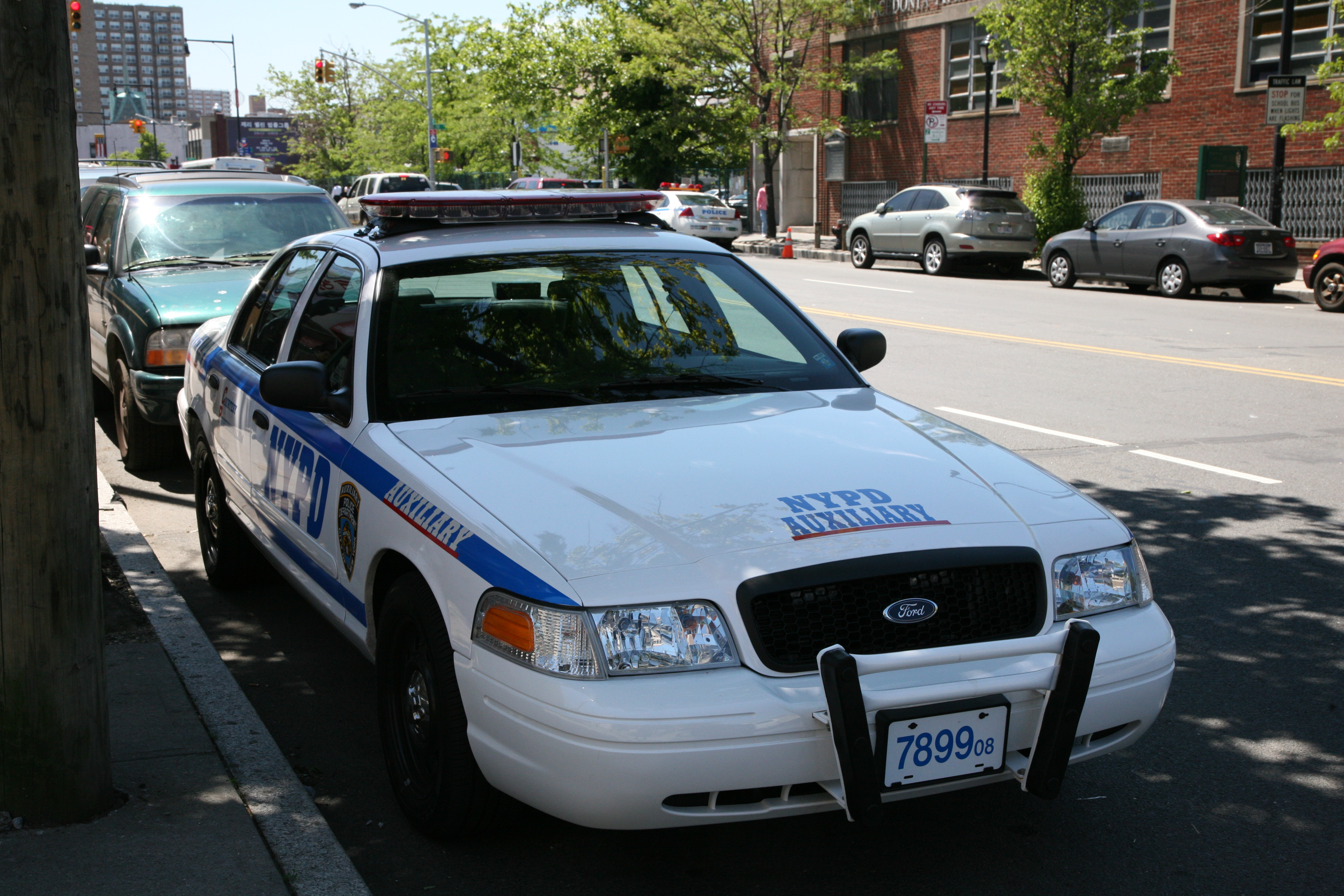
NYPD Auxiliary police car in 2008

- Auxiliary Police officers may carry and use straight wood batons
- Auxiliary Police officers may carry and use handcuff (optional) restraints both on and off duty in accordance with NYC Administrative Code 10–147
- Auxiliary Police officers may physically detain violators of Misdemeanors and Felonies under the State of New York Civil Defense Act Article # 8 Section # 105
- Auxiliary Police officers injured while on duty are provided Workers Compensation under NYC Administrative Code Section 14-147 of chapter 1 of title 14
- Auxiliary Police officers receive an annual uniform allowance in accordance with the NYC Administrative Code Section 14–148
- Auxiliary Police officers can use physical and deadly force to make an arrest, or when a person uses physical or deadly force against an officer or a third person in accordance with the NYPD Auxiliary training manual.
- NYPD Auxiliary Police officers are included in the "fellow officer rule" which allows an officer to rely upon information supplied by fellow officers when making an arrest. The Court of Appeals’ decision in The People of the State of New York vs Wilfredo Rosario in October 1991 affirmed that the "fellow officer" rule applies to NYPD auxiliary police officers. (Reference source: Court of Appeals decision in The People of New York State vs Wilfredo Rosario) October 1991)

== Duties ==
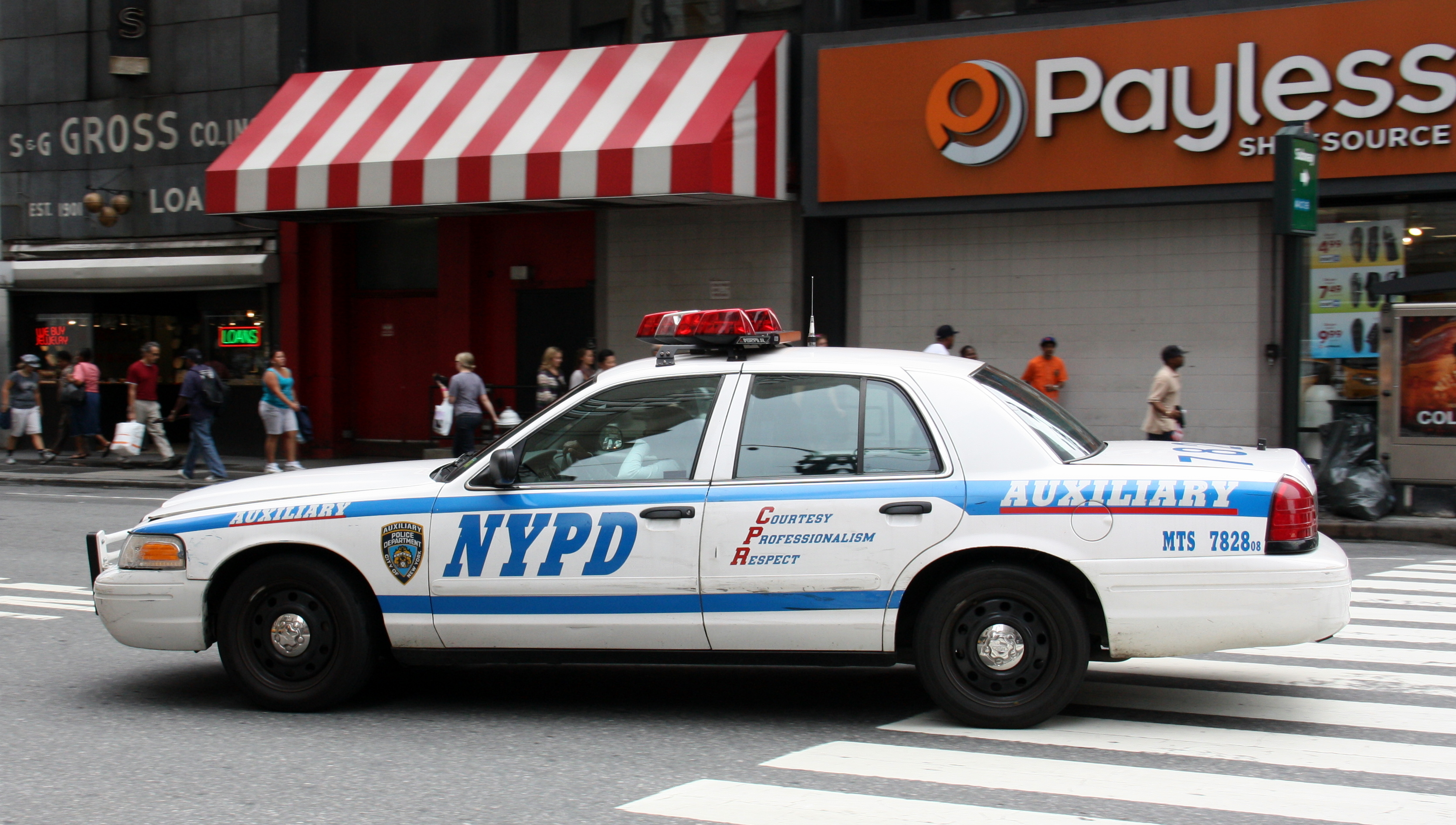
NYPD Auxiliary Crown Victoria Police Interceptor

Auxiliary Police officers duties fall into four broad categories:

1. Daily patrol of assigned sectors within their respective precinct, transit district, housing area or specialized unit coverage area.
2. Provide additional uniform police presence at parks, playgrounds, pools, street fairs, flea markets, block parties, shopping areas, subway entrances and exits, and school/church crossings.
3. Assist with vehicular and pedestrian traffic at parades, marathons, concerts, intersections with broken traffic lights, accident scenes, and fire scenes.
4. Assist in Precinct Identification Programs, Combat Auto Theft Program, Bicycle ID Program, Operation ID Program, Kid Care Program, and VIN Etching Program.

Auxiliary Police officers increase the public's perception of police "omnipresence" by patrolling in police cars and on foot. The police cars, known in the NYPD as Radio Motor Patrols (or simply "RMPs"), are white with blue decals, the same as regular NYPD police cars. The word "AUXILIARY" is placed on the trunk, hood, and front and rear side panels of the vehicles with a red underline.

Auxiliary Police Officers are equipped with straight wood batons when assigned to normal patrol, ASP batons (when assigned to bicycle patrol), bullet resistant vests, police radios directly linked to the Central Dispatcher, flashlights; whistles, handcuffs, notebooks, and reflective traffic vests.

With the exception of their badges, which are seven-point stars, in contrast to the shield worn by regular Police Officers, Auxiliary Police officers wear virtually the same uniform as regular officers. Additionally, Auxiliary Police Officers wear the regular NYPD patch on both shoulders with a scroll saying "AUXILIARY" on top.

Auxiliary Police officers in New York City are not permitted to carry a sidearm at any time on duty, even if independently licensed to carry a firearm. In other jurisdictions within New York State, some police departments do allow their Auxiliary Police Officers to carry a firearm.

Auxiliary Police Officers provide patrol presence, observations and reporting of incidents requiring regular police response. Auxiliary Police Officers may be involved in life or death situations like a full police officer but do not have the option of the use of a firearm.

== Role of the Auxiliary Police officer ==
Auxiliary Police officers can:

- Perform crowd control.
- Perform traffic control and effect street closures at parades, accidents, fires, etc.
- Perform traffic control at broken traffic lights, accidents, etc.
- Make arrests for crimes committed in their presence or communicated over a police radio.
- Give medical aid to anyone as long as they are trained to do so.
- Carry a police baton and ASP batons in the performance of their duties (NYS Penal Law 265.20 b.).
- Carry and use handcuff restraints in the performance of their duties (NYC Administrative Code 10–147).
- Make arrests for crimes not committed in their presence but only if ordered to do so by a regular police officer or a police dispatcher. In 1991, the New York State Court of Appeals determined that Auxiliary Police officers are covered under the "fellow officer rule", and therefore may detain a person based on information from a dispatcher or police officer heard over a police radio or from a police officer in person, and therefore are considered as a law enforcement officer with reliable information when making a report themselves to other law officers.

Auxiliary Police officers cannot:

- Respond to any 911 calls involving any type of weapons or other life endangering situation.

== Standard Auxiliary Police units ==
Precinct Patrol: Officers patrol their respective precinct. When performing foot patrol, the area of the precinct that the officer patrols is called a Patrol Area, which are divided into "Foot Posts". RMP and bike patrol are also performed. Officers under age 18 cannot perform patrol.

Housing Bureau: Officers patrol their respective Housing (Police Service Area) precinct, mainly being a uniformed presence within the NYC housing projects. When performing foot patrol, the area of the precinct that the officer patrols is called Patrol Areas, which are divided into "Foot Posts". RMP and bike patrol are also performed.

Transit Bureau: Officers patrol their respective Transit District precinct. When performing foot patrol, the area of the precinct that the officer patrols is called a Patrol Area, which are divided into "Foot Posts". RMP patrol is also performed.

=== Transit Auxiliary Police Officers ===
Two weeks after the 2005 London bombings, a new directive stated that New York City would institute a citywide transit Auxiliary program with the intent of reducing crime and fighting terrorism in the city's transit system. Transit Auxiliary officers work out of Transit Bureau precincts known as Districts and carry Transit portable radios. Unlike a precinct, the transit districts cover miles of underground subway. Transit Auxiliary Police officers go through additional training by the Transit Bureau Vandals Squad as well as the Counter-Terrorism Division to build vandalism and terrorism awareness within the Transit System. Transit Auxiliary officers are paired with either a regular police officer or Auxiliary police officer. Transit Auxiliary Police periodically perform inspections of the subway station(s) and platforms which they are assigned to, taking note of any suspicious occurrences, and set up a fixed post at the subway turnstiles, token booths, mezzanines, or platforms. Transit Auxiliary officers also conduct subway train inspections as well as train runs to/from stations that which assignment is given. Due to the common medical emergency calls in Transit, if medically qualified, Transit Auxiliary Police officers can respond to medical emergencies if they are near to the transit location. The main function of the NYPD Transit Auxiliary Police, like the NYPD Transit Police, is to primarily remain within the subway system.

== Specialized Auxiliary Police units ==
Highway Patrol: Officers patrol highways, parkways, and main thoroughfares throughout the City of New York. Auxiliary Highway Patrol officers wear the same uniform as regular Highway Patrol officers and patrol in regular officers RMPs in Auxiliary Police Highway Patrol RMPs with AUXILIARY decals on each side. All applicants to this unit are required to have a minimum of five years experience as a patrol officer with the NYPD Auxiliary Police, must be mature, and have exceptional discipline and service records. Officers will be required to attend an Advanced Vehicle Operation Course before they may operate a Highway Patrol Vehicle. Auxiliary Officers aren't allowed to perform Traffic Stops. See article: New York City Police Department Highway Patrol

Harbor Unit: Officers patrol New York City's waterways. A marine background such as one obtained through the U.S. Coast Guard, military, or other marine background is required.

Auxiliary Response Team: Established in 2024, officers in this unit are tasked with responding to rapid deployments such as creating presence in areas seeing a rise in crime. This unit only operates in Patrol Borough Manhattan North.

Citywide Traffic Task Force (CTTF): Officers patrol in areas all over the city that need special attention and extra patrol. However, more typical of this unit is performing duty during special events such as concerts, marathons, parades, etc. to increase the police presence. They are involved in both vehicular and pedestrian traffic control. They do not confine themselves to one location or precinct.

Undercover Vice Ops: Officers that have not reached the age of 21 years old (18-20 1/2) can be utilized to assist the NYPD Vice Unit Narcotics Division for "Quality of Life enforcement" stings which address illegal alcohol, knife, and spray paint sales. Other than this exception, NYPD Auxiliary Police officers are never undercover (*unless authorized by the Police Commissioner or Commanding Officer of the Auxiliary Police) and always patrol in uniform. Officers who have received the necessary "Vice Training" may be used by their command in surveillance operations.

Ceremonial Unit: The Auxiliary Police also has a ceremonial unit made up of a small group of Auxiliary officers.

[Disbanded] Patrol Support Unit: Also known as Auxiliary Rescue, officers would respond to incidents such as vehicle accidents and entrapments. This unit only existed in a few precincts, specifically the 122nd, 94th, and 61st precincts. The vehicles used were typically a 1990s older model GMC Stepvan or Ford F350 Van, similar to the ESU REP truck. This unit was disbanded in 2008 as a result of the city deeming it unnecessary.

== Auxiliary Patrol and police vehicles ==
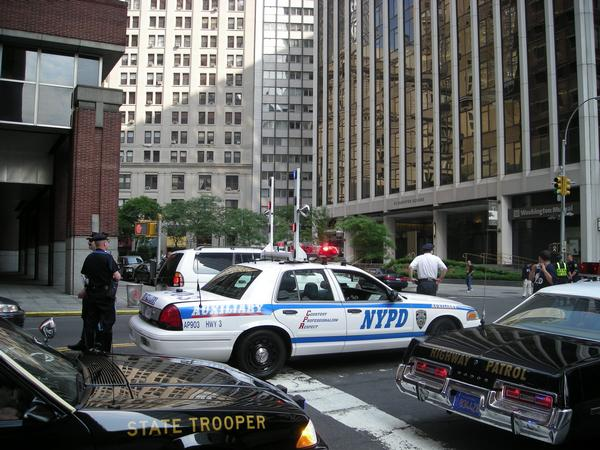
A New York City Police Department Highway Patrol Auxiliary police car in 2008

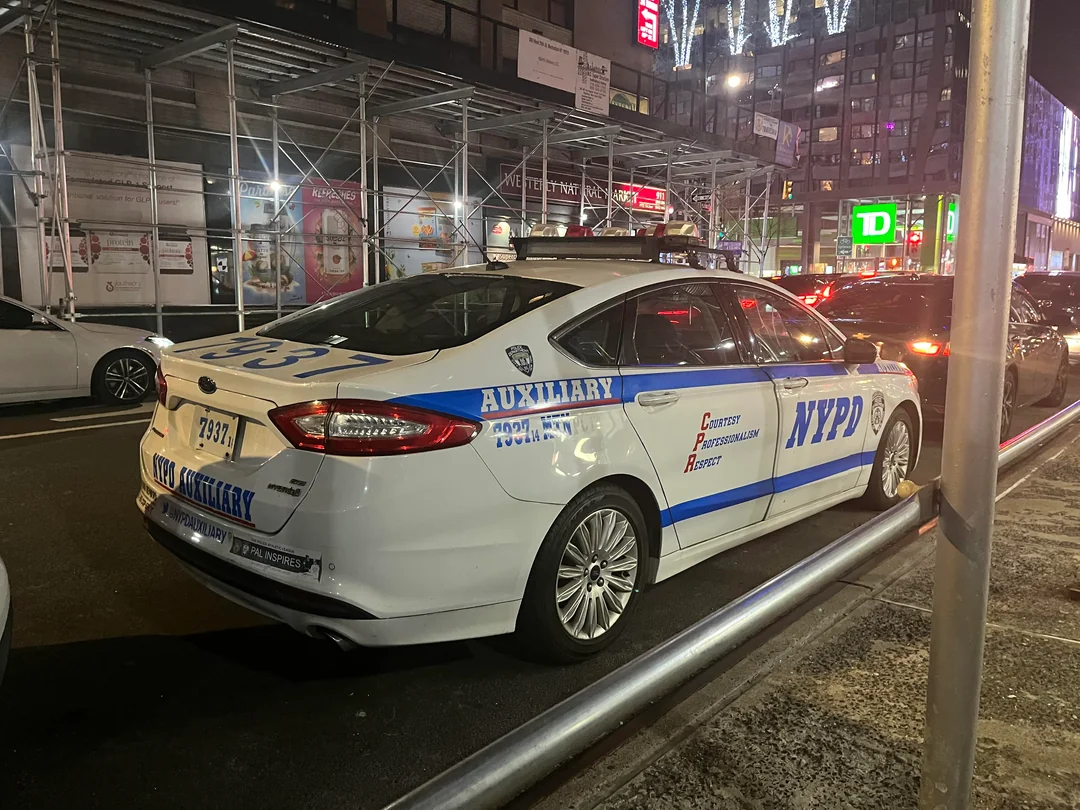
NYPD Auxiliary Ford Fusion In November 2025

Patrol is one of the most important duties Auxiliary officers can perform. Various types of patrols are possible within different precincts. Almost all precincts perform foot patrol. Other types of patrol include:

- RMP (Auxiliary Police Car) - cars are painted white with light blue decals.
- Van (15 passenger; Used for routine patrol and officer transport) - vans are painted white with light blue decals.
- Bicycle
- Police Golf Cart (only used in Manhattan's Central Park Precinct)

In most cases, Auxiliary Police vehicles are retired vehicles that were once used by regular officers. Once the vehicle attains a certain amount of mileage, it is taken out of service and is either redecaled and given to a command for the Auxiliary Police, or is sold. Auxiliary Highway Patrol RMPs are retired RMPs previously used by regular Highway Patrol officers. Most commands only have one Auxiliary vehicle, but some have two or more. The number of auxiliary vehicles per command is based on how many auxiliary officers are working there and how many extra vehicles the NYPD has available.

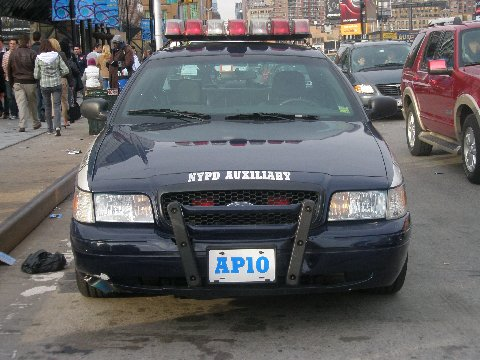
NYPD Auxiliary Police Interceptor, in the old black livery, discontinued in 2008

Officers wishing to operate a bicycle, police car, or van, need special training before they are allowed to operate them. Training is conducted by the Police Academy Driver Training Unit (PADT) which is located at Floyd Bennett Field in Brooklyn. The golf cart, which is special to the Central Park Precinct, also requires special training to operate.

=== Markings ===
In 2008, the NYPD changed the paint and decal color of Auxiliary vehicles to white with light blue decals in order to resemble vehicles used by regular officers to assist with “omni-presence” and a cost-saving measure to save money by not having to repaint the vehicles.

== Equipment ==
Auxiliary Police officers are not issued and are not permitted to carry firearms while on duty, even if otherwise authorized/licensed to carry when off-duty.

Seven auxiliary officers have been killed in the line of duty. On March 14, 2007, two Auxiliary Police officers—Eugene Marshalik and Nicholas Pekearo—were killed in a shootout in Greenwich Village.

Up until March 26, 2007, the NYPD did not issue or subsidize ballistic vests to Auxiliary officers. But after the shootings of Pekearo and Marshalik, Mayor Michael R. Bloomberg and Commissioner Raymond W. Kelly asked the New York City Council to earmark more than $3.3 million to provide all Auxiliary Police officers with Level IIIA Vests, the same used by full-time officers. On March 27, 2007, the City Council approved this bill, which had all Auxiliary officers equipped with vests. Since then, in 2010, funding for vest for Auxiliary Police Officers has run out of the NYPD City Budget. Every Police Precinct, Housing Police Service Area and Transit District has a pool of "loaner" vest for new Auxiliary Police Officers to use while on patrol. Afterwards, they are returned and secured by the Auxiliary Coordinator.

== Representation ==
Since 1964, the Auxiliary Police Benevolent Association of the City of New York, Inc. (APBA,) has been the union representing NYC Auxiliary Police Officers of all ranks. Although part-time volunteers, NYC APOs face many issues similar to those faced by paid employees, including health and safety conditions and NYPD disciplinary procedures, and the need for their interests to be represented to city, state and federal government, and other entities beyond the NYPD.

While they receive no compensation for their time on duty, qualifying APOs do receive an annual uniform allowance, which was originally won by the APBA. Membership in the union is voluntary.

== Line-of-duty deaths ==
Since the establishment of the New York City Police Department Auxiliary Police, seven officers have died in the line of duty.

Officer's name	End of watch	Cause of death
Auxiliary Sergeant David Freed	Sunday, August 31, 1975	Assault
Auxiliary Sergeant Noel R. T. Faide	Sunday, January 29, 1989	Vehicular Assault
Auxiliary Sergeant Larry L. Cohen	Sunday, January 29, 1989	Vehicular Assault
Auxiliary Police Officer Armando Rosario	Wednesday, March 25, 1992	Gunfire
Auxiliary Police Officer Milton S. Clarke	Wednesday, December 1, 1993	Gunfire
Auxiliary Police Officer Nicholas T. Pekearo	Wednesday, March 14, 2007	Gunfire
Auxiliary Police Officer Yevgeniy (Eugene) Marshalik	Wednesday, March 14, 2007	Gunfire

== Controversy ==
- There was a major controversy over benefits afforded to Auxiliary Police Officers. Under New York law, Auxiliary Police are trained "peace officers", receive a NYS MPTC peace officer training certificate and are listed in the state registry of peace officer, but do not have on or off-duty status except when authorized by the police commissioner. In 2008, the federal government denied death benefits for the families of Auxiliary Police Officers Eugene Marshalik and Nicholas Pekearo, who were killed in the line of duty, due to their lack of peace officer status when they were killed. After an appeal, the federal government reversed their decision and approved their death benefits.
- In January 2018, a former NYPD Auxiliary Police Officer began a lawsuit against the department and the Auxiliary Police Section in particular, for not adequately nor professionally processing her allegations of sexual harassment on two of her supervisors out of the Queens police precinct she worked out of. Her allegations, written into a formal complaint to the Division of Human Rights, said that on the night of August 22, 2017, her Coordinator (Police Officer Andrew Thaler) and one of her Auxiliary Police Supervisors (A/Sergeant Rohnit Singh) texted her following her regular tour of duty that night. They allegedly proceeded to insist, against departmental policy, to ask her to get off of her local bus early and meet them a block back in the direction of their station house. Upon arrival, the former APO claimed that she was molested by Officer Thaler and that her patrol supervisor, Auxiliary Sergeant Singh, stood by in the front of the NYPD vehicle they were in. After noticing that she wasn't interested, Officer Thaler had her dropped back off at the bus stop and returned to their assigned duties. Following a formal complaint to the NYPD regarding the incident, she was removed from the Auxiliary Police and given the reason that she broke departmental policy by entering the vehicle, knowing fully that it was in violation of said policies. As of April 2018, she is still fighting the department and the Auxiliary Police Section.

== Awards and decorations ==
=== Medal of Honor ===

(Solid green bar speckled tiny gold stars) is awarded for:

- Individual acts of extraordinary bravery intelligently performed in the line of duty at imminent and personal danger to life. Specifically, the Department Medal of Honor is awarded for acts of gallantry and valor performed with knowledge of the risk involved, above and beyond the call of duty. The Medal of Honor is intended only for regular Police Officers. It was awarded posthumously to Marshalik and Peakaro due to the extraordinary circumstances of their line of duty deaths. The Award of Valor is normally the highest decoration for bravery given to Auxiliary Police Officers.

=== American Flag Breast Bar ===

- May be worn by all Auxiliary Police Officers in the Auxiliary Unit

=== World Trade Center Breast Bar ===

- May be worn by all members who were in the Auxiliary Police on 9/11/2001.

=== Award of Valor ===

- May be worn by all members who have received the Award of Valor.

=== Award of Commendation ===

- May be worn by all Auxiliary officers who have received the Award of Commendation.

=== Award of Merit ===

- May be worn by all members who have received the Award of Merit.

=== Unit Citation ===

- May be worn by all members of the unit in the year citation was earned.

=== Community Service Award (3000 Hours) ===

- May be worn by all members who have 3000 hours of service in the Auxiliary Police.

=== 500 Hours Award ===

- May be worn by all members who have 500 hours of service in the Auxiliary Police.

=== Auxiliary Police 50th Anniversary ===

- May be worn by all members who were in the Auxiliary Police in 2000.

== See also ==
- New York City Police Department
- New York City Police Department Highway Patrol
- List of law enforcement agencies in New York
- Law enforcement in New York City
- New York City Police Department Cadet Corps
- Color of the day (police)
