= Ed Spielman =

American writer and producer

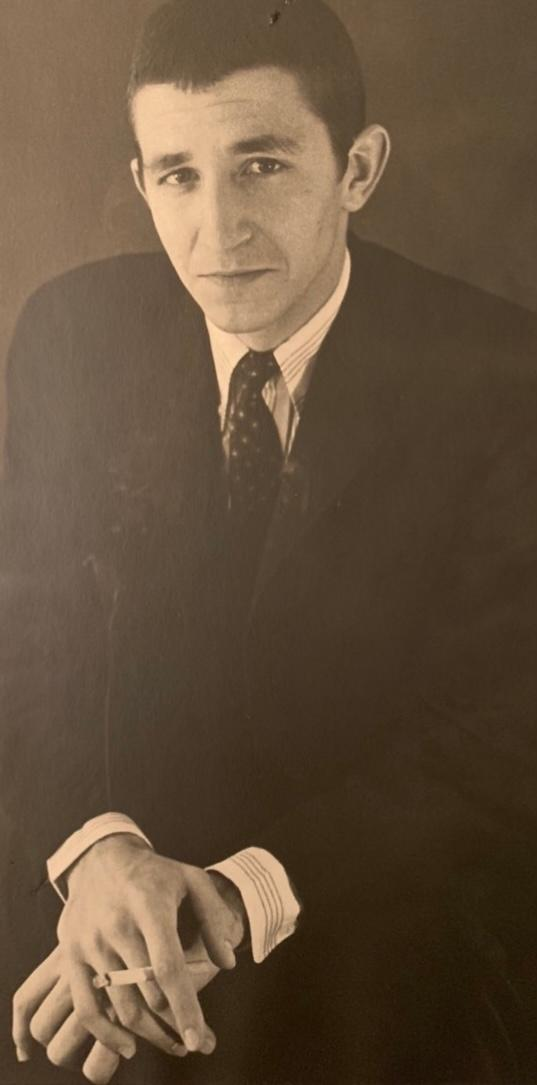
Ed Spielman

Ed Spielman (born in Brooklyn, New York City, US) is a writer and executive producer for television and film, an author and journalist. He is the creator of the Emmy Award winning TV series Kung Fu. Spielman wrote the story and teleplay for the series pilot (which was co-written with his friend Howard Friedlander). The pilot of Kung Fu has been credited as "the first American Martial Arts film."

On the week ending May 6, 1973, Kung Fu became the No. 1 show on US television, drawing a regular audience of 28 million viewers.

He also created the Emmy Award winning TV series The Young Riders starring Stephen Baldwin and Josh Brolin. Another of his television series, Dead Man's Gun (which debuted on Showtime in 1997, and which he produced in partnership with MGM Productions, Henry Winkler, Howard Spielman, and Sugar Entertainment, Ltd.) was nominated for three cable ACE Awards (including Best Dramatic Series) and received six LEO nominations.

Spielman has the rare distinction of being the only writer/producer in television history to have created and placed a Western series on the air — every decade for thirty years — at a time when Westerns were not even in vogue.

Spielman authored a biography of adventurer and health philosopher Joe Greenstein titled The Mighty Atom: The Life and Times of Joseph L. Greenstein, released in 1979. According to a reviewer with the American Library Association, The Mighty Atom was "one of the year's best books.". The book was later rereleased as The Spiritual Journey of Joseph L. Greenstein: The Mighty Atom, World's Strongest Man.

The National Cowboy & Western Heritage Museum has awarded Spielman personally the Western Heritage Award four times, and his shows seven times.

Spielman is currently an executive producer developing his original Kung Fu television series into a feature film at Universal Pictures. A life-long classic car and Italian motorcycle enthusiast, he is a member of the Ventura Sports & Race Car Club and he is the Master of Ceremonies at their yearly concours events. Spielman lives in Southern California with Bonnie (his wife of 50 years), a house full of rescued pets and a small fleet of vintage cars and motorcycles.
