= Hyman Grinstein =

Scholar of American Jewish history

Hyman B. Grinstein (Hebrew: ;חיים ב. גרינשטיין Nov. 15, 1899 - March 10, 1982) was an American educator and historian specializing in American Jewish history. His affiliation with Yeshiva University and its Teachers Institute, in administrative and teaching roles, spanned more than 50 years, and his historical articles appeared in journals for nearly as long. Grinstein’s magnum opus, The Rise of the Jewish Community of New York 1654-1860 (1945), about the "inner life" of that society, was “in many respects a turning point in the field.” It placed the author among “the best of the scholars working specifically in the field of American Jewish history,” and became “a classic”. Nearly four decades after its appearance, it was still “the standard starting point for all work on metropolitan area Jewish history”.

== Personal life ==
Grinstein was born in Dallas, Texas, to Henry Grinstein (d. 1908), a Russian native who served as a Dallas rabbi, and Rebecca (née Saxia, d. Aug. 15, 1929). Hyman Grinstein’s Russian middle name — “Bogomolny” (Russian: богомольный), which was not part of his professional signature — translates as "servant of God".

Grinstein’s early education was in Dallas and then, as a youth, in Petah Tikva in British Mandate Palestine. There he likely joined his brother Samuel B. Grinstein (d. 1968) at the local elementary Talmud Torah. Back in the United States, he attended the Rabbi Isaac Elchanan Theological Seminary (1920–23) and the Jewish Theological Seminary (1927-8). At the former seminary he was a student of Rabbi Abraham N. Perlberg (1889-1934), the Hebrew author and educator. He simultaneously earned degrees at Columbia University (BS, Oct. 1927; MA, 1936; PhD, 1944).

Grinstein was pre-deceased by two brothers and survived by two nephews. He was a life-long bachelor.

== Early Teaching and Administrative Career ==
During the first third of the 20th Century, Grinstein held a number of Jewish educational and administrative posts in New York while pursuing degrees at Columbia University. From 1917 to 1919 he was a part-time secretary to Bernard Revel, the founder of Yeshiva College, and for a short time secretary at the Teachers Institute (until 1922).

From 1919-22, he was assistant to the principal of the Talmudical Academy High School for Boys, the first U.S. high school in which secular and religious subjects were taught under Jewish auspices. In 1928, he was a teacher, and later principal, at the Talmud Torah Hebrew School of Jersey City Heights, New Jersey. From 1929-44, Grinstein was the principal of the religious school of Congregation Shaaray Tefilah, Far Rockaway, New York, then among the largest American Orthodox Jewish congregations (by the time Grinstein left the area, over half of its permanent residents were Jewish). He was an instructor in history at the School of Jewish Studies, Manhattan (1935-7) and from 1936 an instructor in extension courses at Yeshiva College.

== Teachers Institute and Yeshiva University ==
Grinstein’s connection with the Teachers Institute for Men dates to 1922, when he was its secretary. The institution, founded on May 1, 1917 by the Mizrachi organization to provide Orthodox instructors and supervisors for local and national Hebrew schools, was the first such Orthodox institution in the United States and the first U.S. teacher-training institution in which instruction was completely in Hebrew. In 1921 it became part of the Rabbi Isaac Elchanan Theological Seminary (ultimately a part of Yeshiva University).

In 1944, Grinstein returned to the Teachers Institute as a lecturer. In 1947, he was appointed its Registrar, and in October 1958 was named its director. He succeeded Pinkhos Churgin as the fourth head of the institution. Grinstein continued there as director and professor until his retirement in 1968.

During Grinstein’s tenure, Teachers Institute for Women was launched, and the Teachers Institute for Men began conferring a Bachelor of Hebrew Literature degree. One appraisal is that Grinstein took over a “foundering, struggling” institution, and left it in a “thriving” condition. From its founding, however, the Teachers Institute had faced serious opposition from within the Orthodox world, and later not less serious economic challenges during the depression years of 1930-7.

At Yeshiva University, Grinstein was assistant professor (1945–48), Associate Professor (1948 to 1950), and Professor of American Jewish history (1950 to 1970).

In 1968, Grinstein was named Yeshiva University's first archivist, remaining there until 1976.

== Critical Reception of Rise of the Jewish Community ==
The Jewish Publication Society, headquartered in Philadelphia, solicited for publication Grinstein’s doctoral dissertation, completed at Columbia University under Salo W. Baron. Edited to make it “interesting and readable” and to mute some of its anti-Reform statements, what became The Rise of the Jewish Community of New York was the publisher’s “most scholarly volume to date in American Jewish history.”

The goal of the book was to provide an objective account of the first 200 years of Jewish settlement in New York City (Peter Stuyvesant to the American Civil War), for what was in 1945 the largest Jewish community in history. Focusing on what Grinstein called the “inner life” of Jews, he used “a dazzling array of sources ... written in English, Hebrew, German, and Portuguese ... many of which are not available today.” Grinstein described Jewish institutions, Jewish religion and Jewish culture without consideration of the social, economic, or political interactions of Jews with non-Jews. In the process, he challenged the then-accepted notion that until the mid-19th Century, Sephardim (Spanish-Portuguese Jews) had continuously outnumbered German and East European immigrants to the United States. The historian ended his story in 1860, aware of the difficulty of adequately describing a Jewish community which numbered some 40,000 in that year and a century later 2.5 million. A continuation of The Rise of the Jewish Community of New York to cover 1860 to the present was contemplated, but never completed. Grinstein remained critical of those who took a short cut to that task.

Grinstein’s study was widely reviewed in the popular press, in academic journals of a general and religious nature, as well as in publications outside of the United States. There were comments about its academic origins (“Certainly, the average reader will not benefit from the German texts without their English translation”) and its objectivity. Most characterized it as “a pioneering job” which has “set a standard,” a "fascinating" even "outstanding" volume which "deserves to be in every Jewish home," "written well," “indispensable to the student of early American Jewish history” and “a model work of Jewish communal history." “He has been thorough in his research, considered in his historical judgments, penetrating in his underlying assumptions," wrote one historian. Another’s assessment was that the volume was “the first adequate account of the formative years of a Jewish community in the United States and makes a notable contribution both to the history of religion and of immigrant groups in America.”

== Public Positions ==
In his later years, Grinstein spoke on issues roiling the Jewish world. Before the creation of the State of Israel, Grinstein said he expected a “new world [which] will be developed under an international government” in which there will be “a new concept of nationalism and internationalism.” In 1966, just years after the founding of the Student Struggle for Soviet Jewry, he joined a petition urging Yeshiva College students to back the group. After the start of the Six-Day War in 1967, he was among 3,700 professors calling on the United States to maintain its support for Israel. In October 1969, during a period of American opposition to United States involvement in the Vietnam war, Grinstein publicly positioned himself in favor of the U.S. war effort.

== Scholarly Publications ==
=== Books ===
- The Rise of the Jewish Community of New York 1654-1860 (Philadelphia: Jewish Publication Society of America, 1945).
- A Short History of the Jews in the United States (London: Soncino Press, [1980]).

=== Articles (Selected) ===
- “Haym Salomon and His Business Connections in London and Amsterdam,” Horeb (Teachers Institute) vol. 1 (1934), 222-224 (Hebrew).
- “Literature of American Jewish History,” Horeb (Teachers Institute) vol. 4 (1937), 217-224 (Hebrew).
- “A Haym Salomon Letter to Rabbi David Tevele Schiff, London, 1784,” Publications of the American Jewish Historical Society XXXIV (Jan. 1937), 107-116.
- “American Jewry and Maimonides,” Publications of the American Jewish Historical Society XXXIV (1937), 268-270.
- “The Memoirs and Scrapbooks of the late Dr. Joseph Isaac Bluestone of New York City,” Publications of the American Jewish Historical Society XXXV (Jan. 1939), 53-64.
- “The ‘Asmonean’: The First Jewish Weekly in New York,” Journal of Jewish Bibliography I (April 1939), 67-71.
- “The Minute Book of Lilienthal’s Union of German Synagogues in New York,” Hebrew Union College Annual 18 (1943–44), 320-352.
- “Reforms at Temple Emanuel of New York: 1860-1890,” Historia Judaica VI (1944), 163-174.
- “Studies in the History of Jewish Education in New York City, 1728-1864,” Jewish Review 2 (April 1944), 41-58; (July-0ct. 1944), 187-201.
- “Communal and Social Aspects of American Jewish History,” Publications of the American Jewish Historical Society XXXIX (Sept. 1949), 267-282.
- “Writing the History of a Large American Jewish Community,” Publications of the American Jewish Historical Society XLVI (Sept. 1956), 170-6.
- “Orthodox Judaism and Early Zionism,” in Isidore S. Meyer (ed.), Early History of Zionism in America (New York: American Jewish Historical Society, 1958), 219-227.
- “Flight from the Slums,” in Joseph L. Blau, et al. (ed.), Essays on Jewish Life and Thought: Presented in Honor of Salo Wittmayer Baron (New York: Columbia University Press, 1959), 285-297.
- “The Efforts of East European Jewry to Organize its Own Community in the United States,” Publications of the American Jewish Historical Society XLIX (Sept. 1959), 73-89.
- “In the Course of the Nineteenth Century,” in Judah Pilch (ed.), A History of Jewish Education in America (New York: National Curriculum Research Institute of the American Association for Jewish Education, 1969), 25-50.
- “History of the Teachers Institute of Yeshiva University, 1917-1955,” in Moshe Carmilly and Hayim Leaf (eds.), Samuel Belkin Memorial Volume (New York: Yeshiva University, 1981), 257-266 (Hebrew).

=== Contributor ===
- Dictionary of American Biography
- Encyclopaedia Judaica

== Awards and Recognition ==
- American Jewish Historical Society Executive Council (1948), Recording Secretary (1955)
- Jewish Book Council (citation for contribution to literature of American Jewish history, 1954)
- Masmid 1967 (Yeshiva College student annual dedicated to Grinstein)
- Doctorate of Pedagogy (Hon.), Yeshiva University (1969)
