= Michal Grinstein-Weiss =

American economist

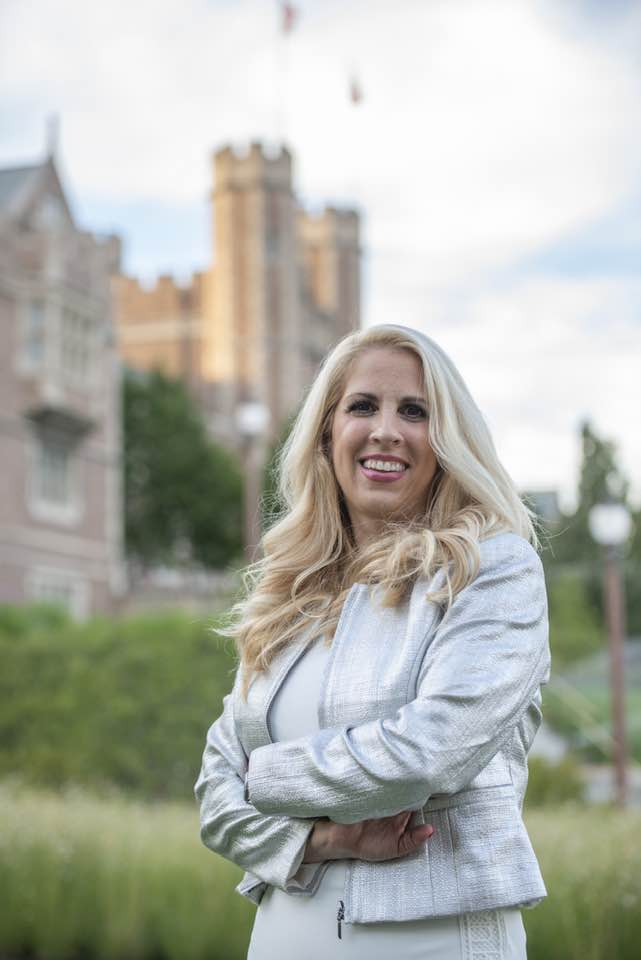

Academic background
- Education: Washington University in St. Louis; University of Missouri at St. Louis; University of Haifa

Academic work
- Discipline: Behavioral economics; Social and Economic Development; Savings and Asset Building; Tax-time Savings; Health Behavior Change

Michal Grinstein-Weiss, PhD, MSW, MA (Hebrew: מיכל גרינשטיין-וייס) is the Shanti K. Khinduka Distinguished Professor at the George Warren Brown School of Social Work at Washington University in St. Louis where she is also serves as the Associate Dean for Policy Initiatives, the director of the university-wide Social Policy Institute, and the founding director of the Centene Center for Health Transformation. She serves as a nonresident senior fellow at the Brookings Institution. She previously held positions as a professor at the University of North Carolina at Chapel Hill where she established the Asset-Building Research Group.

== Education and academic career ==
Dr. Grinstein-Weiss received her Ph.D. in social work at the Brown School at Washington University in St. Louis, her M.A. in economics from the University of Missouri, St. Louis, and her MSW and B.A. from Haifa University, Israel. After obtaining her PhD, she became a postdoctoral fellow at the Center for Social Development at Washington University in St. Louis and later joined University of North Carolina - Chapel Hill as a faculty member, where she founded the Asset-Building Research Group. In July 2012, Grinstein-Weiss merged her center with the Center for Social Development at Washington University in St. Louis. In 2015, she founded the Centene Center for Health Transformation, an industry-academic research collaboration with Fortune 100 company Centene Corporation.

She has held leadership roles with the Clinton Global Initiative and was identified as one of the highest-impact social work scholars by research on social work practice. Her honors include induction into the American Academy of Social Work and Social Welfare, the Deborah K. Padgett Early Career Achievement Award, and the Smith Richardson Foundation Domestic Public Policy Research Fellowship. Dr. Grinstein-Weiss served as associate policy editor for Behavioral Science and Policy and associate editor for Journal of the Society for Social Work and Research.

== Social Policy Institute ==
The Social Policy Institute at Washington University in St. Louis is devoted to advancing equitable social policies by conducting research, activating solutions and developing leaders. The institute, which launched in 2019, works to improve equity in four key areas—financial security, health, education and housing. SPI uses research to inform interventions and policy solutions, while also developing, educating and training new leaders to help move this important work forward. The institute informs policy change by sharing research findings and promising solutions with policymakers around the world with the goal that all people have equitable access to social and economic opportunities.

== Research ==
As a researcher in social mobility, Dr. Grinstein-Weiss is an influential voice in the design of innovative social policies in the United States and internationally. She conducts research on improving health and socio-economic mobility for low-income households by creating scalable, evidence-based interventions to inform and shape policy, domestically and internationally. Currently, she leads several large-scale research initiatives promoting financial inclusion and health equity through unique industry-academic and government-academic partnerships.

=== Research Partnerships ===
Dr. Grinstein-Weiss has been supported by government agencies including the U.S. Department of Treasury, U.S. Department of Education, U.S. Department of Health and Human Services, and the Consumer Financial Protection Bureau. In addition, her research won the support of philanthropic foundations such as the JPMorgan Chase Foundation, Ford Foundation, MacArthur Foundation, Smith Richardson Foundation, and Annie E. Casey Foundation. She also works closely in collaborations with industry partners, including Fortune-500 partners Intuit Inc. and Centene Corporation.

=== Global Policy Research ===
SPI has been growing its international research agenda through several research projects in Israel and Canada. Since 2017, the SPI researchers have been partnering with the National Insurance Institute of Israel to examine enrollment and participation patterns in Israel's universal Child Development Account program. In 2017 and 2018, the SPI team, Intuit, and representatives of the Canadian government have been discussing to pilot a savings-focused intervention in the tax-filing software in Canada. Since 2018, the SPI research team has been working with the Joint Distribution Committee in Israel (JDC-Israel) and researchers from several universities in Israel on developing and implementing behavioral interventions across a diverse set of social service programs.

=== Child Development Accounts ===
In addition to her most recent research efforts, Dr. Grinstein-Weiss is the principal investigator for a 10-year follow-up study of the American Dream Demonstration (ADD), the first large-scale test of Individual Development Accounts (IDAs) in the world. She also serves as consultant to the Israeli government on developing innovative universal savings policies and Child Development Accounts (CDAs).

Grinstein-Weiss was instrumental in the effort to create equal opportunities for children in Israel and narrow income gaps for the next generation through the establishment of child development accounts. The Knesset, Israel's national legislature, passed legislation in November 2015 that authorizes the development of and funding for long-term savings accounts for all newborns. Every baby born to an insured resident of Israel on or after January 1, 2017, will have an account established for his or her benefit. As part of this program, every child under the age of 18 in Israel gets a savings account opened in their name, and government makes monthly contributions in the amount of NIS 50 (approximately $14) to the child development accounts. In addition, parents can opt to transfer additional monthly NIS 50 from a separate child allowance into their children's accounts. Parents can also decide how to allocate their funds, choosing between an array of different investment options ranging from low-risk, low-yield bank accounts to high-risk, high-yield investment accounts. If parents do not make an investment decision in the first six months of the child's life, children are enrolled in the default track.

In partnership with the National Insurance Institute of Israel, which administers the child development account, the SPI research team is analyzing program enrollment and participation decisions of Israeli households that qualify for the SECP.

=== Socioeconomic Impact of COVID-19 Survey ===
In response to the COVID-19 pandemic, SPI administered the Socioeconomic Impacts of COVID-19 survey in both the United States and Israel. The survey had roughly 5,000 respondents per wave across five waves. Each wave was collected at 3-month intervals between late April 2020 and May 2021. The study asked respondents over 200 questions to understand the social and economic consequences of the COVID-19 pandemic.

SPI released a series of reports from the U.S. survey highlighting the impact of COVID-19 on housing, employment, and children and families, plus an assessment of public benefits.The survey from SPI points to the disproportionate impact of the pandemic on renters, racial/ethnic minority groups, parents, and the unemployed. Though public benefits and policies served as lifelines for Americans during the pandemic, they have also revealed some limitations. Findings include: · A third of households reported paying more than 30% of their income on housing (cost burdened); 57% of renters who fell behind on rent were cost burdened. Renters were at higher risk for financial hardship than homeowners. · Black and Hispanic households were 10% more likely to experience housing cost-burden than white or Asian households and were also more likely to fall behind on rent. · 22% of parents lost their job or income due to a disruption of child care. · Twice as many parents used their economic impact payment for housing than non-parents. · Furloughed employees were able to return to work full time at higher rates than employees who were laid off. · Financial hardship was three times higher among households in which someone lost a job. · Usage of public benefits (SNAP, TANF and unemployment insurance) increased during the pandemic, yet many households experienced long wait times, high rates of hardship and relied on high-cost alternative financial services.

=== Centene Center for Health Transformation ===
Grinstein-Weiss is the Founding Director of the Centene Center for Health Transformation, an academic-industry collaboration between the Brown School at Washington University in St. Louis, the Center for Advanced Hindsight at Duke University, and Centene Corporation. The center leverages the insights of Fortune 100-company Centene Corporation and subsidiary Envolve on managed care, along with the research and evaluation expertise of the Brown School and Duke University to design, implement, and evaluate behavior-based innovations that facilitate healthier living. The Centene Center's research goals include improving the effectiveness and reach of health programs, serving as a model organization for translational research, training, implementation and dissemination, and contributing to the scientific evidence about what works in changing health behavior, improving health outcomes, and facilitating fuller lives for consumers.

Grinstein-Weiss provides overall strategic, organizational, and scientific leadership for the Center along with the faculty directors and staff. She also serves as the faculty director in the center's Washington University Behavioral Economics workgroup, using behavior-based strategies from the social sciences to shift the perspectives and environments in which people make decisions to improve participation, outcomes, and overall effectiveness of healthcare interventions.

=== Financial Behaviors and Inclusion ===
Grinstein-Weiss leads several financial behavior and inclusion initiatives. For example, she leads financial wellness programs (FWPs) research and initiatives. In recent years, the number of FWPs have increased significantly, yet they operate at a small scale, and evidence concerning their efficacy is limited. New, scalable models must be developed to reach and serve economically vulnerable populations. Employer-sponsored FWPs have the potential to reach low- to moderate-income households at a much larger scale than community-based programs and in a financially sustainable manner. Also, employer-sponsored FWPs are promising because of an existing stable infrastructure for delivery.

Grinstein-Weiss also leads the Refund to Savings (R2S) Initiative, among other financial initiatives. R2S is the largest saving experiment conducted in the United States to date. R2S is a collaboration of academic researchers and tax industry experts from the Center for Social Development at Washington University in St. Louis, Duke University, and Intuit Inc., the maker of TurboTax tax preparation software. R2S builds a saving-promotion experiment into the TurboTax Free File Online product that is available free to low- and moderate-income households. R2S experiments measure the effect of behavioral economics techniques using a randomized controlled trial with the goal of increasing savings at tax time. The tax refund is the largest check most households receive all year, and because it is outside of normal budgets and income, it may present a golden moment to increase families’ financial security.

== Dissemination efforts ==
Her research crosses disciplines, informing policy makers, scholars in diverse fields, industry leaders, and practitioners. She has written numerous scholarly research articles that have appeared in a broad range of publications, including The New York Times, YNET, The Jerusalem Post, Haaretz, TheMarker, The Times of Israel, American Economic Journal, Social Service Review, Journal of Marriage and the Family, Children and Youth Services Review, Journal of Income Distribution, as well as other prominent research journals and government publications. Her work has been featured in numerous media outlets such as the Wall Street Journal, New York Times, CNBC, C-SPAN, CNN, NBS, National Public Radio, Forbes, Chicago Policy Review, and Daily Finance.

== Personal ==
Grinstein-Weiss is married and has four children.
