= Mike Greenstein =

American strength athlete

- Born: Morris Greenstein; December 6, 1920; Wichita Falls, Texas, U.S.
- Died: February 16, 2016 (aged 95); Miami Beach, Florida, U.S.
- Occupations: Former flight instructor, mechanic, businessman
- Known for: Strength athlete
- Relatives: Joe Greenstein (father)

Morris "Mike" Greenstein, also known as The Mighty Atom Jr., (December 6, 1920 – February 16, 2016) was an American strength athlete.

== Early life ==
Greenstein was born in Wichita Falls, Texas, on December 6, 1920 at a time when his father, legendary strongman Joe Greenstein ("The Mighty Atom"), was working in the oil fields in Texas. The family later moved to Brownsville, Brooklyn where the senior Greenstein began his shows as a miniature Samson in vaudeville and Yiddish theaters.

The senior Greenstein soon earned the nickname The Mighty Atom. Around that time, the junior began training with his father and his three brothers at a young age.

During World War II, he joined the United States Army Air Forces and was assigned a mechanic MOS. During that time, his father was touring the country entertaining troops and did shows to raise money for war bonds. Inspired by his father, the younger Greenstein decided to start an act of his own to entertain the troops at the various bases he was stationed in by bending bars, breaking chains, and pulling passenger-filled cars with his hair or his teeth. He also performed shows at theaters in the towns near the bases he was stationed during his off duty liberty.

He later attended aviation school in Manhattan, and subsequently worked at Trans World Airlines for 19 years. He also worked at local Waldbaum’s and photographed weddings.

== Career ==
Living his later years in Rockaway, Queens, New York, Greenstein was a strength athlete by profession, known as the Mighty Atom Jr. He was capable of pulling a car with his bare teeth, nearly to his dying day. Greenstein was an active advocate of cancer prevention; his father had died of cancer, and his wife and daughter both predeceased him due to breast cancer.

He was a contestant on season 9 of America's Got Talent at 93 years old and passed through the auditions round, but he was eliminated in the Judgement Round.

Greenstein died on February 16, 2016, while visiting family in Florida.
