= Nina Grunfeld =

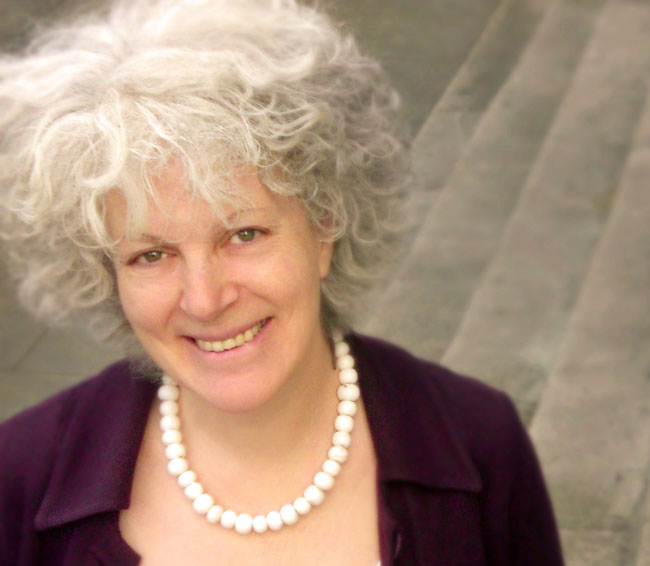
Nina Grunfeld

Nina Grunfeld (born 1954) is a British writer, journalist, public speaker and entrepreneur.

== Career ==
Trained as a graphic designer in Reading University and Harrow Art College her first book was Spot Check, a stain removal manual which sold widely. In 1982 she wrote The Royal Shopping Guide which detailed the UK's Royal Warrant Holders. With the birth of her first child in 1987 she wrote Pregnancy Week by Week for the baby and child chain of shops, Mothercare.

Together with her old nanny, Nanny Smith she created the Nanny Knows Best series of books and the 1993 BBC1 television series of the same name.

In 2004 she wrote The Big Book of Me, started her Get a Life column for the Daily Telegraph and founded Life Clubs, a workshop-based system for self-development.
