= Yehuda Grunfeld =

Econometrician and professor (1930–1960)

- Born: March 11, 1930
- Died: July 16, 1960 (aged 30); Israel
- Education: B.A. & MA, Hebrew University; PhD, U. of Chicago (1958)
- Occupation: Econometrician

Yehuda Grunfeld (also Grünfeld; March 11, 1930 – July 16, 1960) was an econometrician in the late 1950s whose data sets outlived him by decades.

== Personal life ==
Grunfeld was born on March 11, 1930. On July 16, 1960, he drowned while rescuing his son from an undertow off the coast of Israel.

== Career ==
At Hebrew University, Grunfeld received his Bachelor of Arts in 1953, and his Master of Arts in 1955, both in economics.

From 1957–58, Grunfeld was an assistant professor of economics at the University of Chicago (UChicago). His 1958 doctoral thesis at UChicago is The Determinants of Corporate Investment; as of 2010, its appendix contained "one of the most widely used data sets in all of econometrics." In 1959, his Journal of Business article was given the McKinsey Award. By 1960, he was a lecturer of economics and statistics at the Hebrew University of Jerusalem, and scheduled to become a professor at UChicago at the end of July.
