= Jim Greenbaum =

Jim Greenbaum is a former telecom entrepreneur who made a fortune through his telecom company Access Long Distance, and then switched to full-time philanthropy through his foundation, the Greenbaum Foundation.

== Telecom executive ==
In 1985, Greenbaum founded and became the CEO of Access Long Distance, a telecommunications company. In 1992, a profile of the company in Deseret News noted that Greenbaum and his colleagues attributed much of the company's success to the spirit of teamwork as there were many former collegiate football players in senior management at the company. By 1993, the company was in eight states in the Western United States: Utah, Arizona, Nevada, Idaho, Washington, Oregon, Colorado, and California. In 1999, after reaching annual revenue of $100 million, the company sold to McLeod USA for $250 million.

== Philanthropy ==
Greenbaum carries out his philanthropic activities through his foundation, the Greenbaum Foundation, which is registered in West Hollywood, California, and currently focuses on alleviating suffering, with particular emphasis on human rights, women and girls, non-human animals, and promoting whole foods plant based diets. The Foundation's tag line is "Being a bystander to suffering is not an option."

Greenbaum has stated that he was initially interested in a career as a human rights lawyer to fight injustice. However, after he was rejected from top law schools, he decided to instead make a huge amount of money by the age of 40 and then work full-time on efficient philanthropy with the money.

The Greenbaum Foundation was created by Greenbaum in 1992. Although philanthropy was something that interested him even while he was building a business, he deliberately chose to focus on growing the business and delay most of his philanthropy. After the successful sale of Access Long Distance, Greenbaum's finances grew to $133 million. He switched to working full-time on the Greenbaum Foundation, using his wide reading about the world as a starting point for his journey into the philanthropic world.

His initial focus was on rescuing kids from bad conditions in orphanages, and he poured money into KidSave International, a project focused on doing so in the former Soviet Republics. He gradually became more interested in the problem of human trafficking, and donated to a number of charities to combat it. In 2007, he discovered Tostan, that he praised for trying to engender behavior change in communities to have a long-term impact on issues ranging from female genital cutting to child marriage.

In 2009, Jim's eyes were opened to the importance of animal rights and protection. Since 2012, the Greenbaum Foundation has been making donations to animal related charities.

Greenbaum has also donated to global health causes such as the response to the ebola virus epidemic in West Africa and more long-run human health causes.

A profile of Greenbaum in 2003 noted that, unlike many other donors, he preferred to keep a low profile. In 2013, he watched a TED talk by Peter Singer about effective altruism, The why and how of effective altruism, and began identifying as an effective altruist. Inspired by the talk, he decided to be more public about his giving. He committed to spending down the Greenbaum Foundation and at least 85% of his personal holdings to charitable causes before his death (this would amount to over $100 million), and the remainder soon thereafter. Greenbaum is divorced and resides in West Hollywood, California.

Greenbaum is a member of Giving What We Can, a community of people who have pledged to give at least 10% of their income to effective charities.

== Media coverage ==
Greenbaum's early foray into philanthropy was covered by the Associated Press in 2003.

The Greenbaum Foundation's work on animal welfare has been profiled by Inside Philanthropy.

Inside Philanthropy has also profiled the Greenbaum Foundation's overall approach to philanthropy. Based on an email exchange with Greenbaum, it identified three things he looks for when making funding decisions:

1. Efficiency and innovation are crucial
2. Change comes from within a community
3. It's all about the leadership

Greenbaum's Giving What We Can pledge to donate his money has also been covered in press on Giving What We Can.

== See also ==
- Peter Singer
- Toby Ord
