= Vurğun =

- Municipality
- Location within Azerbaijan
- Coordinates: 41°05′42″N 45°28′31″E
- Country: Azerbaijan
- Rayon: Agstafa

Population
  - Total: 2,710
- Time zone: UTC+4 (AZT)
  - Summer (DST): UTC+5 (AZT)

Vurğun (also, Grünfeld, Kalininkänd, and Kalininkend) is a village and municipality in the Agstafa Rayon of Azerbaijan. It has a population of 2,710. Founded as the German colony of Grünfeld, the town was renamed during the Soviet period for Mikhail Kalinin, and afterward in 1991, in honor of the writer Samad Vurgun.

The village is also home to a portion of Azerbaijan's Assyrian community, who settled in the 1930's after the events of the Assyrian genocide.
