= Robert Lyon (journalist) =

American journalist

- Born: January 15, 1810; London, England
- Died: March 10, 1858 (aged 48); New York City, New York, U.S.
- Occupations: Journalist, newspaper editor
- Children: 6 (including William)
- Writing career
- Notable works: Founder and editor of The Asmonean

Robert Lyon (January 15, 1810 – March 10, 1858) was an English-born Jewish-American journalist and newspaper editor.

== Life ==
Lyon was born on January 15, 1810, in London, England, the son of tradesman Wolfe Lyon.

Lyon initially worked as a merchant in London and joined the Maiden Lane Synagogue. In 1840, upon the marriage of Queen Victoria, he accompanied Baron de Goldsmid to personally present a congratulatory address to her.

Lyon immigrated to America in 1844, settling in New York City, New York, and establishing an unsuccessful umbrella manufactory. He had essays published before he turned eighteen, when his essays were published in Jersey, where he was living at the time. During his early years in America, he contributed the occasional article essay to various periodicals. He then began to take an interest in the local Jewish community, which lacked its own newspaper. This led him to begin publishing The Asmonean, the first English-language Jewish weekly newspaper in America, on October 19, 1849. He ran the paper until his death. Jewish writers like Isaac Mayer Wise were regular contributors to the paper, although it never achieved more than local fame. He also edited the New York Mercantile Journal, which was focused on trade.

Lyon died at home on March 10, 1858. He was struck with paralysis while working in his office and was brought home three hours before his death. He had six children, the eldest being the fifteen-year-old William.

Neither of Lyon's papers lasted long after his death, although he laid the groundwork for future Jewish-American papers that appeared by 1880 like The American Israelite, The Jewish Messenger, The Hebrew Leader, The Jewish Record, and The American Hebrew.
