= Color of the day (police) =

Signal used by police in New York City to recognize undercover officers

The color of the day is a signal used by plainclothes officers of some police departments in the United States. It is used to assist in the identification of plainclothes police officers by those in uniform. It is used by the New York City Police Department and other law enforcement agencies.

A plainclothes police officer will wear a headband, wristband or other piece of clothing in the color of the day, and officers will be told of this color at the police station before they start work. The system is for officer safety and first started during the violence of the 1970s and 1980s in New York City.

== Purpose ==
The purpose of the color of the day system is to provide for discreet identification of plainclothes officers by uniformed ones.

== History ==
The now-defunct NYPD Street Crime Unit started in 1971. From the late 1970s through the early 1990s, crime in New York City was at record levels. Undercover officers were asked to go into the New York City Subway and other high-risk areas in plain clothes, or dressed as a homeless person or as a decoy for those victimizing at-risk groups. Many of these officers feared that uniformed officers would mistake them for criminals in a use of force situation, so the wearing of a headband or wristband colored with the color of the day system was developed to prevent friendly-fire incidents.

== See also ==
- Law enforcement in New York City
