= Lyons family =

Anglo-Norman family

House of Lyons (de Lyons, de Leonne, Lyonne, Lyon)
- Country: England; Ireland, Antigua, and Hampshire; United States
- Founded: 1066 (in England); 1622 (in Ireland); <1700 (in Antigua).
- Founder: Ingelram de Lyons The Elder (1066); Nicholas de Lyons and his son Sir John de Lyons (1080)
- Titles: Baron of Corsham and Culington; Lord of Warkworth, Northamptonshire; Baronet, of Christchurch, Southampton; Baron Lyons of Christchurch, Southampton; Viscount Lyons of Christchurch, Southampton; Earl Lyons of Christchurch, Southampton; Baroness von Wurtzburg; 14th Duchess of Norfolk

The Lyons family (originally styled de Lyons, also spelled de Leonne, and also spelled Lyon) is an Anglo-Norman landed gentry family descended from Ingelram de Lyons The Elder, who arrived in England with the Norman Conquest of 1066 and fought at the Battle of Hastings. His son Nicholas de Lyons, who, with his son Sir John de Lyons, emigrated from Normandy to England in 1080, was granted lands at Warkworth, Northamptonshire, by William.

The Norman family surname was 'de Lyons' ('of [the Castle and Forest of] Lyons'): but the 'de' was eventually omitted from the surname of the emigrant family. Subsequently (as a consequence of the lack, before the 18th century, of standardised spelling for the French pronunciation of the surname) some English branches removed the 's' from the end of the surname, producing 'Lyon'. For example, the 16th century Lord Mayor of London Sir John Lyon used the spelling 'Lyon', despite that his father, Thomas Lyons [sic] of Perivale, used the spelling 'Lyons'.

The English line of the Norman Warkworth family had ceased to reside at Warkworth by the 16th century, after which they resided predominantly in Middlesex. Its descendants included Sir John Lyon or Lyons (1514 - 1564), who was Lord Mayor of London, and the yeoman landowner John Lyon (d. 1592), who was the founder of Harrow School, after whom The John Lyon School, and The John Lyon's Charity, and a Harrow School house, Lyon's, are named.

In 1622, a branch of the family settled in Ireland, where, as members of the Protestant Ascendancy, they established a seat at King's County that was named River Lyons, and a seat at County Westmeath that was named Ledestown/Ledistown Hall. This Irish branch of the family owned 563 acres of sugar plantations in Antigua and was famous within the Royal Navy during the 19th-century peak of Britain's imperial power: three of its members attained the rank of Admiral and five others were senior officers.

Its descendants include Vice-Admiral John Lyons, who fought on HMS Victory at Battle of Trafalgar; Admiral Edmund Lyons, 1st Baron Lyons, who led the Royal Navy to victory during the Crimean War; Richard Lyons, 1st Viscount Lyons, the British Ambassador to France and to the USA who resolved the Trent Affair; and Sir Algernon Lyons, Admiral of the Fleet.

== Norman Origin ==
The family derives its name from the district of the Forest of Lyons, north of the town of Lyons-la-Forêt in Haute Normandie, where their seat was the Castle of Lyons. During the first decades of the 12th century, Henry I of England built a new castle in the district, the Château de Lyons-la-Forêt, where he died in 1135.

The Norman family surname was 'de Lyons' ('of [the Castle and Forest of] Lyons'): but the 'de' was eventually omitted from the surname of the emigrant family. Subsequently (as a consequence of the lack, before the 18th century, of standardised spelling for the French pronunciation of the surname) some English branches removed the 's' from the end of the surname, producing 'Lyon'. For example, the 16th century Lord Mayor of London Sir John Lyon used the spelling 'Lyon', despite that his father, Thomas Lyons [sic] of Perivale, used the spelling 'Lyons'.

== Warkworth Northamptonshire Line ==
In 1066, Ingelram de Lyons The Elder arrived in England with the Norman Conquest to fight at the Battle of Hastings, after which he was granted lands in Corsham and Culington. He is listed as a companion of William the Conqueror in the Battle Abbey Roll. His son Nicholas de Lyons, who with his son Sir John de Lyons emigrated from Normandy to England in 1080, was granted lands at Warkworth, Northamptonshire, by William the Conqueror. Nicholas's grandson, who was also named John (b. 1100), travelled to the Holy Land.

Nicholas de Lyons's descendants subsequently bought Warkworth Castle, Northamptonshire, which was the English seat of the Lyons family until 1412. It was a castellated mansion that consisted of a body with two wings, forming three sides of a quadrangle, with a large gatehouse and semi-circular towers. It was converted into a spectacular house by subsequent owners, during the Jacobean period, but was demolished c.1805.

Some amateur genealogies incorrectly state that the seat of the Lyons was Warkworth Castle in Northumberland: this is incorrect, Warkworth Castle in Northumberland belonged to the Percy family. The English seat of the Lyons family was the identically named Warkworth Castle in Northamptonshire.

Notable members of the Warkworth family include Sir John de Lyons (c. 1268–1313) and his son Sir John de Lyons (c. 1289-1371), who was Lord of Warkworth in 1322 and fought at the Battle of Crecy and the Battle of Poitiers, both of whom are interred in tombs with effigies at the Church of St. Mary, Warkworth, Northamptonshire. Other notable members of the Warkworth family were William Lyons, Governor of Bordeaux during the reign of Henry V of England (c. 1420), and Sir Richard Lyons, Governor of Calais during the reign of Henry VIII. Elizabeth, the daughter and heir of the aforementioned Sir John Lyons (d. c. 1371), married Sir John Chetwode, to whom the Lyons estate at Warkworth passed when she died without male siblings, after which Chetwode adopted the older Lyons coat-of-arms and the title 'Lord of Warkworth'.

== Alleged Scottish Line ==
It dubiously has been asserted that Sir John Lyon (1289–1348), Baron of Forteviot, Forgandenny, and Drumgawan (whose ancestors emigrated to Scotland the end of the eleventh century, in the retinue of Edgar, to fight against Donald Bane, and were granted lands in Perthshire that were later called Glen Lyon) was a descendant of the Norman family.

His son was Sir John Lyon, Thane of Glamis (1340–1382), who married a daughter of Robert II of Scotland, for whom he served as Chamberlain of Scotland: this Sir John Lyon was known as 'The White Lyon' due to his pale complexion.

However, the usually reliable genealogist Sir Iain Moncreiffe stated that the Scottish Clan Lyon were of Celtic, not Norman, origin and that they were descended from a younger son of the Clan Lamont, not from this nor any French family.

== Irish Protestant Ascendancy ==
The grandson of Sir Richard Lyons, Governor of Calais during the reign of Henry VIII, was Captain William Lyons, who was a Huguenot supporter of Henry of Navarre, and who fled to England after the Massacre of St. Bartholomew in 1572, entered the army of Elizabeth I, and, in 1599, commanded a company of cavalry, under the Earl of Essex, in the Tudor conquest of Ireland. William was consequently granted the estate of Clonarrow, subsequently known as River Lyons, in King's County, the transfer of which to him occurred in 1622, after which his family settled in Ireland. William also bought the lands of Mullalough, Casement, Killeen, and Killowen, together constituting over 3000 acres, in the same County.

The Irish seat of the Protestant Lyons family was Ledestown/Ledistown Hall, Mullingar, County Westmeath. Several members of the Irish family served as High Sheriff of Westmeath and High Sheriff of King’s County during the 17th and 18th centuries.

Major John Charles Lyons JP DL (1792 - 1874) was the son of Charles John Lyons and Mary Anne Levinge, and the grandson of John Lyons, who was High Sheriff of Westmeath in 1778. He was High Sheriff of Westmeath in 1816, and his son Charles Lyons JP DL was later High Sheriff of Westmeath.

=== Antigua and Hampshire Line ===
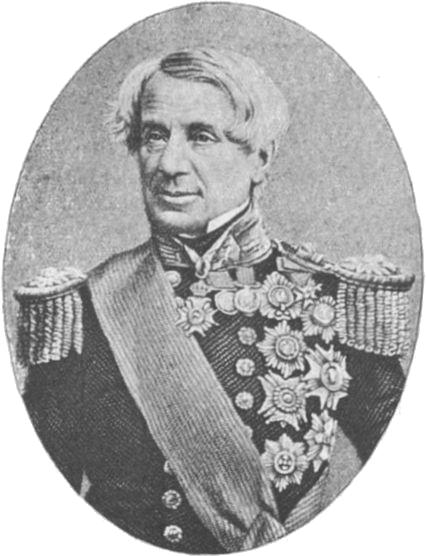
Admiral Lord Edmund Lyons, 1st Baron Lyons

Major Henry Lyons was the grandson of Captain William Lyons of River Lyons (d. 1633) and Margaret, who was the daughter of Sir Thomas Moore of Crogham. He married Lady Anne Rochfort who was the sister of the 1st Earl of Belvedere, and emigrated from River Lyons, King's County, Ireland and Ledestown/Ledistown Hall, County Westmeath, to the 563 acre Lyons estate of sugar plantations in Antigua that had been founded by Major John Lyons of Westmeath. Henry served as a member of the Council of Antigua in 1710. His son and grandson and great-grandson served as members of the Council of Antigua.

The great-grandson of Henry Lyons was Captain John Lyons (1760 - 1816) who, as the eldest of 11 children, inherited the 563 acre Lyons estate of sugar plantations in Antigua. He was sworn in as a member of the Council of Antigua in 1782. He married Catherine Walrond, who was the daughter of the 5th Marquis de Vallado and of the same's wife Sarah Lyons (1731-1764), by whom he had 15 children, including Vice-Admiral John Lyons, who fought on HMS Victory at Battle of Trafalgar, and Admiral Edmund Lyons, 1st Baron Lyons, who led the Royal Navy to victory during the Crimean War and served as Ambassador to Sweden, and to Switzerland, and to the court of King Otto of Greece. Three of his descendants attained the rank of Admiral and five others were senior officers within the Royal Navy during the 19th-century peak of Britain's imperial power.

Captain John Lyons's grandchildren included Richard Lyons, 1st Viscount Lyons, who was Queen Victoria's favourite diplomat, who served as British Ambassador to the United States during the American Civil War, during which he resolved the Trent Affair, and as British Ambassador to France, and who founded a "Lyons School" of British international diplomacy. Captain John Lyons's grandchildren also included Augusta Minna Lyons, Duchess of Norfolk and Sir Algernon Lyons, Admiral of the Fleet.

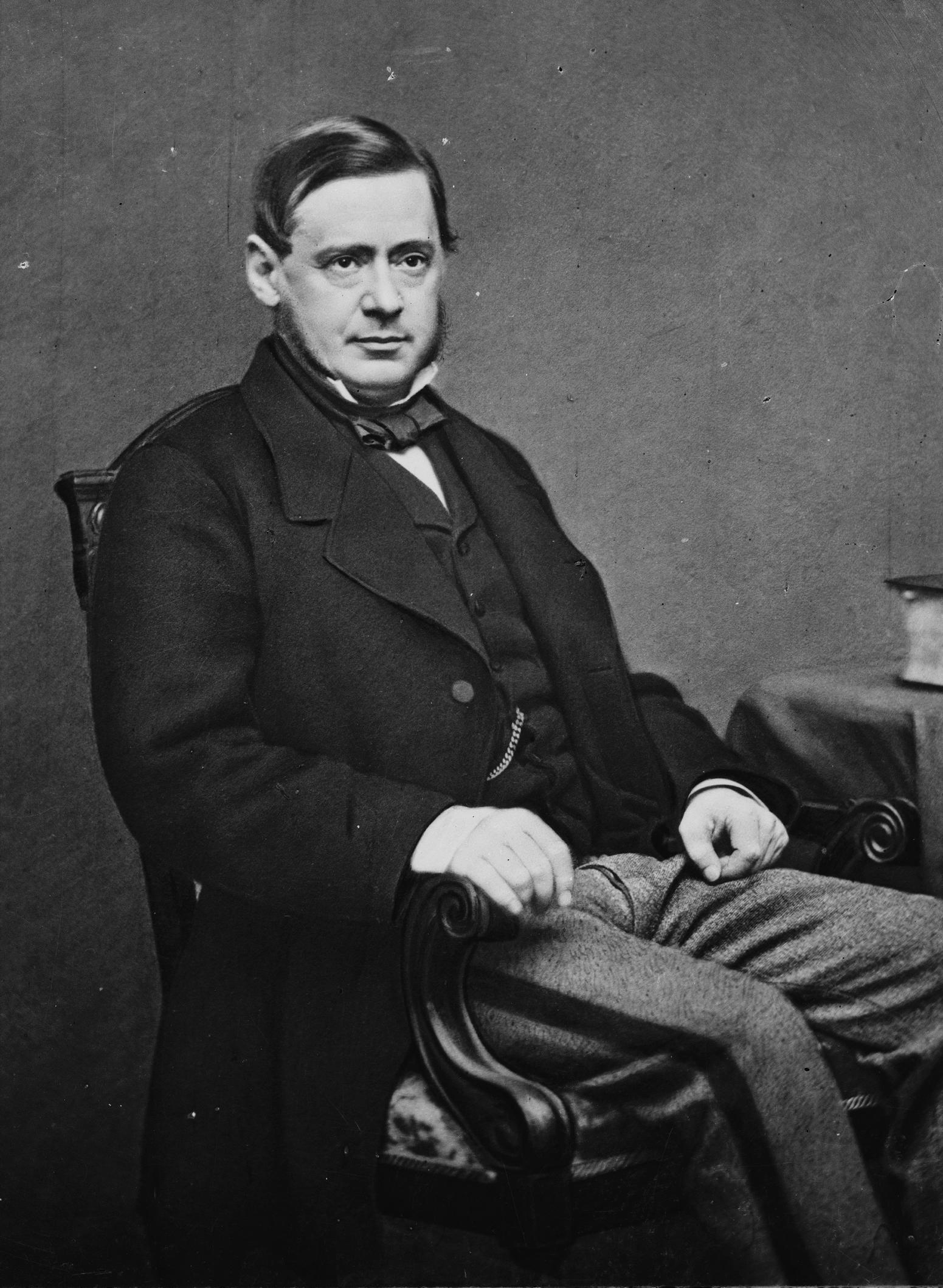
Richard Lyons, 1st Viscount Lyons, photographed by Mathew Brady

== Middlesex Line ==
Arms of John Lyon (d. 1592)

Sir John Lyon (b.1353) owned lands in Middlesex in addition to lands in Norfolk and Suffolk. Sir Henry Lyon (b. 1355) moved to Middlesex. From the this English line of the Lyons family descended Sir John Lyon or Lyons (1514-1564), who was Lord Mayor of London from 1554 to 1555, and the yeoman landowner John Lyon (d.1592), who was the founder of Harrow School,, after whom The John Lyon School, The John Lyon's Charity, and a Harrow School house, Lyon's, are named.

The Middlesex line owned substantial estates at Harrow-on-the-Hill where John Lyon (d.1592) resided at Preston Hall in Harrow, Middlesex, and, in 1564, had the largest land-rental income in Harrow. There are memorials to this John Lyon (d. 1592) and his wife, Joan Lyon, at St Mary's, Harrow on the Hill.

== American Emigrants ==
During the 17th century members of the English family emigrated to New England. William Lyon (1620 -1692) was the first Lyon to emigrate to America, in September 1635.

Brigadier General Nathaniel Lyon, the first Union General to be killed in the American Civil War, was a descendant of the family's emigrants to New England. He received the Thanks of Congress and 15,000 people attended his funeral. The 24th Missouri Volunteer Infantry was recruited as "The Lyon Legion" in his honour, and carried a unique regimental colour that depicted a lion beneath a constellation of six stars.

Lyon County, Iowa, Lyon County, Kansas, Lyon County, Minnesota, Lyon County, Nevada, and the Lyons valley in Jamul, California, are named after him. Fort Lyon in Colorado, Fort Lyon in Virginia, Lyon Park in St. Louis, Missouri, Lyon Street in San Francisco, and Lyon Lane in Carson City, Nevada, are also named after him.

== Notable members ==
=== Norman Emigrants ===
- Ingelram de Lyons The Elder, and his son Nicholas de Lyons, and the same's son Sir John de Lyons, all of Normandy

=== Warkworth Northamptonshire Line ===
- Sir John de Lyons (c. 1268–1313). His tomb and effigy remains at the Church of St. Mary, Warkworth, Northamptonshire.
- Sir John de Lyons (c. 1289-1371), who was Lord of Warkworth in 1322, and who fought at the Battle of Crecy and the Battle of Poitiers. His tomb and effigy remains at the Church of St. Mary, Warkworth, Northamptonshire.
- William Lyons, who was Governor of Bordeaux during the reign of Henry V of England
- Sir Richard Lyons, who was Governor of Calais during the reign of Henry VIII

=== Middlesex Line (Descended from Warkworth Northamptonshire Line) ===
- Sir John Lyon or Lyons (1514 - 1564), Lord Mayor of London from 1554 to 1555. (His father Thomas Lyons [sic] of Perivale, Middlesex, used the 's' spelling of the name. The difference in spelling is because the phonetic spelling of the French pronunciation of the name was not standardised until after the 17th century).
- John Lyon (d. 1592), yeoman landowner and founder of Harrow School, after whom The John Lyon School, and The John Lyon's Charity, and a Harrow School house, Lyon's, are named
- Sir Algernon Lyons, Admiral of the Fleet

=== Irish Protestant Ascendancy and Antiguan Immigrants ===
- Sarah Lyons (1731 - 1764), 5th Marquise de Vallado
- Captain John Lyons of Antigua
- Admiral John Lyons (1787 – 1872), fought on HMS Victory at the Battle of Trafalgar
- Admiral Edmund Lyons, 1st Baron Lyons, British diplomat in Europe and naval leader during the Crimean War
- Major John Charles Lyons JP DL, Anglo-Irish politician and landowner
- Lieutenant-General Humphrey Lyons, British Indian Army
- Richard Lyons, 1st Earl Lyons, 1st Viscount Lyons, the favourite diplomat of Queen Victoria who served as British Ambassador to the United States, as which he resolved the Trent Affair; and as British Ambassador to France, as which he forecast the First World War; and was the founder of the "Lyons School" of British diplomacy
- Captain Edmund Moubray Lyons, Royal Navy Captain during Crimean War
- Anne Theresa Bickerton Lyons, Baroness von Würtzburg
- Augusta Mary Minna Catherine Lyons, 14th Duchess of Norfolk
- Richard Lyons Pearson, Lieutenant-Colonel Grenadier Guards
- Sir Algernon Lyons, Admiral of the Fleet

=== American Immigrants ===
- Brigadier General Nathaniel Lyon, First Union General to be killed in the American Civil War
