= Viscount Lyons =

Extinct viscountcy in the Peerage of the United Kingdom

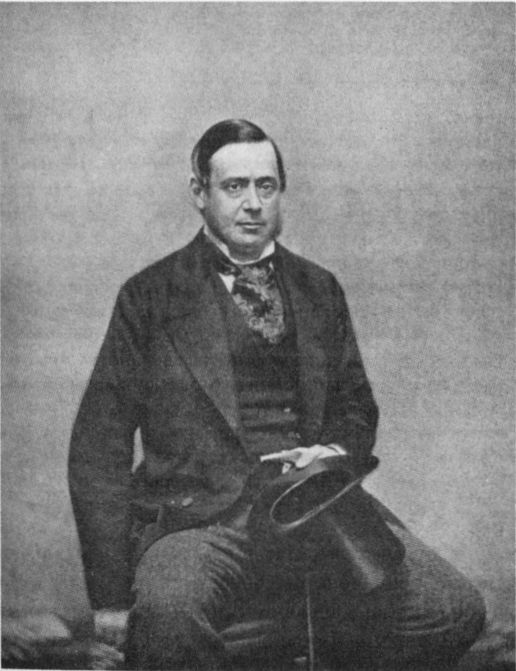
Richard Lyons, 1st Viscount Lyons

Viscount Lyons, of Christchurch in the County of Southampton, was a title in Peerage of the United Kingdom. It was created on 24 November 1881 for the diplomat Richard Lyons, 2nd Baron Lyons. It later was announced that he was to be created an Earl, but he died before that title's patent was sealed, after which all of his titles became extinct.

The title of Baron Lyons, of Christchurch in the County of Southampton, had been created in the Peerage of the United Kingdom, on 25 June 1856, for his father, the British Admiral and diplomat Sir Edmund Lyons, 1st Baronet, who previously had been created a baronet, also of Christchurch in the County of Southampton, in the Baronetage of the United Kingdom, on 29 July 1840.

Viscount Lyons was the grandson of the landowner Captain John Lyons of Antigua; and the nephew of Vice-Admiral John Lyons (1787 - 1872) who had fought on HMS Victory at Battle of Trafalgar and served as British Ambassador in Egypt; and the nephew of Lieutenant-General Humphrey Lyons; and the first cousin of Admiral of the Fleet Sir Algernon Lyons.

== Barons Lyons (1856) ==
- Edmund Lyons, 1st Baron Lyons (1790–1858)
- Richard Bickerton Pemell Lyons, 2nd Baron Lyons (1817–1887)

== Viscounts Lyons (1881) ==
- Richard Bickerton Pemell Lyons, 1st Viscount Lyons (1817–1887)

== Earls Lyons (1887) ==
- Richard Bickerton Pemell Lyons, 2nd Baron Lyons (1817–1887). (He died before he had formally received the title of Earl Lyons: but, because the notice of his investiture with that title had appeared in the London Gazette, he is usually termed 1st Earl Lyons, as in his most recent biography (2014) by Brian Jenkins).
