= John Charles Lyons =

Protestant Irish landowner, politician and horticulturist

- Born: 22 August 1792
- Died: 3 September 1874 (aged 82)
- Education: Pembroke College, Oxford
- Occupations: Politician; antiquary
- Known for: Protestant Irish landowner

Major John Charles Lyons (1792–1874) was a Protestant Irish politician, antiquary, and horticulturist.

== Family ==
John Charles was the only child of Captain Charles John Lyons (1766 - 1796), of the 12th Light Dragoons, and Mary Anne Levinge, the daughter of Sir Richard Levinge, 4th Baronet. His paternal grandfather was John Lyons (d.1803), who was High Sheriff of Westmeath in 1778.

John Charles was a cousin of Edmund Lyons, 1st Baron Lyons, and Richard Lyons, 1st Viscount Lyons.

=== English origin ===
The Irish Protestant Lyons family were not ethnically Irish, but English members of the Protestant Ascendancy who had been granted land in Ireland by James I. The grandson of Sir Richard Lyons, who was Governor of Calais during the reign of Henry VIII, was Captain William Lyons, a Huguenot and supporter of Henry of Navarre, and who fled to England, after the Massacre of St. Bartholomew in 1572, and entered the army of Elizabeth I, in which, in 1599, he commanded a company of cavalry, under the Earl of Essex, in the Tudor conquest of Ireland.

Captain William was consequently granted the estate of Clonarrow, subsequently known as River Lyons, in King's County, the transfer of which to Lyons occurred in 1622, after which his family settled in Ireland. William also bought the lands of Mullalough, Casement, Killeen, and Killowen, together constituting over 3000 acres, in the same County.

The Irish seat of the Lyons family was Ledestown/Ledistown Hall, Mullingar, County Westmeath. Several members of the Irish family served as High Sheriff of Westmeath and High Sheriff of King’s County during the 17th and 18th centuries.

== Life ==
John Charles inherited the Irish estate of the Lyons family in 1803. He matriculated at Pembroke College, Oxford, on 21 May 1810, but did not complete a degree. He served as High Sheriff of Westmeath in 1816.

He married twice and had issue by both wives. One of his sons, Charles Lyons JP, DL, also served as High Sheriff of Westmeath.

John Charles composed published works on horticulture, literature, and antiquities.

== See also ==
- Lyons family
