= John Lyon (school founder) =

Elizabethan landowner and founder of Harrow School

- Born: c. 1514; Harrow-on-the-Hill, Middlesex
- Died: 1592
- Resting place: St Mary's, Harrow on the Hill
- Occupation: Charitable landowner
- Known for: Founder of Harrow School (1572); Benefactor of The John Lyon School; Benefactor of The John Lyon Charity
- Relatives: Sir John Lyon or Lyons (1514 - 1564) who was Lord Mayor of London from 1554 to 1555 (first cousin)
- Family: Lyons family

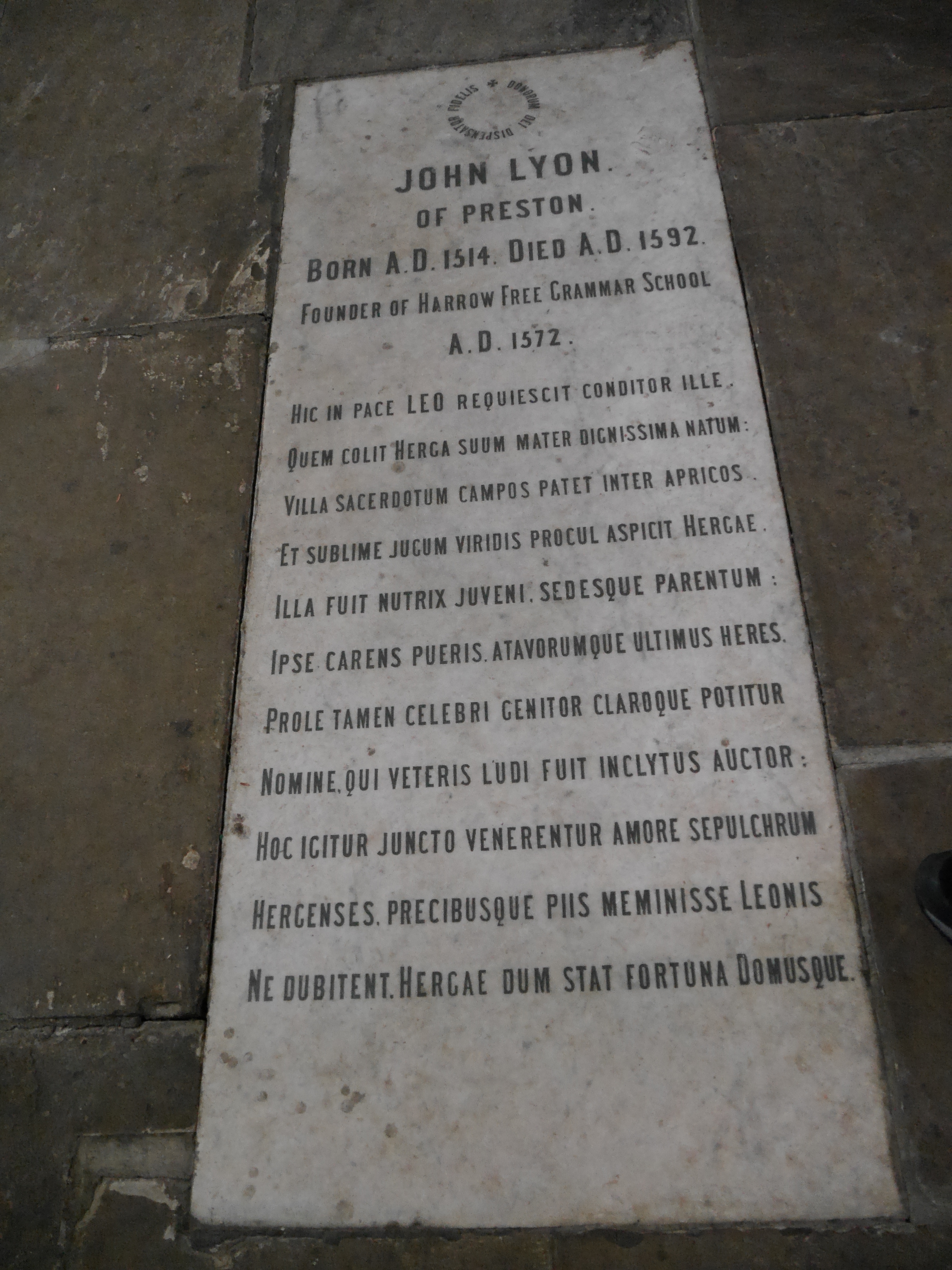
John Lyon memorial, St Mary's, Harrow on the Hill

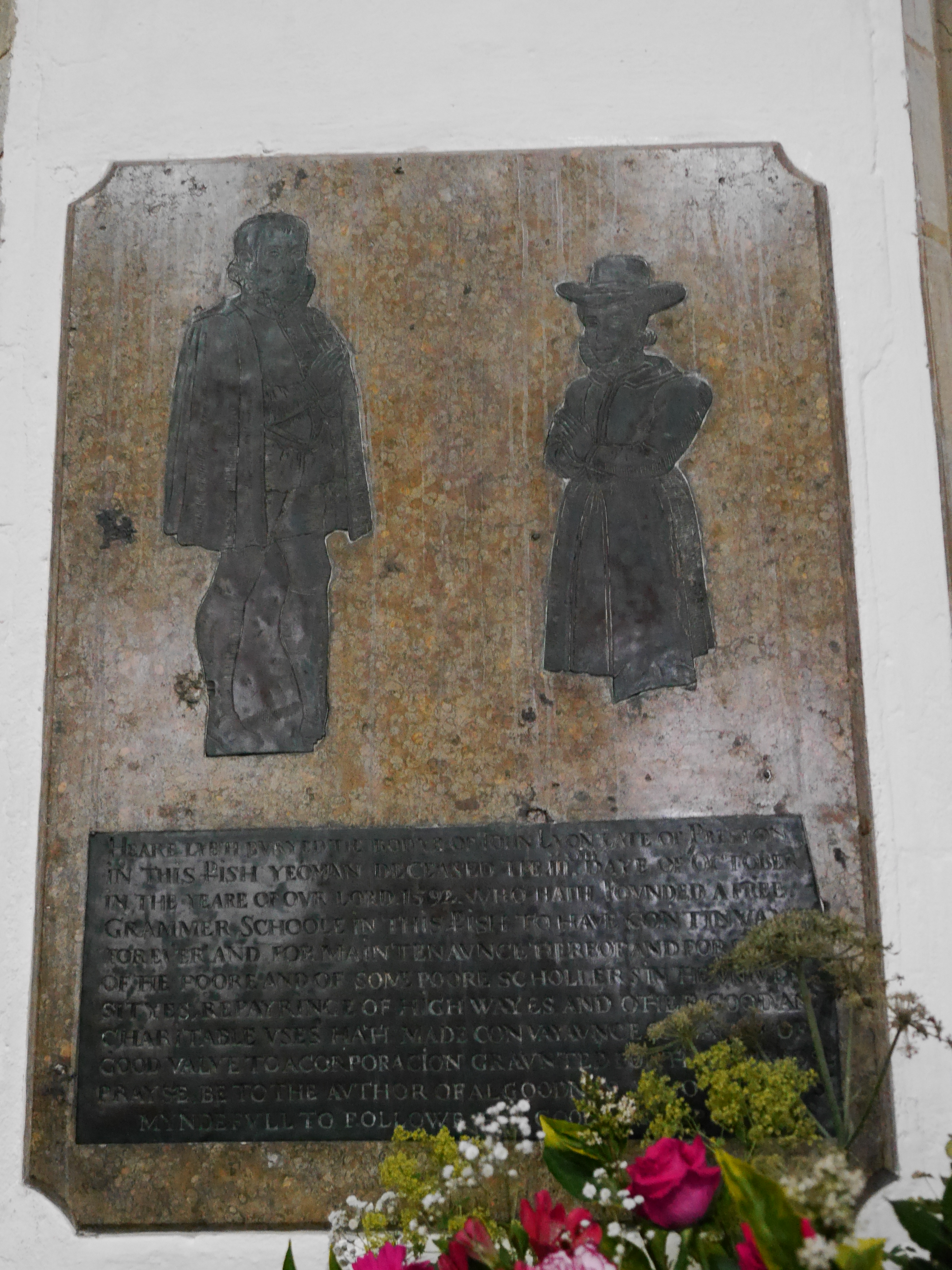
John Lyon memorial, St Mary's, Harrow on the Hill

John Lyon (c.1514 – 1592) was an English armigerous yeoman-landowner who was the founder of Harrow School and the John Lyon's Charity. The John Lyon School was named after him. The Harrow School house, Lyon's, is also named after him.

== Family ==
John Lyon, who was born c. 1514, and resided at the 15th-century Preston Hall, was a descendant of the Lyons family of Warkworth, Northamptonshire, that owned estates at Harrow-on-the-Hill. He was the son of John Lyon (b. c. 1450), who descended from another John Lyon, who in 1370 received land at Kingsbury in the parish of Edgware.

He was the first-cousin of Sir John Lyon or Lyons (1514 - 1564), who was Lord Mayor of London from 1554 to 1555, who was a member of the Worshipful Company of Grocers.

The 19th century Dictionary of National Biography identifies his mother as a woman named Joan who married his father: but some less-reliable sources identify his mother as Emma Hedde (b. c.1470).

Lyon died on 3 October 1592 without issue: and his wife died on 30 August 1608. Both were buried in St Mary's, Harrow on the Hill, where they were commemorated by a monumental brass of their effigies that had an inscription, that was removed from the floor during a restoration, and placed against a wall. However, in 1888, a marble slab with a Latin inscription was laid over his grave.

== Charities ==
John Lyon by 1564 had the largest land-rental income in Harrow, and was in 1572 the founder, with a Royal Charter, of Harrow School, and of the John Lyon's Charity. The John Lyon School was given his name by its founders who were the governors of Harrow School. A Harrow School house, Lyon's, is named after him, but the Harrow School buildings that were built after his death were built by, and named after, a different John Lyon.

Lyon established a trust for the maintenance of Harrow Road and Edgware Road, from which the income from his estate is dispensed by John Lyon's Charity to charities and state-schools in nine London boroughs: Barnet, Brent, Camden, Ealing, Hammersmith & Fulham, Kensington & Chelsea, Harrow, and the Cities of London and Westminster. Lyon's family had a lion in its coat of arms that is represented as a supporter in the contemporary coat of arms of the London Borough of Brent, and as a crest in the contemporary coat of arms of the London Borough of Harrow.

=== Foundation of Harrow School ===
Lyon spent twenty English marks every year on the education of poor children, as a consequence of which, on 13 February 1572, Queen Elizabeth I granted him a Royal Charter by Letters Patent to found a free grammar school for the education of boys at Harrow, and to incorporate his trustees as Governors of the "Free Grammar-School of John Lyon". He during 1590 stipulated statutes for his school that provided for a schoolmaster with the degree of M. A., and an usher with the degree of B. A., both to be unmarried; and that stipulated the curriculum and activities for its pupils (including top-driving, handball, running, and shooting) who were to learn the Protestant catechism and attend mass, and to be taught Greek in the two highest forms. He stipulated that the school could ‘receive so many foreigners over and above the youth of the parish as the whole number may be well taught and the place can contain'.

He also, with his wife and the Governors of his school, invested in property at Marylebone in 1571, the rents from which were used to the repair the high-road between Edgware and London, and the surplus from which were used to repair the road between Harrow and London. Subsequently, after the Clerk to the Signet proposed to raise from Lyon £50 as a loan to the state, the Attorney-General Sir Gilbert Gerard contended that Lyon ought not to be forced to sell lands that he had bought for the maintenance of his school.

== See also ==
- Lyons family
