= John Lyon (lord mayor) =

Elizabethan landowner and politician

Sir John Lyon
- Born: 1514; Middlesex
- Died: 7 September 1564 (aged 49–50); Bucklersbury, London
- Resting place: Bucklersbury, London
- Occupations: Landowner and politician
- Known for: Sheriff of London in 1550; Lord Mayor of London from October 1554 until 1555
- Parent(s): Thomas Lyons [sic] of Perivale, Middlesex (father)
- Relatives: John Lyon (d. 1592), who was the founder of Harrow School
- Family: Lyons family

Sir John Lyon (or Lyons; c. 1514–1564) was an English armigerous landowner who served as Lord Mayor of London from October 1554 until 1555.

== Family ==
He was born circa 1514 to Thomas Lyons [sic] of Perivale, Middlesex, who was a descendant of the Middlesex branch of the Lyons family of Warkworth, Northamptonshire.

His first cousin was the yeoman landowner John Lyon (died 1592), who was the founder of Harrow School, after whom The John Lyon School, and The John Lyon's Charity, and a Harrow School house, Lyon's, are named.

== Life ==
He resided at Bucklersbury, London, where he was buried at St. Styth's Church, which adjoined his house.

He was a member of the Worshipful Company of Grocers. He served as Sheriff of the City of London in 1550. He was knighted in January 1554. He served as Lord Mayor of London from October 1554 until 1555.

His first wife Alice died in 1555. His second wife was Elizabeth Lee (d. July 1569), who was the widow of Austen Hynde who had been Sheriff of London.

== Death ==
He died on the 7 September 1564 without issue. He left his estate to his nephew, of Acton, London.
