= Ingelram de Lyons =

Norman nobleman

- Born: c. 1020; Haute-Normandie, France
- Died: c. 1085
- Issue: Nicholas de Lyons of Warkworth, Northamptonshire; Ranulph de Lyons, who was the father of Ingelram de Lyons the Younger who was also called Ingelram Parcar de Lyons; William de Lyons of Norfolk
- House: Lyons family

Ingelram de Lyons the Elder, Baron of Corsham and Culington (fl. 1066) was a Norman nobleman who arrived in England with the Norman Conquest in 1066 to fight at the Battle of Hastings, after which he was granted lands in Corsham and Culington. He is listed as a companion of William the Conqueror in the Battle Abbey Roll.

His son Nicholas de Lyons (who, with his son Sir John de Lyons, emigrated from Normandy to England in 1080) was granted lands at Warkworth, Northamptonshire, by William the Conqueror.

== Origin ==
His surname is derived from that of the castle and forest of Lyons in Haute-Normandie, where he had been established as a lord for several decades prior to his emigration to England.

== Emigration to England ==
He emigrated to England with the Norman Conquest in 1066 to fight at the Battle of Hastings, after which he was granted lands in Corsham and Culington. He is listed as a companion of William the Conqueror in the Battle Abbey Roll.

== Descendants and Legacy ==
Ingelram de Lyons The Elder had at least two sons:

- Nicholas de Lyons: Nicholas probably was either a brother or son of Ingelram The Elder, whom he and his son Sir John de Lyons followed to England during 1080. They were granted lands at Warkworth, Northamptonshire by William the Conqueror and subsequently bought Warkworth Castle, Northamptonshire, which was the English seat of the Lyons family until 1412. Warkworth Castle was converted into a spectacular house by subsequent owners, during the Jacobean period, but was demolished c.1805. Nicholas's grandson, who was also named John (b. 1100), travelled to the Holy Land.
- Ranulph de Lyons: who was the father of Ingelram de Lyons the Younger, who was also called Ingelram Parcar de Lyons. Ranulph's descendants held lands in Norfolk and in Leicestershire.
- William de Lyons: William was the brother of Ranulph, and received a grant of land in Norfolk from Earl Walter Giffard.

== See also ==
- Lyons family
- Norman Conquest
