= Lyons baronets =

There have been two baronetcies created for people with the surname Lyons, both recipients being later elevated to the peerage:

- Viscount Lyons: Lyons baronets of Christchurch (1840)
- Baron Ennisdale: Lyons baronets of Grateley (1937)
