= Kilvrough Manor =

Country house near Swansea, Wales

Coordinates: 51.58471°N 4.07960°W

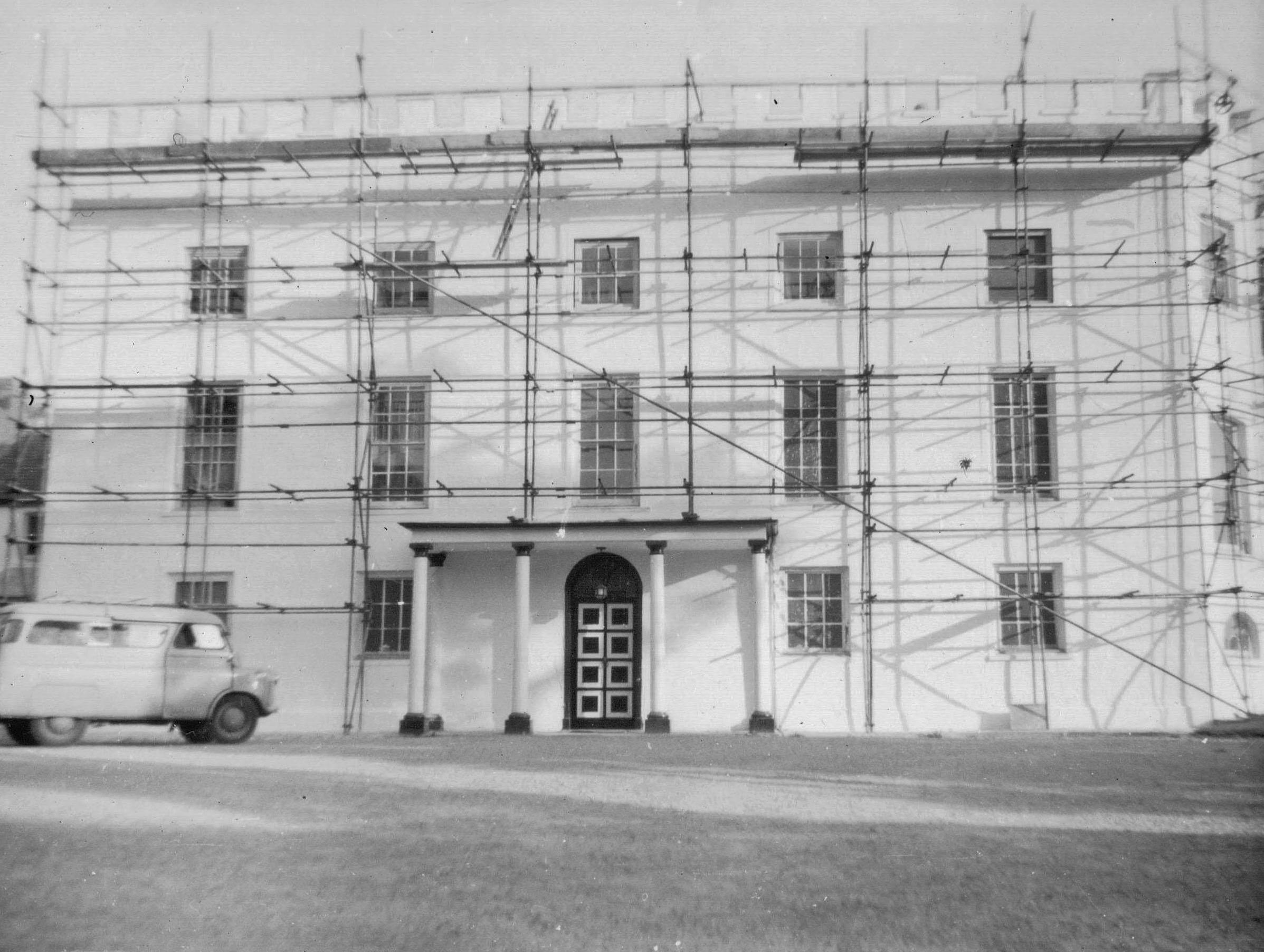
Kilvrough Manor

Kilvrough Manor is a large country house near Swansea. It is a Grade II* listed building. Its park is listed on the Cadw/ICOMOS Register of Parks and Gardens of Special Historic Interest in Wales.

== History ==
The house was built for Rowland Dawkin, a member of the Gower family, in 1585. In 1820, Major Thomas Penrice of Great Yarmouth acquired the manor: in June 1831 he was ordered by the Marquess of Bute, Lord Lieutenant of Glamorgan, to tackle civil unrest associated with the Reform Bill. To his huge embarrassment, Penrice and his Yeomanry troops were disarmed by a large mob of rioters and, following an official inquiry, the local Yeomanry unit was re-organised by the Government.

The house passed to Penrice's nephew and, through the nephew's daughter, to Admiral of the Fleet Sir Algernon Lyons who died there in 1908. Kilvrough Manor was inherited by Lyons's eldest surviving son Commander Algernon Edmund Penrice Lyons DSO (b. 1886), of Glazebrook House, South Brent, Devon, who sold it in 1920.

In the 1930s it was bought by Arthur Thomas, a Swansea businessman, and in 1949 it was bought by the Oxfordshire Education Committee. It is now an outdoor learning centre.

The park surrounding the house is listed at Grade II on the Cadw/ICOMOS Register of Parks and Gardens of Special Historic Interest in Wales.
