= Marquis de Vallado =

Marquis de Vallado is a Spanish title that was bestowed on Englishman Humphrey Walrond on 5 August 1653, by King Philip IV of Spain.

Walrond, who was born in Sea, Somerset, was Deputy Governor of Barbados until 1662, where, throughout the English interregnum, he had defeated the Parliamentarians, in 1650, and maintained a royalist regime. Along with the Marquisate he was created the Conde de Parama y Valderonda and a Grandee of the 1st Class, with his eldest son to bear the courtesy title of Conde de Parama.

The Walrond family was associated with the Lyons family, who dominated the Government of Antigua during the 18th century. The 5th Marquis de Vallado married Sarah Lyons (1731 - 1764): and their daughter Catherine Walrond married Captain John Lyons, by whom she had had 15 children, including Vice-Admiral John Lyons and Edmund Lyons, 1st Baron Lyons. Therefore, Richard Lyons, 1st Viscount Lyons, the diplomat who solved the Trent Affair, and Sir Algernon McLennan Lyons, Admiral of the Fleet, were great-grandchildren descendants of the 5th Marquis de Vallado.

The following is a list of those members of the Walrond family who inherited these Spanish honours:

== Holders of the title ==
Name	Born	Died	Spouse	Notes
Sir Humphrey Walrond			Elizabeth Napier	1st Marquis
George Walrond		1688	Frances Coryton (d. 1665)	2nd Marquis, son of the 1st
Theodore Walrond		1706	Elizabeth Smith	3rd Marquis, son of the 2nd
Theodore Walrond		1748	Elizabeth Wills	4th Marquis, son of the 3rd
Maine Swete Walrond	1725	1790	Sarah Lyons (1731 - 1764)	5th Marquis, son of the 4th
Joseph Lyons Walrond	1752	1815	Caroline Codrington (d. 1833)	Attended St John's College, Oxford. 6th Marquis, son of the 5th
Lyons Walrond	1800	1819		7th Marquis, son of the 6th
Bethell Walrond	1802	1876	Lady Janet St. Clair-Erskine (1800 - 1880), daughter of 2nd Earl of Rosslyn	8th Marquis, son of the 6th; Member of Parliament 1826-32
Henry Walrond	1841	1917	Caroline Maud Clark (d. 1915)	9th Marquis, son of the 8th
Henry Humphrey Walrond	1862	1940	Gertrude Gordon Hill (1873 - 1970)	10th Marquis, son of the 9th
Henry Ernest Walrond	1896	1972	Imogene Fletcher (1893 - 1972)	11th Marquis, nephew of the 10th

== See also ==
- Lyons family
