= Humphrey Lyons =

British Indian Army general

- Born: 8 July 1802
- Died: 25 May 1873 (aged 70)
- Military career
- Allegiance: United Kingdom
- Branch: British Indian Army
- Rank: Lieutenant-General
- Awards: Companion of the Order of the Bath

Lieutenant-General Humphrey Lyons CB (8 July 1802 – 25 May 1873) was a senior Indian Army officer.

== Life ==
Humphrey Lyons was born at St Austins, Hampshire, on 8 July 1802. He was the ninth of twelve sons of John Lyons of Antigua and St Austin's (1760–1816), by Catherine (1763–1803), who was the daughter of Maine Swete Walrond, 5th Marquis de Vallado.

His brothers included Vice-Admiral John Lyons, who fought on HMS Victory at the Battle of Trafalgar, and Admiral Edmund Lyons, 1st Baron Lyons, who led the Royal Navy to victory during the Crimean War, and through whom he was the uncle of the diplomat Richard Lyons, 1st Viscount Lyons (who was the British Ambassador to the USA who solved the Trent Affair, and who was later British Ambassador to France).

He entered the 23rd Bombay Native Infantry on 25 May 1817. He was promoted to lieutenant-general on 20 May 1871. He died on 25 May 1873.

== Family ==
Lyons married twice. In 1829, he married Elizabeth Bennett (1798–1859), by whom he had the following children:

- Augusta Catherine Lyons (1827–1828).
- Edmund Willoughby Lyons (1830–1889), Colonel in the Indian Army. He married twice and had issue.
- Sir Algernon McLennan Lyons GCB ADC DL JP (1833–1908), Admiral of the Fleet (Royal Navy).
- George Maughan Lyons (1835–1878), Major in the Indian Army.
- Henry Maine Lyons (1837–1838).
- Charlotte Salter Lyons (b. 1839). She married, in 1859, Colonel Alexander Learmonth, by whom she had issue.
- Minna Louisa Lyons (1841–1926). She married, in 1858, Jameson Alers-Hankey, by whom she had issue.

Humphrey Lyons married, secondly, on 7 July 1860, The Hon. Adelaide Matilda Yelverton (1821–1884), who was the daughter of the 3rd Viscount Avonmore, and by whom he had no issue.

== See also ==
- Lyons family
