= Bucklersbury, London =

Short street in the City of London

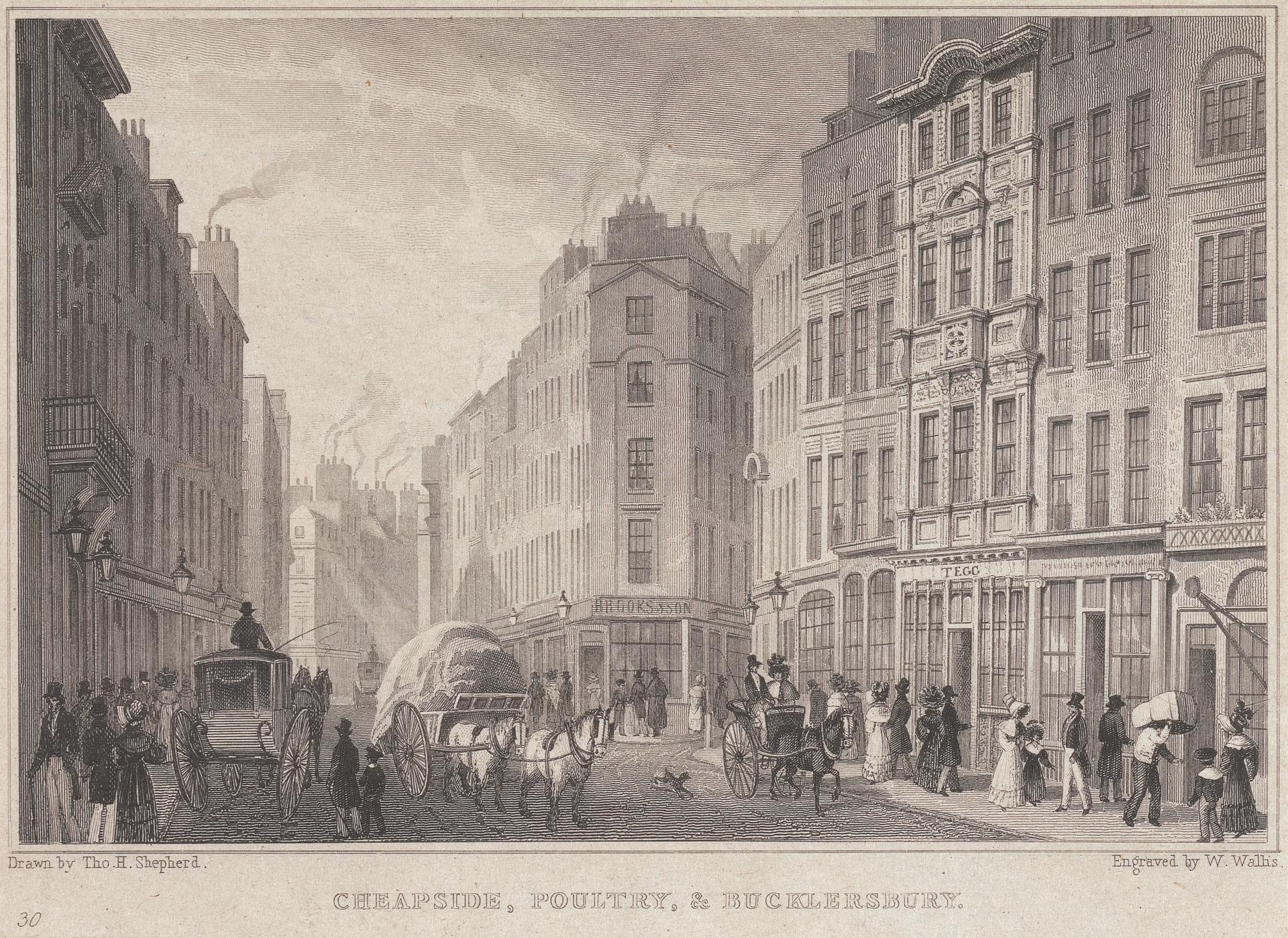
Cheapside, Poultry and Bucklersbury

Bucklersbury is an historic area in the City of London, between Poultry and Walbrook. It now consists of only a single road of 150 feet, but was much longer before the Great Fire of London.

== History ==
During the Roman era, Bucklersbury was within the fortified Londinium. A Roman mosaic dating from 200 to 250 CE was discovered near Bucklersbury in 1869 and was named the “Bucklersbury pavement” due to its location halfway between Bucklersbury and Poultry. A London Mithraeum was uncovered under the 20th-century Bucklersbury House (which was demolished in 2011) on the neighbouring street of Walbrook.

The first English record of Bucklersbury is dated to 1275, in a deed from Thomas Bukerel, who claims that the area is named after his family.

During the 15th century, the area included many apothecaries and groceries, and was mentioned for its sweet aromas by William Shakespeare in his comedy The Merry Wives of Windsor. There was a tower in Bucklersbury, called Servats tower, which was used as a wardrobe by Isabella of France and during the 16th century served as the home of Sir Thomas More.

In 1997, Bucklersbury Passage, which bisects No 1 Poultry, was built on the site of Bucklersbury's historic shops.

== Notable residents ==
- Sir Thomas More, English politician, author and philosopher.
- Sir John Lyon or Lyons, Lord Mayor of London from 1554 to 1555. He was buried at St. Styth's Church, which adjoined his house.
- Samuel Mitchell, planter in the Caribbean and interim governor of Grenada.
