= John Lyons (Royal Navy officer, born 1787) =

British Royal Navy Admiral and diplomat

Vice-Admiral John Lyons
- Born: 1 September 1787
- Died: December 1872 (aged 85); England
- Relatives: Captain John Lyons (1760 - 1816) (father); Catherine Walrond, daughter of the 5th Marquis de Vallado (mother); Admiral Edmund Lyons, 1st Baron Lyons (brother); Lieutenant-General Humphrey Lyons (brother); Richard Lyons, 1st Viscount Lyons (1817–1887) (nephew); Edmund Moubray Lyons (1819–1855) (nephew); Sir Algernon Lyons, Admiral of the Fleet (1833–1908) (nephew)
- Military career
- Allegiance: United Kingdom
- Branch: Royal Navy
- Service years: 1798–1866
- Rank: Vice-Admiral

Vice-Admiral John Lyons (1 September 1787 – December 1872) was an eminent British Admiral and Foreign Ambassador of the Royal Navy.

== Family ==
Lyons was born on 1 September 1787 and was baptized at Lyndhurst in Hampshire in 1788. He was the eldest son and third of fifteen children of Captain John Lyons of Antigua (20 October 1760 – 6 February 1816), who was a British owner of 563 acres of sugar plantations in Antigua, and whose English residence was St. Austens, Lymington, Hampshire. His mother was Catherine Walrond, who was the daughter of the 5th Marquis de Vallado and Sarah Lyons (1731–1764).

His brothers included Admiral Edmund Lyons, 1st Baron Lyons (1790–1858), who led the Royal Navy during the Crimean War, through whom his nephew was the diplomat Richard Lyons, 1st Earl Lyons; and Lieutenant-General Humphrey Lyons (1802 – 1873) of the Indian Army, through whom his nephew was Sir Algernon Lyons, Admiral of the Fleet.

== Career ==
John entered the Royal Navy on 20 September 1798 as midshipman on HMS St George, a 98-gun second-rate ship of the line commanded by Captain John Holloway that was attached to the Channel Fleet. The other captains of the ship included Sampson Edwards, Henry Nichols, and William Grenville Lobb. The ship also bore the flag of Admiral Lord Nelson and Admiral Charles Morice Pole. The ship was involved in the blockade of Toulon, and, with Captain Thomas Hardy on board, at the Battle of Copenhagen.

In April 1801, Lyons served under the flag of Admiral Sir Hyde Parker, and during the Peace of Amiens during 1801–1803, on the West India Station and the Home Station, in the 74-gun HMS Edgar and the 14-carriage-gun brig-sloop HMS Childers. Lyons also served with Captain Delafons on the 38-gun Africaine, which had been captured from the French in 1801, and with Captain Thomas Manby. In 1803, Lyons joined the 74-gun HMS Magnificent, which struck rocks off Brest on 25 March 1804 whilst blockading the French. Lyons then joined the 100-gun HMS Tonnant, which had been a French ship of the line captured at the Battle of the Nile, for three months until he joined HMS Victory, then Nelson's flagship, on which he was present at the Battle of Trafalgar on 21 October 1805. Lyons then moved to Admiral Lord Collingwood's 98-gun HMS Queen for the blockade of Cadiz, and then to the 74-gun HMS Eagle of Captain Charles Rowley, on which he was present for the taking of the island of Capri from Napoleon in May 1806. In 1807 Lyons was transferred to the 74-gun HMS Montagu, on which he was involved in the evacuation of the Messina Straits in the winter of 1807. He was involved in the assault on the Castle of Santa Maura on the Greek island of Lefkada in the Ionian Sea.

Lyons subsequently served on the 74-gun HMS Repulse and the 74-gun HMS Bombay during the blockade of Toulon until May 1813, and on the Cormorant-class ship-sloop HMS Anacreon, before he became ill and missed the ship's departure from Lisbon which ended in its loss with the loss of all crew. Lyons subsequently joined the 110-gun HMS Ville de Paris in January 1814, and was promoted to commander on 27 June 1815, as which he served at the Cape of Good Hope between 1828 and 1830 onboard HMS Jaseur, a Cruizer-class 18-gun brig-sloop involved with anti-slave operations between Mauritius and Madagascar. He was promoted to captain in 1830.

Between 1839 and 1840 Lyons was employed as an ambassador to the Ottoman states by the Egyptian Government between Cairo and Alexandria and Syria. He introduced to the Ottoman pasha and the Egyptian landmarks dignitaries who travelled between Bombay, Suez, and Britain. The overland journey to India by this passage took two months. By 1851 Lyons had retired to Hampshire in England. He was promoted to vice-admiral in 1866.

== Marriages ==
He married Caroline Bowen (b. 1789), who was the daughter of Major Bowen of the Royal Artillery, in 1810, at St. Paul's Anglican Cathedral in Malta. During the 1850s he lived at Bognor. In 1861 he was living in Surrey.

His first wife died in August 1864, and he secondly married in 1865, at Hove, Sussex, Anna Maria Ferguson, the widow of Colonel John L. Mowatt of the Bengal Horse Artillery, with whom he was living at Worthing in 1871.

He died in December 1872 when aged 85.
