= Glazebrook House, South Brent =

Building in South Brent, Devon, England

Coordinates: 50.4175°N 3.8450°W

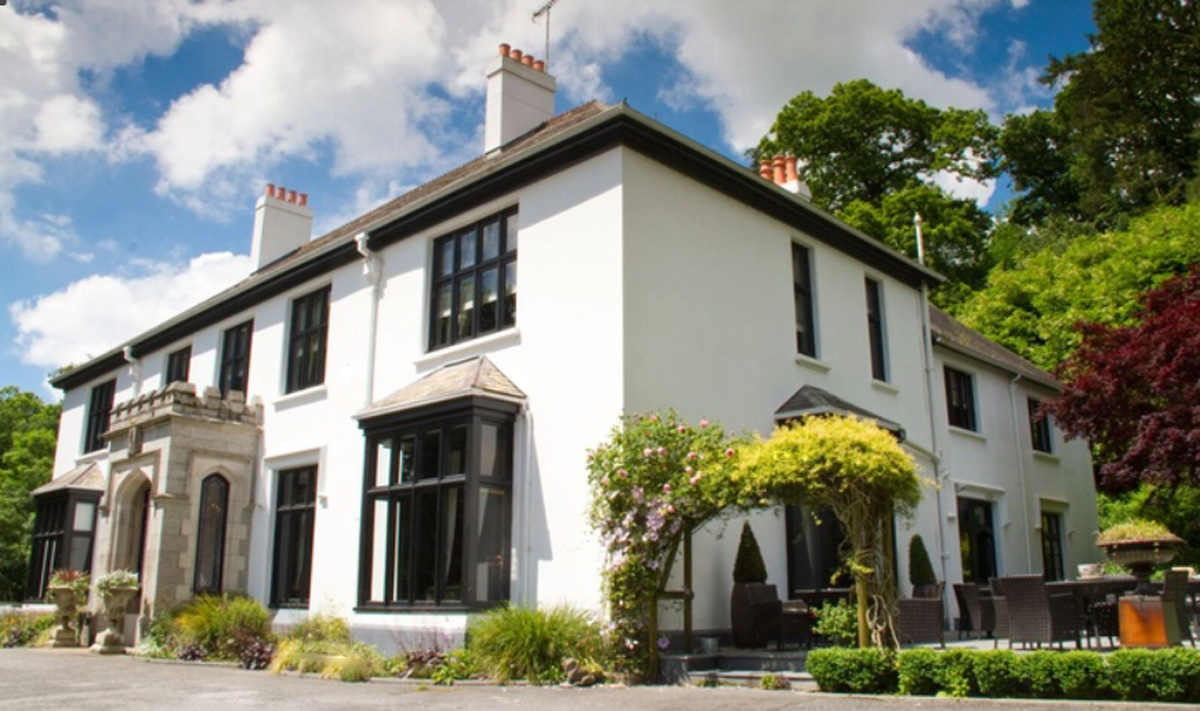
Glazebrook House

Glazebrook House is a building of historical significance in South Brent, Devon. Part of the house was built in about 1650 and was successively added to until it became the present structure. It was the residence of several notable people until 1972 when it was converted to a hotel. Today it is still a hotel which provides accommodation and restaurant facilities and caters for special events.

== Early history ==
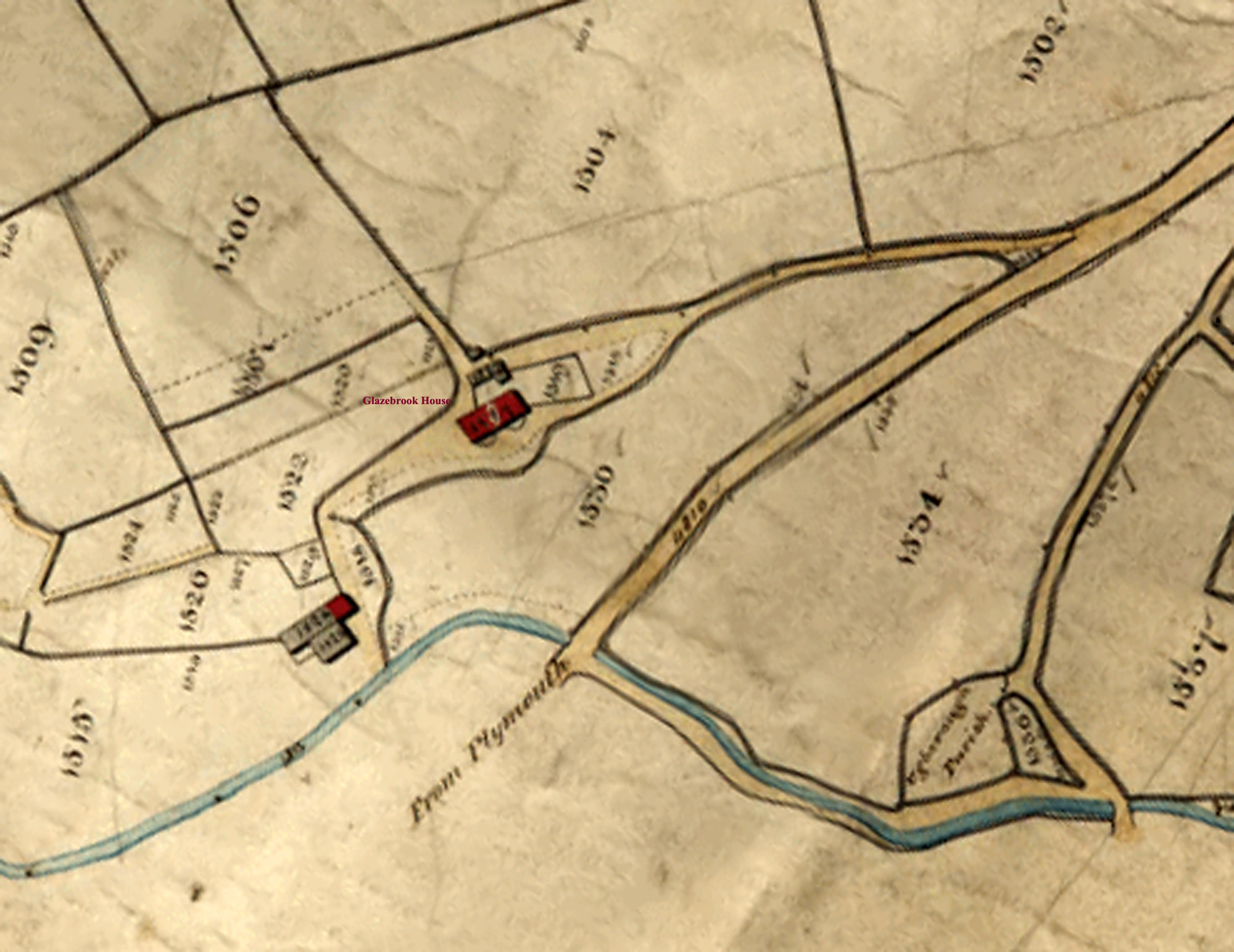
Map of Glazebrook House in about 1840

In 1650, a farmhouse was built on the site now occupied by the hotel, part of which still encompasses 3 existing rooms within the hotel (the vestibule plus the rooms on either side – the tasting room and the library).

It seems that the first major addition to the house was in the early 1800s by William Lee (1768-1837) who was the Mayor of Exeter. There is a rental advertisement for Glazebrook House in 1821 describing it as a “hunting seat or a residence for a genteel family”. Then in 1833 a full description of the property is given. It says.

"The house consists of an entrance lobby, dining room 16 feet by 18 feet, drawing room 18 feet by 22 feet, kitchen and offices, 4 bed rooms and 3 servants rooms. Detached stabling for 5 horses, a coach house and an enclosed court."

William Lee was a wealthy property owner who also owned Haccombe House near Exeter. In 1811 he became the Mayor of Exeter and for many years he was the magistrate. He usually lived in Exeter and rented Glazebrook House to wealthy tenants. One of these was John Digby Fowell who in 1819 when he was a resident married Sarah Cumming.

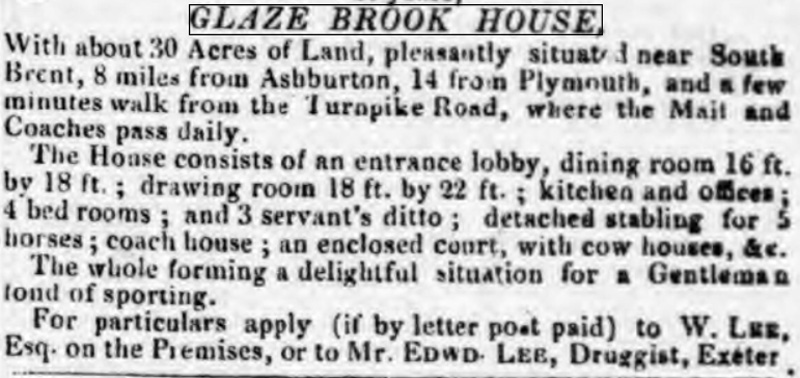
Rental notice for Glazebrook House 1833

William Lee died in 1837 and the property was sold to John Lowe, a landed proprietor and Captain in 3rd Lancashire Militia. He died in 1843 and the house passed to his only son Stanley Lowe. He sold it to Henry Kingwell of Great Ash in South Brent in about 1855. Kingwell advertised it as a rental property in 1856.

== Later residents ==
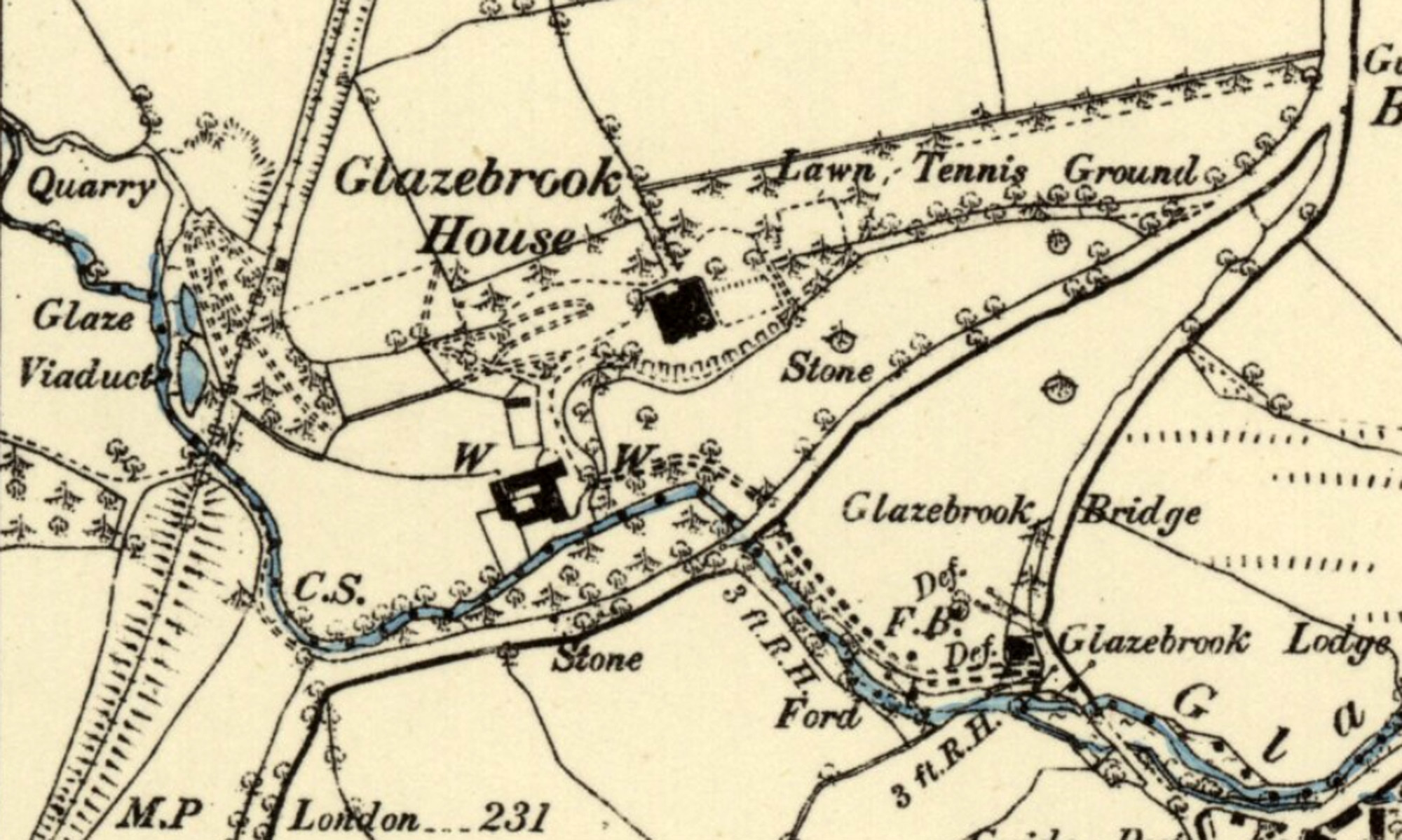
Map of Glazebrook House in 1886 after the additions had been made

During the 1870s the house was sold to Gage John Hodge (1837-1892). Hodge was born in 1837 in Pennycross. His father was William Chapell Hodge a very wealthy banker. Gage also was a partner in the banking firm Hodge and Co. which later became Barclays Bank. In 1867 he married Caroline Charlotte Coker who was the daughter of Louis Coker of Bicester House in Oxford. In 1875 his father died and left him a large inheritance. The couple had one son and two daughters. In 1892 Gage died and left Glazebrook House to his wife Caroline. She remarried in 1894 Major Richard Hall Green (1850-1913) of Aston Hall, Aston on Clun. The couple lived at Glazebrook House until his death in 1913. She remained there for several years and then the Cholmondeley family became the residents.

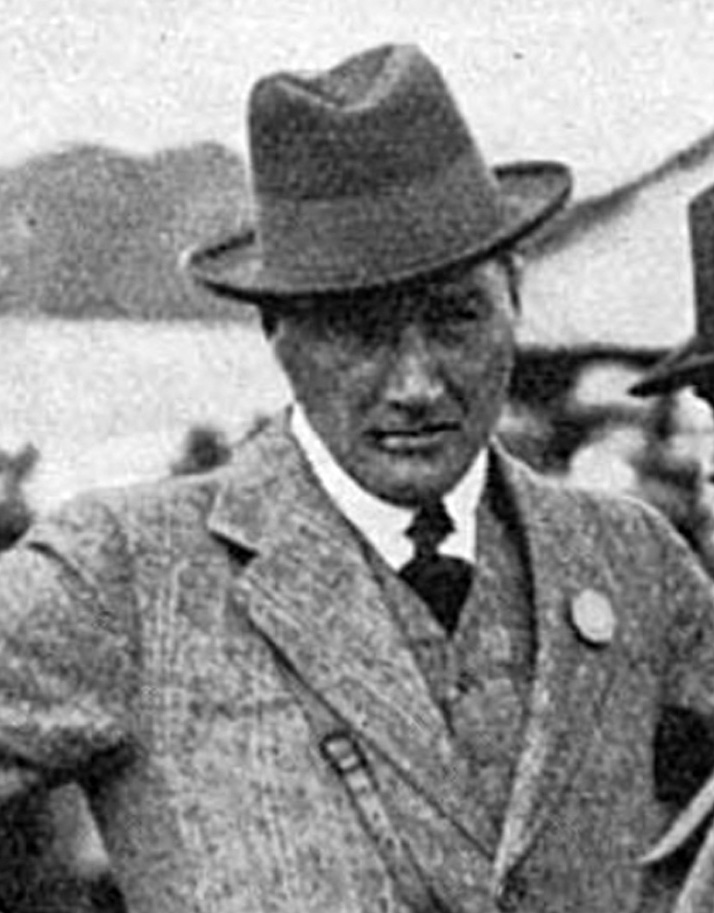
Squire Hubert Brunskill

George Vere Hugh Cholmondeley was born in 1871. He was the son of Lord Henry Vere Cholmondeley. He was a very wealthy man and owned numerous estates in Cheshire. After he died in 1925 the Brunskill family became the owners.

Hubert Fawcett Brunskill (1873-1951) was born in 1873. His father was William Fawcett Brunskill who owned Buckland Tout Saints in Devon. His mother was Annie Elliot, daughter of Samuel Elliot of Mount Galpine, Devon. His father William died in 1875 when he was only two years old and his mother Annie remarried. Her new spouse was Edward Irwin of Derrygore in Ireland. Unfortunately he died two years later in 1880 and she returned with her young children to live at Buckland-Tout-Saints. In 1896 Hubert married Hilda Turner, daughter of William Barrow Turner of Ponsonby Hall, Cumberland. He inherited Buckland-Tout-Saints when he came of age and he and Hilda lived there for many years. The couple had one son and one daughter. In about 1920 due to financial difficulties they decided to sell Buckland Tout Saints. They then lived in Porlock for some time and later bought Glazebrook House.

Hilda died in 1940 and in 1945 the house was advertised for sale. It was owned by Commander Algernon Edmund Penrice Lyons (b. 1886) from 1945 to 1970, after which it was converted into a hotel. He was the eldest surviving son of Sir Algernon McLennan Lyons, Admiral of the Fleet.
