= John Lyons (Antiguan landowner) =

Captain Major John Lyons JP DL (20 October 1760 – 6 February 1816) was an Antiguan politician of English ethnicity, and a Captain in the Royal Navy and Major in the British Army, who owned 563 acres of sugar plantations in Antigua.

He was the progenitor of a famous naval family. He married Catherine Walrond, who was the daughter of the 5th Marquis de Vallado and Sarah Lyons (1731-1764), by whom he had 15 children, including Vice-Admiral John Lyons, who fought on HMS Victory at Battle of Trafalgar, and Admiral Edmund Lyons, 1st Baron Lyons, who led the Royal Navy during the Crimean War.

His grandsons included Richard Lyons, 1st Viscount Lyons, the leading British diplomat of the second half of the 20th century, who solved the Trent Affair, and Sir Algernon McLennan Lyons, Admiral of the Fleet.

== Life ==
=== Family ===
John was born in Antigua on 20 October 1760. He was the eldest of 11 children. His father was John Lyons (1731 - 1775), who had succeeded to the 563 acre Lyons estate in Antigua in 1748 and had served as a member of the Council of Antigua from 1764 to 1775. In addition to his father, his grandfather and great-grandfather also had been members of the Council. John's great-grandfather Major Henry Lyons had emigrated to Antigua from River Lyons, King's County, Ireland, and Ledestown/Ledistown Hall, County Westmeath, Ireland.

The Irish Protestant Lyons family were not ethnically Irish, but English members of the Protestant Ascendancy who had been granted land in Ireland by James I. The grandson of Sir Richard Lyons, who was Governor of Calais during the reign of Henry VIII, was Captain William Lyons, a Huguenot and supporter of Henry of Navarre, and who fled to England, after the Massacre of St. Bartholomew in 1572, and entered the army of Elizabeth I, in which, in 1599, he commanded a company of cavalry, under the Earl of Essex, in the Tudor conquest of Ireland. Captain William was consequently granted the estate of Clonarrow, subsequently known as River Lyons, in King's County, the transfer of which to Lyons occurred in 1622, after which his family settled in Ireland. William also bought the lands of Mullalough, Casement, Killeen, and Killowen, together constituting over 3000 acres, in the same County.

John's mother was Jane Harman (1733 - 1792): who was the daughter of Colonel Samuel Harman who was elected as a Member of Assembly for Nonsuch in 1727 and later as a Member of Council and Judge of the Court of Common Pleas.

=== Life ===
John Lyons succeeded to the 563 acre Lyons sugar estate in Antigua which had been, successively, owned by his great-grandfather, grandfather, and father. He was sworn in as a member of the Council of Antigua in 1782. After the death of their second child, in 1803, John and his wife, Catherine, returned to England and settled at St Austin's, a 190 acre estate in the New Forest, Lymington, Hampshire. He held the rank of Major in the Christchurch Loyal Volunteer Artillery. He died 6 February 1816 in England. A memorial inscription to him exists at Boldre, near Lymington.

== Family ==
Lyons in 1784 married Catherine Walrond, who was the third daughter of Maine Swete Walrond, 5th Marquis de Vallado, of Mountrath, Devon, and Sarah Lyons (1731 - 1764), who was the daughter of William Lyons of Antigua and Philadelphia.

John and Catherine had 15 children: five of the sons entered the East India Company, one entered the British Army, and three entered the Royal Navy. After Catherine's death in 1803, John married Elizabeth Robbins (26 November 1767 – 18 October 1820), who was daughter of William Robbins of Salisbury, Wiltshire, on 17 March 1804.

The following are those children by John's first marriage to Catherine Walrond:

- Jane Lyons (1785 - 1803).
- Eliza Lyons (1786 - 1786).
- Vice-Admiral John Lyons (1787 - 1872) of Bognor. Fought on HMS Victory at Battle of Trafalgar and served as British Ambassador in Egypt. He married, firstly, Caroline Bowen, and, secondly, Anna Maria Ferguson.
- Theodore Lyons (1788 - 1825, East Indies).
- Lieutenant Henry Lyons, (1789 - 1807, killed in action at Copenhagen).
- Admiral Edmund Lyons, 1st Baron Lyons, (1790 - 1858). Father of Richard Lyons, 1st Viscount Lyons, the leading British diplomat of the second half of the 20th century, who was British Ambassador to USA during the American Civil War, and subsequently British Ambassador to France; and of Captain Edmund Moubray Lyons of the Royal Navy.
- Anne Lyons (1792 - 1816).
- Catherine Lyons (1794 - 1857). Artist. She married Edmund Walcott, of Winkton House near Burton, who was Colonel Commandant of the Christchurch Loyal Volunteer Artillery.
- William Lyons (1795 -1795).
- George Rose Lyons (1796 - 1828). Member of the East India Company.
- William Mills Lyons (1797 - 1881). Royal Artillery. He married Mary Ann Adams.
- Lieutenant Maine Walrond Lyons (1798 - 1827). He was killed at the Battle of Navarino.
- Caroline Lyons (1800 - 1879). She married in 1820 Henry Shepherd Pearson, Governor of Penang (d. 1840), by whom she was the mother of Richard Lyons Otway Pearson, Assistant Commissioner of the Metropolitan Police.
- Lieutenant-General Humphrey Lyons (1802 - 1873). Indian (Bombay) Army. He married Adelaide Matilda, who was the daughter of 3rd Viscount Avonmore, and was the father of Sir Algernon McLennan Lyons, Admiral of the Fleet.
- Charles Bethel Lyons (1803 - 1864). He married, in 1826, Mrs. Susannah Elizabeth Sockett (d. 1847), and, secondly, in 1848, Henrietta Moore (d. 1880).

The following are the children of John by his second wife Elizabeth:

- Lieutenant-Colonel Samuel Athill Lyons (1805 - 1881). Indian (Bengal) Army. He married Sophia (d. 1840), who was the daughter of Colonel Logie, and, secondly, in 1842, Mary Wall (d. 1893).
- Frances Walrond Lyons (1806 - 1884).
- Captain Edward Robbins Lyons (1807 - 1849). Indian Army.

== See also ==
- Lyons family
