= Edmund Lyons, 1st Baron Lyons =

19th-century Royal Navy Admiral and British diplomat

Admiral The Right Honourable The Lord Lyons GCB GCMG KCH
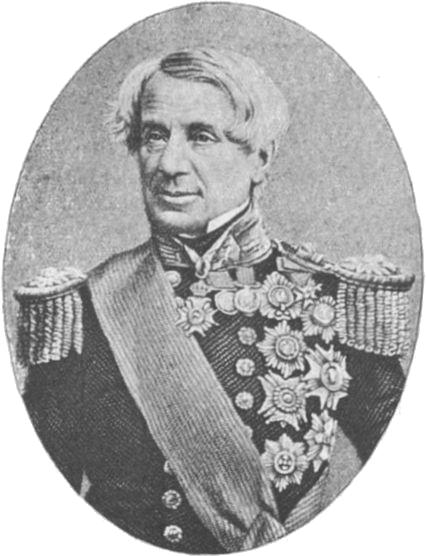
- Born: 21 November 1790; Burton, Hampshire, England, Great Britain
- Died: 23 November 1858 (aged 68); Arundel Castle, United Kingdom
- Burial place: Arundel Castle
- Education: Hyde Abbey School
- Relatives: Captain John Lyons of Antigua (father); Vice-Admiral John Lyons (1787–1872) (brother); Anne Theresa Bickerton Lyons, Baroness von Wurtzburg (1815–1894) (daughter); Richard Lyons, 1st Viscount Lyons (1817–1887) (son); Edmund Moubray Lyons (1819–1855) (son); Augusta Mary Minna Catherine Lyons, 14th Duchess of Norfolk (1821–1886) (daughter); Admiral of the Fleet Sir Algernon McLennan Lyons (1833–1908) (nephew); Philip Kerr, 11th Marquess of Lothian (great-grandson)
- Military career
- Allegiance: United Kingdom
- Branch: Royal Navy
- Service years: 1803–1858
- Rank: Admiral
- Commands: HMS Rinaldo; HMS Blonde; HMS Madagascar; Mediterranean Fleet
- Conflicts: Napoleonic Wars; Invasion of the Spice Islands; Invasion of Java; Crimean War; Siege of Taganrog; Siege of Sevastopol; Battle of Kinburn
- Awards: 1828 – Knight of the Order of Saint Louis (France); 1833 – Knight Grand Cross of the Order of the Redeemer (Greece); 1835 – Knight Commander of the Royal Guelphic Order (House of Guelph); 1840 – Baronet (United Kingdom); 1844 – Knight Grand Cross of the Civil Division of the Order of the Bath (United Kingdom); 1855 – Knight Grand Cross of the Military Division of the Order of the Bath (United Kingdom); Knight Grand Cross of the Order of St Michael and St George (United Kingdom); 1855 – Knight Grand Cross of the Order of the Medjidie, 1st Class (Ottoman Empire); Knight Grand Cross of the Legion of Honour (France); 1856 – Knight Grand Cross of the Military Order of Savoy (Italy); 1856 – Baron (United Kingdom)

Admiral Edmund Lyons, 1st Baron Lyons (known for most of his career as Sir Edmund Lyons) GCB, GCMG, KCH (21 November 1790 – 23 November 1858) was a British Admiral of the Royal Navy, and diplomat in Europe, who ensured Britain's victory in the Crimean War, during which he was Commander-in-Chief of the Mediterranean Fleet, by his contribution at the Siege of Sevastopol (1854–1855) with both the Royal Navy and the British Army.

He was described by Algernon Percy, 4th Duke of Northumberland, as 'the best man that can command the British fleet', and by his obituarist as 'the ruling spirit of the Navy' and 'as brave and good a man as ever an English sun smiled on'.

His biographers have characterised him by his 'intelligence and great ability', 'vigilance and practical skill', 'inimitable' ability in 'graphic description', and 'lion heart and ready hand'.

He was the first person to attain the rank of Knight Grand Cross in both the military division and the civil division of the Order of the Bath.

He was a younger brother of Vice-Admiral John Lyons (who fought on HMS Victory at the Battle of Trafalgar and served as British Ambassador to Egypt); and the father of the diplomat Richard Lyons, 1st Viscount Lyons (who was the British Ambassador to the USA who solved the Trent Affair, and later British Ambassador to France); and the uncle of Admiral of the Fleet Sir Algernon Lyons.

== Family ==
Edmund Lyons was born at Whitehayes House, Burton, near Christchurch, on 21 November 1790. He was the fourth son of Captain John Lyons of Antigua, an owner of 563 acres of sugar plantations in Antigua, whose British residence was at St. Austen's, Lymington, Hampshire, and Catherine (née Walrond), daughter of Maine Swete Walrond, 5th Marquis de Vallado. His godparents were Sir Richard Hussey Bickerton and Lady Bickerton.

His brothers included Vice-Admiral John Lyons (1787–1872), who fought on HMS Victory at the Battle of Trafalgar and who served as British Ambassador in Egypt; Lieutenant Maine Walrond Lyons (1798 - 1827), who was killed at the Battle of Navarino; and Lieutenant-General Humphrey Lyons (1802–1873) of the Indian Army.

His nephews included Admiral of the Fleet Sir Algernon Lyons (1833–1908).

== Naval and diplomatic service ==
Lyons first went to sea on board HMS Terrible in 1798, when he was eight years old. He then returned to England to attend Hyde Abbey School near Winchester for three years. He served under Sir Harry Burrard Neale on the Royal Charlotte yacht in 1801; under R. H. Moubray on the Maidstone in 1802; and, as midshipman, under Sir John Duckworth on HMS Active in the Mediterranean Station from August 1803 until 1807, during which he participated in the demolition of a redoubt at Point Pesquies.

He served under E. D. King on the Monmouth in the East Indies in 1807; under Admiral Drury the Russell in 1809; under H. Hart on the Caroline in 1809; and under Well and W. F. Owen on the Barracouta in 1809, during which he was commissioned on 22 November 1809 and involved in the capture, from the Dutch, of Banda Neira in the Moluccas, on 9 August 1810, during the Invasion of the Spice Islands, for which he was mentioned for gallantry and promoted. Lyons then served as a flag-lieutenant, to Rear-Admiral Drury, on HMS Minden (74 guns). Lyons was involved in the assault on Fort Belgica.

=== Lyons destroys Fort Marrack ===
In 1811, a planned British attack on the fortified port of Fort Marrack, in the Sunda Strait of Batavia, Dutch East Indies, was postponed after the Royal Navy received intelligence that Dutch reinforcements had arrived. Lyons, with only 34 men, nevertheless attacked the fort and destroyed its 180-man garrison and its 54 guns.

Lyons on 25 July was dispatched to land Dutch prisoners on the island. On his return journey, on 30 July, he launched a surprise midnight attack on the Dutch fort with the 34 men who accompanied him. They stormed and captured the Dutch battery, and dispersed its Dutch garrison of 180 men and two boat-crews, and gunned down the Dutch reinforcements as they arrived, and then dismantled the fort and destroyed its 54 guns with dynamite so that they could not be used on the British Fleet.

This action was praised by the Royal Navy as 'the most outstanding example of individual bravery in the wars which followed the French Revolution'. Lyons's Commander-in-Chief, Commodore Broughton, acknowledged Lyons's 'gallantry and zeal' but criticised Lyons because 'the attack was made contrary to orders'. but Lyons was nevertheless for this action mentioned in dispatches and proposed for early promotion to the rank of Commander, which he received on 21 March 1812.

=== Marriage and issue ===
After his attack on Marrack, Lyons's health deteriorated and he returned to Britain. In 1814, he was promoted post-captain and commanded the sloop HMS Rinaldo in the fleet that escorted the French King Louis XVIII and other allied sovereigns from England to France. On 18 July 1814, at Southwick, Hampshire, he married Augusta Louisa (1792–1852), daughter of Captain Josias Rogers of the Royal Navy. He and his wife had two sons and two daughters:

1. Anne Theresa Bickerton Lyons (1815–1894), who married Philip Hartmann Veit von Würtzburg, Baron von Würtzburg, in Bavaria, in 1839.
1. Richard Lyons, 1st Earl Lyons (1817–1887). The leading British diplomat of the second half of the 20th century, who served as British Ambassador to the USA, as which he solved the Trent affair, and as British Ambassador to France. He founded the Lyons School of Diplomacy. He was a favourite of Queen Victoria who stated that she would allow him to represent her 'at any court in the world'.
1. Edmund Moubray Lyons (1819–1855). Captain in the Royal Navy, of HMS Miranda, who on 17 June 1855 was killed in action during the Crimean War in a night attack on Fort Constantine, in which he was fatally wounded by a piece of shell that embedded itself in his left leg.
1. Augusta Mary Minna Catherine Lyons (1821–1886), who married, in, 1839, Henry Granville Fitzalan-Howard, 14th Duke of Norfolk, and whose grandson was Philip Kerr, 11th Marquess of Lothian.

=== Early Mediterranean service ===
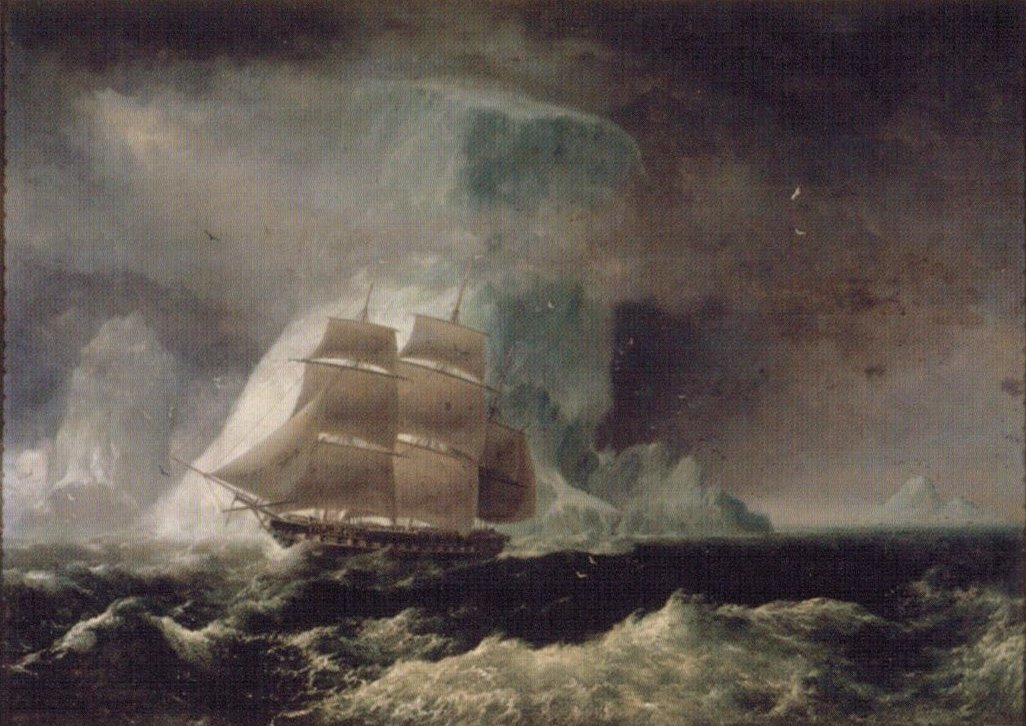
Lyons's flagship from 1828 to 1831, HMS Blonde

Lieutenant Maine Walrond Lyons (1798 - 1827), one of Edmund's younger brothers, was killed at the Battle of Navarino in 1827. The Duke of Clarence, who was the heir presumptive to the British throne, subsequently appointed Edmund, in 1828, to command the 46-gun frigate HMS Blonde during the end of the Greek War of Independence.

Lyons arrived on Malta on 20 May 1828, when Sir Richard Hussey Bickerton and Admiral Saumarez described him, in letters to their Fleet Commander, as 'a man of intelligence and great ability'. Lyons and his wife rented the most expensive house in Valletta, where they home-schooled their four children in grammar and in Enlightenment philosophy.

On HMS Blonde, Lyons was involved in the capture of Kastro Morea in the Peloponnese, for which he was knighted in both France and Greece. The following year, Lyons took the Blonde to become the first British warship to visit Sevastopol, the Caucasus, and Odessa: as a consequence of which 25 years later, Lyons was the only senior officer involved in the Crimean War who had direct knowledge of the Black Sea. In 1831 Lyons was appointed to command of the frigate HMS Madagascar, which he brought home to England before he sailed it for the Mediterranean in February 1832.

=== Diplomat at Athens, Switzerland, and Sweden ===
In August 1832, Lyons transported the new King Otto of Greece, and the Bavarian Regency, from Brindisi to Nauplia, and then, in 1833, from Trieste to Athens. Lyons left the navy in January 1835, was knighted in the Royal Guelphic Order, and was appointed by Lord Palmerston as the British diplomat at Athens, as which he remained for almost fifteen years, during which he was on 29 July 1840 created baronet, and in July 1844 he was made a Knight Grand Cross in the Civil Division of the Order of the Bath.

In 1849 Lyons was appointed Minister Plenipotentiary to the Confederated States of the Swiss Cantons and was on 14 January 1850 promoted to Rear-Admiral of the Blue in the Royal Navy, and was in 1851 appointed minister at Stockholm, at which his wife died.

=== Second-in-command of Mediterranean Fleet ===
In November 1853, with the advocacy of Sir James Graham, Lyons returned to active service in the Royal Navy, and was appointed second in command of the British Mediterranean Fleet, and was granted a pension of £900 per annum for his diplomatic service. Lyons left England for the Dardanelles, as Rear-Admiral of the White, on board the steam frigate HMS Terrible on 5 November 1853, before he then took command of his flagship, the new screw-steam ship-of-the-line HMS Agamemnon (1852) (91 guns).

== Crimean War: maverick nature and private correspondences ==
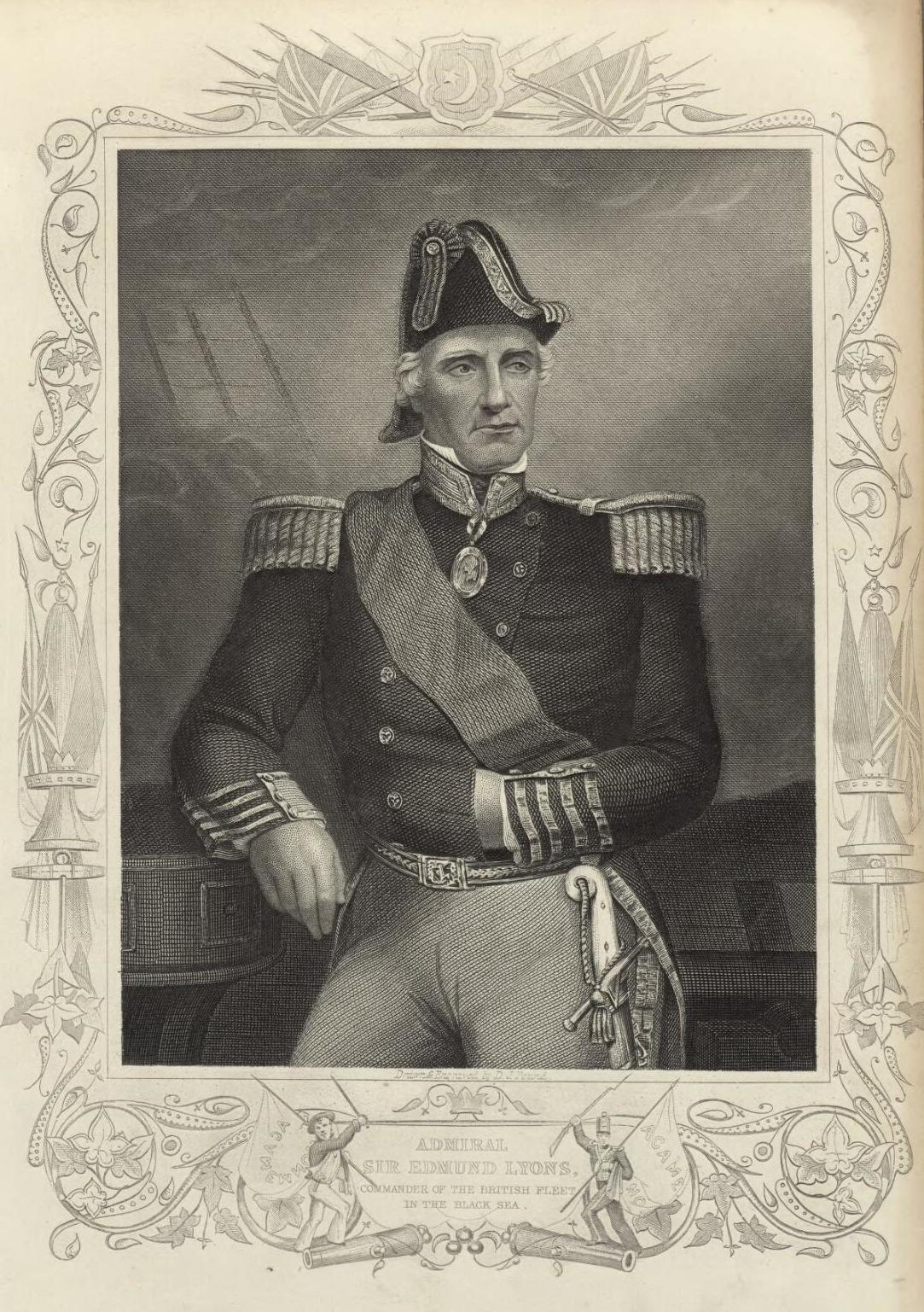
Portrait of Admiral Sir Edmund Lyons

=== Sir James Graham ===
Lyons maintained secret private correspondence with the First Lord of the Admiralty, Sir James Graham, whose plans for an amphibious assault on Sevastopol Lyons advocated at the Allied Counsels of War between July and August 1854, against the policy of his immediate superior, Vice-Admiral Sir James Dundas.

Lyons also maintained direct private correspondences with various Cabinet ministers, and published memos to the British public, in The Times newspaper, through its reporters such as John Delane, and Austen Henry Layard, and William Howard Russell, in which he criticised the policies of Admiral Dundas, who disliked Lyons's wilful independence. However, Dundas's superiors within the Navy preferred Lyons, whom they considered to be the more competent and the more charismatic, and encouraged Lyons's independence, by private correspondence and plans, such as those for the assault on Sevastopol, of which officers between Sir James Graham and Lyons in rank, such as Dundas, were not aware.

Both the English Fleet and the French Fleet zealously commended Lyons's 'skill and boldness' during the Crimean War. Lyons's white-blonde hair became identified with his maverick temerity. Lyons's hair was similar to the hair of Nelson, whom Lyons idolized. However, Lyons did not possess the strategic intelligence of Nelson and attained his victories, such as the destruction of Fort Marrack (see above) and the attack on Sevastopol (see below), by temerity rather than by meticulous planning. Lyons disliked paperwork: when Admiral Dundas ordered him to organize transports for the invasion of the Crimea, Lyons immediately employed a subordinate, his flag captain William Mends, to do it for him.

=== Lord Raglan and the army ===
Furthermore, Lyons's charisma made him a favourite of the Army General Lord Raglan, with whom he maintained another private correspondence. The friendship between Lyons and Raglan was productive of an inter-service rapport during the Crimean War and Lyons served as an intermediary between the Navy and the Army. When Lyons captured Balaklava, he advised Raglan to adopt it as the base for the British Army: Raglan did so. However, this was a poor decision because it compelled the army to suffer the Crimean winter.

Although he was a Naval officer, Lyons led a force during the diversionary attack on Sevastopol on 17 October 1854. Idiosyncratically, Lyons ignored Admiral Dundas's orders to remain disengaged and proceeded to attack on his own initiative: on this occasion, however, Lyons's attack was unsuccessful and the ships were damaged and heavy casualties sustained. However, although the attack failed, Lyons was praised for his bravery by the High Command. Lyons conceded that he was responsible for the failure, but the High Command blamed Dundas for the failure, dismissed Dundas, and, in January 1855, made Lyons Commander-in-Chief.

Lyons continued to work productively with Raglan to improve supply arrangements in the Bosphorus and at Balaklava. Lyons secured another diplomatic triumph when he secured, in May 1855, French consent to capture of Kerch and occupation of the Sea of Azov: this operation destroyed the logistic support of the Russian army in the Crimea and enabled the allied victory.

=== Later Crimean War ===
In June 1855, Lyons lost both his own son, Edmund, a captain in the Royal Navy, who had been wounded in a night attack on Sevastopol, and his friend and colleague Lord Raglan. Lyons after the defeat of Sevastopol led a successful expedition, which was the first military action to involve armoured warships, to capture Kinburn on 17 October 1855, which enabled access to the Bug and Dnieper rivers. In July 1855, Lyons, who had already received the honour of Knight Grand Cross of the Civil Division of the Order of the Bath, received the honour of Knight Grand Cross of the Military Division of the same order. He was the first person to attain the rank of Knight Grand Cross in both the military division and the civil division of the Order of the Bath.

Lyons received the thanks of both Houses of Parliament on 15 December 1854. He attended the January 1856 allied Council of War at Paris, and subsequent to the Treaty of Paris he relinquished his post of Commander in Chief of the Royal Navy in the Mediterranean, for which a banquet was subsequently hosted for him at the Mansion House, London on 13 February 1856 and he was awarded the Freedom of the City of London on 29 May 1856. He received a DCL degree from the University of Oxford on 4 June 1856.

Lyons's contribution to the Crimean War was imperative to the allied success. He transported the British Army to the Crimea and he ensured its supplies and support by the military on land, where he led assaults, including the Kerch operation, and where his friendship with Lord Raglan enabled the coordination of the Royal Navy with the British Army and Navy.

== Peerage and death ==
Edmund Lyons was created a Baron, of Christchurch, on 23 June 1856. He entered the House of Lords between Admiral George Byron, 7th Baron Byron, and Thomas Foley, 4th Baron Foley. He was promoted to Vice-Admiral on 19 March 1857 and held the temporary rank of Admiral from December 1857 until his death. He escorted Queen Victoria to Cherbourg in August 1858. During his last years he suffered from trigeminal neuralgia and atrophy. Lyons died, on 23 November 1858, at Arundel Castle, which was the seat of his son-in-law, Henry Granville Fitzalan-Howard, 14th Duke of Norfolk, where he is interred in the vault beneath the Fitzalan Chapel. Six days before his death he received holy communion.

There is a to-scale statue of him, by Matthew Noble, in St Paul's Cathedral, which remains there. The Edmund River and Lyons River in Australia are named after him.

== Reputation ==
Lyons was the first person to attain the rank of Knight Grand Cross in both the military division and the civil division of the Order of the Bath. His 'intelligence and great ability' and 'bravery, spirit, and commitment' earned him the favour both of officers and of rank-and-file, and he was described as 'as lavish with his praise of others as he was anxious to be praised by his superiors'. His detailed obituary in The Liverpool Mail described him as 'affable, playful, and full of quiet humour', as characterised by 'frankness and urbanity', as possessing 'inimitable' ability in 'graphic description', as possessing 'vigilance and practical skill' with which he was 'prompt in expedients', and as possessing 'the lion heart and ready hand'.

His obituary concludes with a quotation from Shakespeare's Henry IV, Part 1: 'I do not think a braver gentleman,/More active valiant or more valiant young,/More daring or more bold is now alive,/To grace this latter age with noble deeds'.

He was described by Algernon Percy, 4th Duke of Northumberland as 'the best man that can command the British fleet', and by his obiturarist as 'the ruling spirit of the Navy' and 'as brave and good a man as ever an English sun smiled on'. However, he was described by George Villiers, 4th Earl of Clarendon as 'irritable and one of the vainest men I ever knew'.

== Honours ==
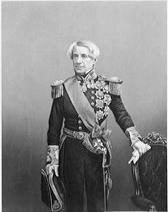
Edmund Lyons

Lyons received the following honours:

- 1828 – Knight of the Order of Saint Louis (France)
- 1833 – Knight Grand Cross of the Order of the Redeemer (Greece)
- 1835 – Knight Commander of the Royal Guelphic Order (House of Guelph)
- 1840 – Baronet (United Kingdom)
- 1844 – Knight Grand Cross of the Civil Division of the Order of the Bath (United Kingdom)
- 1854 - Thanks of both Houses of Parliament
- 1855 – Knight Grand Cross of the Military Division of the Order of the Bath (United Kingdom)
- Knight Grand Cross of the Order of St Michael and St George (United Kingdom)
- 1855 – Knight Grand Cross of the Order of the Medjidie, 1st Class (Ottoman Empire)
- 1855/6 – Knight Grand Cross of the Legion of Honour (France)
- 1856 – Freedom of the City of London
- 1856 - DCL from the University of Oxford
- 1856 – Knight Grand Cross of the Military Order of Savoy (Italy)
- 1856 – Raised to the Peerage of United Kingdom as Baron Lyons, of Christchurch, Hampshire, (United Kingdom).

== See also ==
- Lyons family

Diplomatic posts
Preceded by Henry Wellesley, 1st Baron Cowley	Minister Plenipotentiary to the Swiss Confederation; 1849–1851	Succeeded by Arthur Charles Magenis
Military offices
Preceded by Sir James Dundas	Commander-in-Chief, Mediterranean Fleet; 1854–1858	Succeeded by Sir Arthur Fanshawe
Peerage of the United Kingdom
New creation	Baron Lyons; 1856–1858	Succeeded by Richard Lyons
Baronetage of the United Kingdom
New creation	Baronet (of Christchurch); 1840–1858	Succeeded by Richard Lyons
