= St Mary's Church, Harrow on the Hill =

Coordinates: 51°34′27″N 0°20′15″W

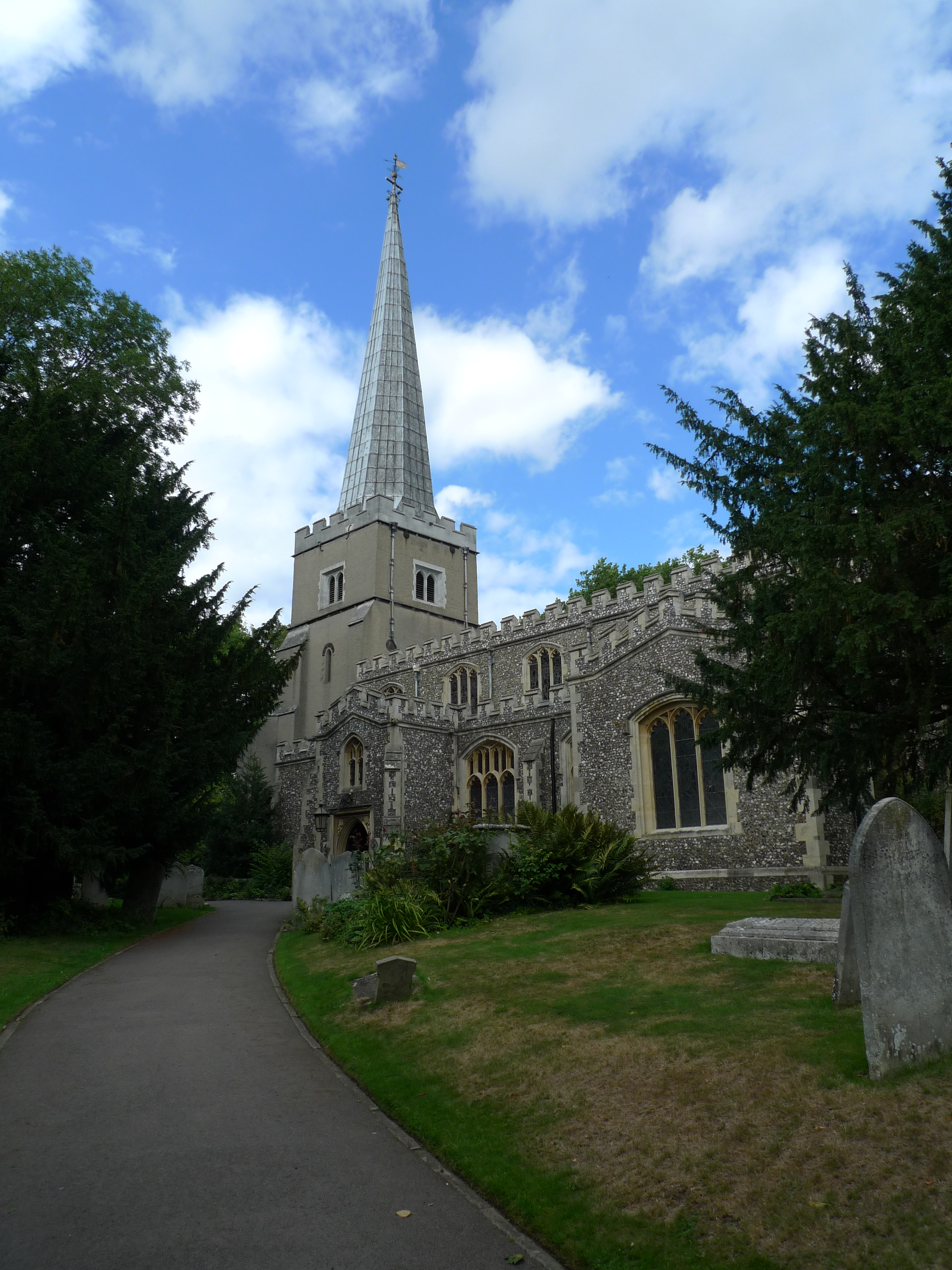
- St Mary's Church
- St Mary's Church, Harrow on the Hill
- OS grid reference: TQ 15316 87452
- Location: Harrow on the Hill, London, HA1 3HL
- Country: England
- Denomination: Church of England
- Churchmanship: Central churchmanship
- Website: stmarysharrow.org.uk

History
- Status: Active
- Founded: 1087
- Founder: Lanfranc
- Dedication: Blessed Virgin Mary
- Consecrated: Anselm of Canterbury, 4 January 1094

Architecture
- Functional status: Parish church
- Heritage designation: Grade I listed
- Architectural type: Church
- Style: English Gothic

Specifications
- Materials: sandstone, tiled roof

Administration
- Province: Province of Canterbury
- Diocese: Diocese of London
- Archdeaconry: Archdeaconry of Northolt
- Deanery: Harrow
- Parish: Harrow on the Hill

Clergy
- Bishop(s): Diocesan See in Vacancy; The Rt Revd Lusa Nsenga-Ngoy
- Vicar(s): The Revd James Mosher CD, BA Vind., MDiv AST

St Mary's, Harrow on the Hill, is the Borough and Parish Church at Harrow on the Hill in northwest London, England. It is a Grade I-listed building.

== History ==
Lanfranc, Archbishop of Canterbury, began the construction of a church on this site in 1087. He died in 1089. His successor was St Anselm, who at the age of 60 was enthroned – after considerable delay – as archbishop in September 1093.

The new church building, now completed and dedicated in the name of the Blessed Virgin Mary, was consecrated by St Anselm on 4 January 1094 (a most appropriate date, as at the time, 25 December was a more pagan festival and Christians kept the feast of the Epiphany or Old Christmas Day as it came to be called – as their principal feast of the birth of Christ).

Little of this original building remains apart from the lower section of the tower. The Chancel, with its fine arch and lancet windows, had been constructed by the end of the 12th century and this was followed by the rebuilding of the nave and the addition of the two transepts. The Rector of Harrow at this time was one Elias of Dereham (who was also involved in the building of Salisbury Cathedral) and it was he who appointed the first vicar, John de Holtune, about the year 1236.

In 1324, two chantries (small chapels endowed for the purpose of special prayer on behalf of their benefactors) were founded. One was the Chantry of St Michael in the free chapel of Tokyngton, which was situated about one and a half miles away in Wembley. The second was founded by the then rector, William de Bosco, ‘‘to the honour of God and the Blessed Virgin Mary’’, and was in the present building. It had been assumed that this chantry was somewhere in the south transept, but recent investigations have convincingly suggested that it was over the south porch.

The small room, still there at the top of the staircase, contains evidence of Norman work, traces of colour decoration on the roof beams and a carved niche. John Byrkhede, himself a master builder, was appointed Rector of St Mary's in 1437, and died at Harrow in 1468. By 1450, the present clerestory windows, the nave and transept roofs, in the chancel and the upper stages of the tower with its famous spire, had been constructed. The roofs of the nave and transepts are reckoned to be the finest in Middlesex with 377 carvings, while the spire is covered with 12 tons of lead.

400 years later, extensive restoration and renovation took place under George Gilbert Scott between 1846 and 1849. A parapet was added to the nave and aisle roofs, the north wall of the chancel was pulled down to enlarge the building, the east walls were rebuilt, the church building faced with flint and a vestry added to the north side. This vestry was further enlarged about the turn of the 20th century.

A proposal in 1893 to build an organ at the south side of the chancel was abandoned when three Norman windows were uncovered, still showing decoration on the splays. The T.C.Lewis Company was commissioned to build a three manual organ which was completed in 1900. In 1932, Henry Willis & Co added new stops on the Great and Swell division. In 1970, Rushworth & Dreaper rebuilt the organ. B.C.Shepard of London electrified the stop action and Great/Swell organ division in 1991 and 1994. The Lewis console was modernised by David Wells of Liverpool in 1998.

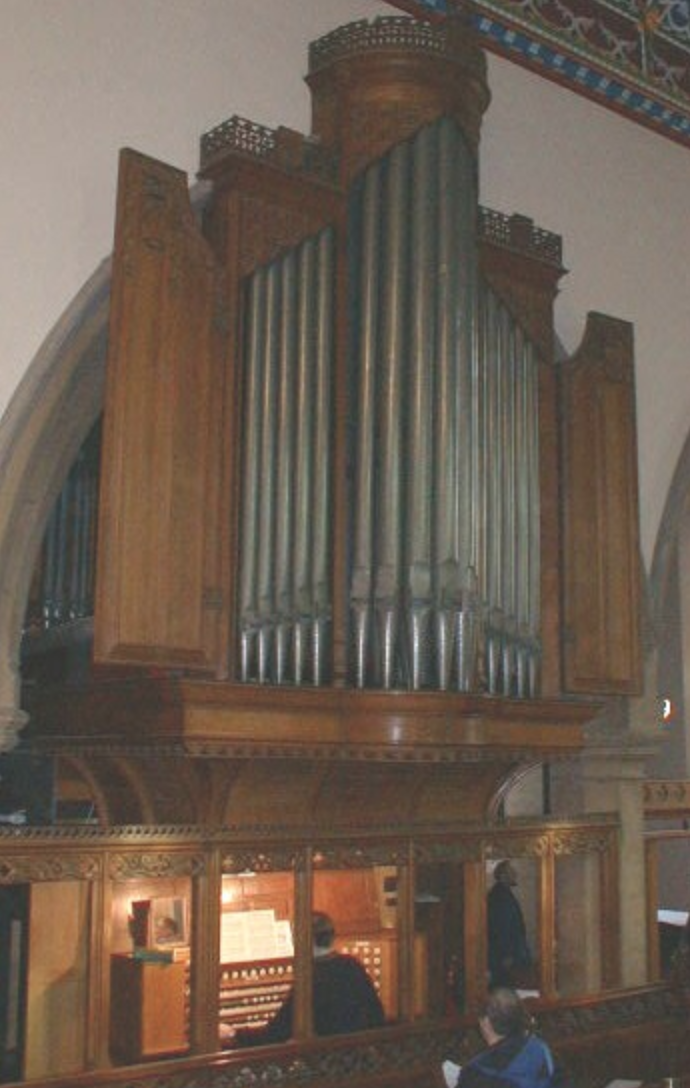
Martin Singleton playing St Mary's T.C.Lewis organ, 2001

The chancel roof, which had been renewed in the 18th century, was decorated in 1972 by Campbell Smith & Co.

There are thirteen ancient brasses in the church, mostly badly mutilated. The cope, to be seen in the North transept, was made for the 900th anniversary of the laying of the foundation stone, and the embroidered designs on this were copied from the mutilated brass of John Byrkhede in the chancel.

The brass to John Lyon, founder of Harrow School, and his wife, Joan, is on the wall of the nave, near his grave by the lectern. It has an interesting inscription in English. The gravestone on the floor, with a Latin inscription, was laid in 1875.

Lord Byron was a frequent visitor as a schoolboy from Harrow school, from 1801 to 1805, and he sat dreaming by "his favourite tombstone" (the "Peachey Tomb"), as recorded in "Lines Written beneath an Elm in the Churchyard of Harrow", which is reproduced on a memorial in front of the Peachey Tomb, erected by the son of one of Byron's school friends in 1905. The Elm burnt down sometime prior to 1935. Byron's daughter Allegra Byron (by Clair Clairmont) is buried in an unmarked grave outside, very near to the south porch.

The old door into the north porch used to be on the south side and was moved to its present position by Gilbert Scott for better protection. The font, of Purbeck marble, and the chest in the north transept, like this door have been in use since 1200 – or even earlier. The pulpit is a good example of late 17th century woodcarving, placed in the church in 1708.

There are ten bells in the tower. The two smallest commemorate Queen Elizabeth II's Silver Jubilee and were founded by the Whitechapel Bell Foundry. The oldest was founded in 1654 by William Whitmore, and the second oldest in 1683 by William I Eldridge. The remaining six were founded in 1960 by John Taylor & Co Ltd.

== Location ==
The church is at the top of Harrow Hill and views towards Central London and most other directions can be seen from the churchyard. It is the highest building in Middlesex. Notable buildings that can be seen are the buildings of Canary Wharf, and the BT Tower in Warren Street, some fourteen and nine miles respectively away from Harrow, and Wembley Stadium.

The church is often the icon of Harrow and can be seen from miles. Since WWI, it has been used as a navigational reference for aircraft approaching RAF Northolt.

== Notable memorials ==
The church has memorials to:

- George Butler, head master, 1805–1829
- John William Cunningham (1811–1861), vicar
- Byron Drury (1815-1888), admiral
- Joseph Drury, Head Master, 1785–1805
- James Edwards, bookseller
- William Gerard, politician
- John Lyon (1514–1592), founder of Harrow School, and benefactor of the John Lyon School and the John Lyon's Charity
- Geoffrey Harold Woolley VC (1944–1952), vicar

In the north aisle are:

- John Henry North, politician
- William Osgoode (1754-1824), first Chief Justice of Upper Canada (now Ontario, Canada)

== Filming Location ==
The church features in some early scenes of the 2008 British science fantasy film Franklyn.
