= Château de Lyons-la-Forêt =

Former castle in France

Coordinates: 49.399°N 1.473°E

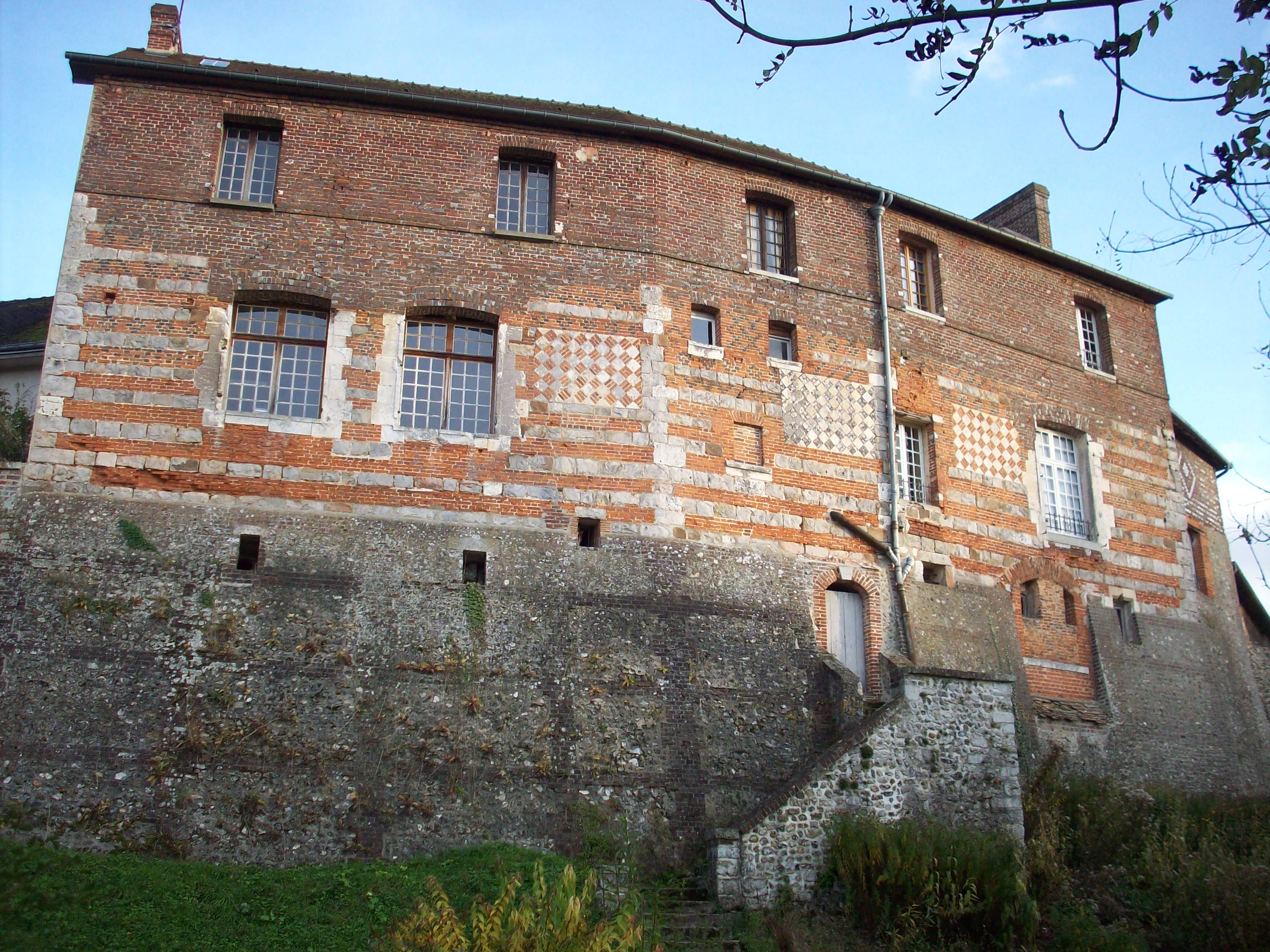
Remains of the rampart

The Château de Lyons-la-Forêt was a castle in Lyons-la-Forêt in the Eure département of France.

The castle was constructed at the start of the 12th century by Henry I of England, also known as "Henri Beauclerc". He died there in 1135, supposedly from "a surfeit of lampreys". The town and the castle were occupied by King Philip II Augustus of France in 1193 but the following year, Richard I of England, back from captivity, recovered Lyons and stayed there frequently until 1198.

The castle had four large towers and four gates, each guarded by a different seigneur. At the beginning of the 17th century it was described as being in ruins, with only the chapel of Saint Nicolas remaining. The foundations of the imposing keep were exposed during summer 2007.

== See also ==
- List of castles in France
