= Warkworth, Northamptonshire =

Village in Northamptonshire, England

Coordinates: 52.0597°N 1.2895°W

Warkworth
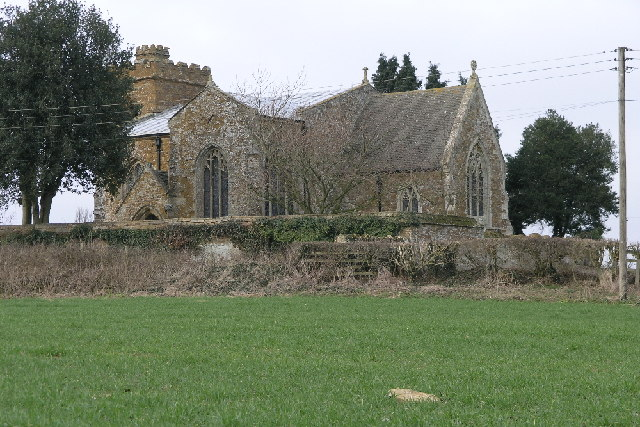
- St Mary the Virgin parish church

- Location within Northamptonshire
- Population: 31 (2001 census)
- OS grid reference: SP4840
  - London: 74 miles (119 km)
- Unitary authority: West Northamptonshire
- Ceremonial county: Northamptonshire
- Region: East Midlands
- Country: England
- Sovereign state: United Kingdom
- Post town: Banbury
- Postcode district: OX17
- Dialling code: 01295
- Police: Northamptonshire
- Fire: Northamptonshire
- Ambulance: East Midlands
- UK Parliament: South Northamptonshire

Warkworth is a village and civil parish in West Northamptonshire, about 2 miles (3 km) east of Banbury in Oxfordshire and 1 mile (1.6 km) southeast of junction 11 of the M40 motorway. The 2001 census recorded the parish's population as 31.

== History ==
The village's name means 'We(o)rca's enclosure' or 'We(o)rce's enclosure', a female individual name. Bede makes reference to an abbess called Verce in Tynemouth in the seventh century. On the other hand, the individual name may be 'Waeferce'.

Warkworth was historically a chapelry which formed a detached part of the ancient parish of Marston St Lawrence. For the purposes of administering parish responsibilities under the poor laws, the chapelry of Warkworth was jointly administered with the part of Banbury parish which was in Northamptonshire, comprising the hamlets of Grimsbury and Nethercote. In 1866 the legal definition of 'parish' was changed to be the areas used for administering the poor laws, and so Warkworth became a civil parish which included Grimsbury and Nethercote. Grimsbury and Nethercote formed part of municipal borough of Banbury from 1889, and were removed from the civil parish of Warkworth in 1894, after which the civil parish corresponded to the old chapelry of Warkworth.

Warkworth Inclosure Act 1764
- Act of Parliament
- Parliament of Great Britain
- Long title: An Act for dividing and enclosing the Open and Common Field, Common Meadows, Common Pastures, Common Grounds, and Commonable Lands, lying within the Township, Hamlets, and Liberties, of Warkworth, in the County of Northampton.
- Citation: 4 Geo. 3. c. 67 Pr.
- Territorial extent: Great Britain

Dates
- Royal assent: 19 April 1764
- Commencement: 15 November 1763 (Note: Start of session.)

Status: Current legislation

An open field system of farming prevailed in Warkworth until the 18th century. A single inclosure act, the Warkworth Inclosure Act 1764 (4 Geo. 3. c. 67 Pr.) was used to enclose the formerly separate open field systems of Warkworth, Grimsbury, Nethercote and Overthorpe (the latter being a hamlet in Middleton Cheney parish).

=== Lyons family ===
Nicholas de Lyons, who with his son Sir John de Lyons emigrated from Normandy to England in 1080, was granted lands at Warkworth by William the Conqueror. Nicholas was the son of Ingelram de Lyons The Elder, who had arrived in England in 1066, with the Norman Conquest, to fight at the Battle of Hastings.

Nicholas de Lyons's descendants subsequently bought Warkworth Castle, Northamptonshire, which was the English seat of the Lyons family until 1412. It was a castellated mansion that consisted of a body with two wings, forming three sides of a quadrangle, with a large gatehouse and semi-circular towers. It was converted into a spectacular house by subsequent owners, during the Jacobean period, but was demolished c.1805.

Several members of the de Lyons family are buried at the Church of St Mary at Warkworth, including two in tombs with effigies (see below).

== Church of St Mary ==
The Church of St Mary is 14th-century Decorated Gothic. The Church was partly rebuilt in 1840–41 and 1869, and on the latter occasion under the direction of Charles Driver. The three-bay north arcade, the arch and east window of the south transept, and the windows in the south aisle are 14th-century. The south arcade, north aisle windows, chancel and top of the west tower are 19th-century Gothic Revival. The south aisle has a squint to the chancel. The Church is Grade II* listed.

St Mary's parish is a member of the Chenderit Benefice, which includes the parishes of Chacombe, Greatworth, Marston St. Lawrence, Middleton Cheney and Thenford.

=== Monuments to de Lyons and Chetwode families ===
Inside the church are several English church monuments.

Several members of the de Lyons family are buried in the Church. In the arcade are the tombs with effigies of Sir John de Lyons (c. 1268-1312) and his wife Margaret Chetwode, who was the daughter of Sir John Chetwode. Lyons is shown in armour but with his head comfortably resting on two pillows and with a lion on his feet. Margaret also has a similar number of pillows that are held in place by two patient angels. They both lie staring upwards.

Nearby is the grander tomb and effigy of their son Sir John de Lyons (c. 1289-1371), who was Lord of Warkworth in 1322, in armour such as that which he would have worn at the Battle of Crecy and the Battle of Poitiers. He is depicted in his military costume of a helmet, a cyclas (a loose garment worn over armour), a dagger-belt decorated with roses, and a sword in a ornamented scabbard. There is another lion at his feet. In the arcades beneath are figures and coats-of-arms and at the tomb's head there is a praying knight. His daughter and heir married Sir John Chetwode, to whom the Lyons estate at Warkworth passed when she died without male siblings, after which Chetwode adopted the older Lyons coat-of-arms and the title 'Lord of Warkworth'.

Therefore, the Chetwode family also are buried and commemorated in the Church. There are five 15th-century monumental brasses: to Sir John Chetwode (died 1412), a second John Chetwode (died 1420), Margaret Brounyng (died 1420), Lady Chetwode (died 1430) and William Ludsthorp (died 1454). There is also an 18th-century monument to William Holman (died 1740).

== Amenities ==
The Jurassic Way long-distance footpath passes through Warkworth village.

== See also ==
- Grimsbury
- Nethercote, Banbury

== Sources ==
- Pevsner, Nikolaus. The Buildings of England: Northamptonshire (2nd Edition, Revised by Cherry, Bridget. Yale University Press. p. 444.
- RCHME, ed. (1982). An Inventory of the Historical Monuments in the County of Northamptonshire. Vol. 4, Archaeological Sites in South-West Northamptonshire. London: Her Majesty's Stationery Office. pp. 161–162.
