= Algernon Lyons =

Royal Navy Admiral of the Fleet (1833–1908)

Admiral of the Fleet Sir Algernon Lyons GCB DL JP
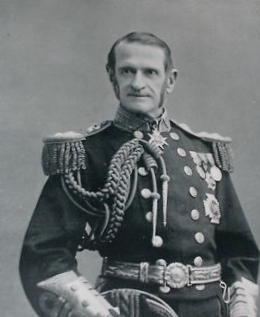
- Sir Algernon McLennan Lyons
- Born: 30 August 1833; Satara, India
- Died: 9 February 1908 (aged 74); Kilvrough Manor, Glamorgan
- Relatives: Lieutenant-General Humphrey Lyons (father); John Lyons of Antigua (grandfather); Edmund Lyons, 1st Baron Lyons (uncle); Vice-Admiral John Lyons (uncle); Richard Lyons, 1st Viscount Lyons (first cousin); Augusta Mary Minna Catherine Lyons (first cousin), 14th Duchess of Norfolk; Anne Theresa Bickerton Lyons, (first cousin) Baroness von Würtzburg; Commander Algernon Edmund Penrice Lyons DSO (son)
- Military career
- Allegiance: United Kingdom
- Branch: Royal Navy
- Service years: 1847–1903
- Rank: Admiral of the Fleet
- Commands: Pacific Station; North America and West Indies Station; Plymouth Command
- Conflicts: Crimean War
- Awards: Knight Grand Cross of the Order of the Bath

Admiral of the Fleet Sir Algernon McLennan Lyons GCB DL JP (30 August 1833 – 9 February 1908) was a senior Royal Navy officer who served as first and principal naval aide-de-camp to Queen Victoria.

Lyons also served as commander-in-chief, Pacific Station, commander-in-chief, North America and West Indies Station, and then commander-in-chief, Plymouth. He was described as 'a very smart seaman of the old school, and a good and popular officer'.

He was the nephew of Admiral Edmund Lyons, 1st Baron Lyons, who led the Royal Navy during the Crimean War, and of Vice-Admiral John Lyons (1787–1872), who fought on HMS Victory at the Battle of Trafalgar and who served as British Ambassador in Egypt.

== Family ==
Lyons was born at Bombay on 30 August 1833. He was the second son of Lieutenant-General Humphrey Lyons (1833–1908) and his first wife, Elizabeth, daughter of Henry Bennett. Lyons's uncles were Admiral Edmund Lyons, 1st Baron Lyons, who led the Royal Navy during the Crimean War, and Vice-Admiral John Lyons (1787–1872), who fought on HMS Victory at the Battle of Trafalgar and who served as British Ambassador in Egypt. His grandfather was Captain John Lyons of Antigua.

Lyons was privately educated in Twickenham, Middlesex.

== Naval career ==
Lyons joined the Royal Navy in 1847, when he was appointed to the fifth-rate HMS Cambrian on the East Indies and China Station. He was transferred to the second-rate HMS Albion, flagship of his uncle, Sir Edmund Lyons, who was Second-in-Command of the Mediterranean Fleet, in 1853.

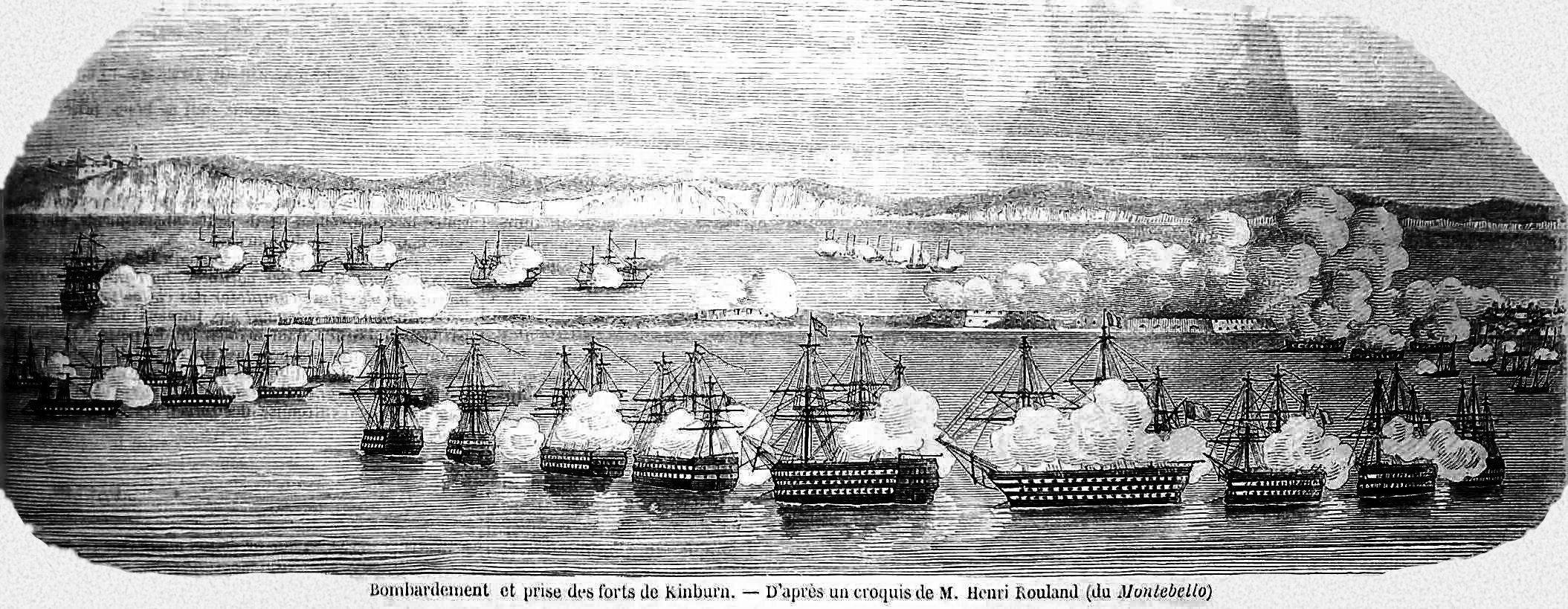
The Battle of Kinburn in October 1855

Lyons was promoted to mate in October 1853 and transferred to the paddle frigate HMS Firebrand, which was engaged in the blockade of the Danube Delta, which was held by the Russians at the start of the Crimean War. Lyons was promoted to lieutenant on 26 June 1854.

=== Lyons’s rampage at the Danube ===
During the blockade of the mouth of the Danube, Captain Parker, Lyons's commanding officer, attacked the guardhouses and signal stations higher up the river that were responsible for the supply and communication of the Russian military. On 8 July, Captain Parker's party received fire by Cossacks by which he was shot and killed. When Parker was killed, Lyons took control of the British boats and proceeded to destroy not only the first Russian signal station, but the next four signal stations up the river, causing the Russians to flee. For this, he was mentioned in dispatches.

Lyons then became commander of HMS Firebrand for the bombardment of Sevastopol in October 1854, which was led by his uncle Admiral Sir Edmund Lyons. When the British flagship, HMS Albion, was set on fire by the Russians, Lyons attached it, whilst burning, to his own ship and towed it to safety.

=== Kerch and Kinburn ===
In December 1854, Lyons's uncle Edmund Lyons, 1st Baron Lyons, became Commander in Chief of the Mediterranean Fleet and appointed Lyons as his Flag-Lieutenant. Lyons commanded the first-rate HMS Royal Albert, in December 1854 during the operations at Kerch in October 1854 and at the Battle of Kinburn in October 1855. He was promoted to commander on 9 August.

=== American Civil War ===
Lyons became commanding officer of the sloop HMS Racer on the North America and West Indies Station in May 1860. In HMS Racer he protected British merchant vessels that sought to evade the blockade by the United States Navy on Confederate ports.

=== Pacific Station ===
Lyons was promoted to captain on 1 December 1862. He became commanding officer of the corvette HMS Charybdis on the Pacific Station in January 1867 and commanding officer of the frigate HMS Immortalité in a detached squadron in October 1872. He was appointed Commodore-in-Charge at Jamaica, and aide-de-camp to Queen Victoria, in 1875. In April 1878 he became commanding officer of the armoured turret ship HMS Monarch in the Mediterranean Fleet. He was deployed to Constantinople during his tour in HMS Monarch.

=== Admiral ===
Lyons was promoted to rear-admiral on 26 September 1878. He became Commander-in-Chief, Pacific Station, with his flag in the armoured ship HMS Swiftsure, in December 1881. On 27 October 1884, he was promoted to vice-admiral. He became Commander-in-Chief of the North America and West Indies Station in September 1886: with his flagship the central battery ship HMS Bellerophon.

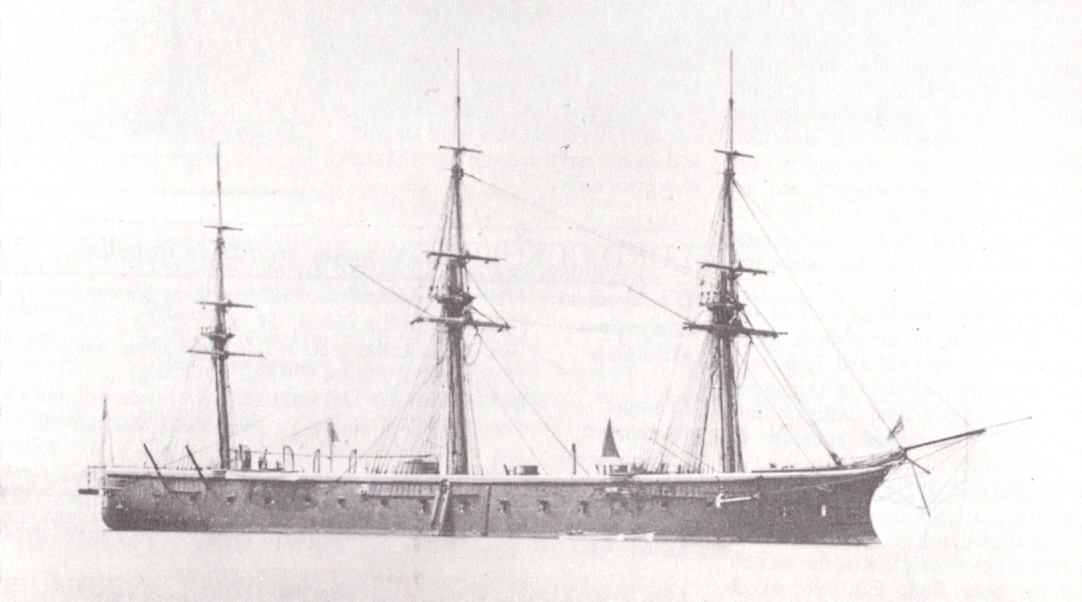
The central battery ship HMS Bellerophon, Lyons's flagship as Commander-in-Chief, North America and West Indies Station

Lyons was promoted to admiral on 15 December 1888 and appointed a Knight Commander of the Order of the Bath in the 1889 Birthday Honours. He was appointed Commander-in-Chief, Plymouth, in June 1892. In February 1895, he was appointed First and Principal Naval Aide-de-Camp to Queen Victoria, as which he served until his promotion to Admiral of the Fleet on 28 August 1897. He was appointed a Knight Grand Cross of the Order of the Bath in the 1897 Diamond Jubilee Honours and was promoted to Admiral of the Fleet on 23 August 1897. He retired from the Navy on 30 August 1903.

== Civic Life ==
He was a Deputy Lieutenant, Justice of the Peace, and Chairman of the Bench of Magistrates for Glamorgan.

He was a member of the Army and Navy Club and the United Service Club.

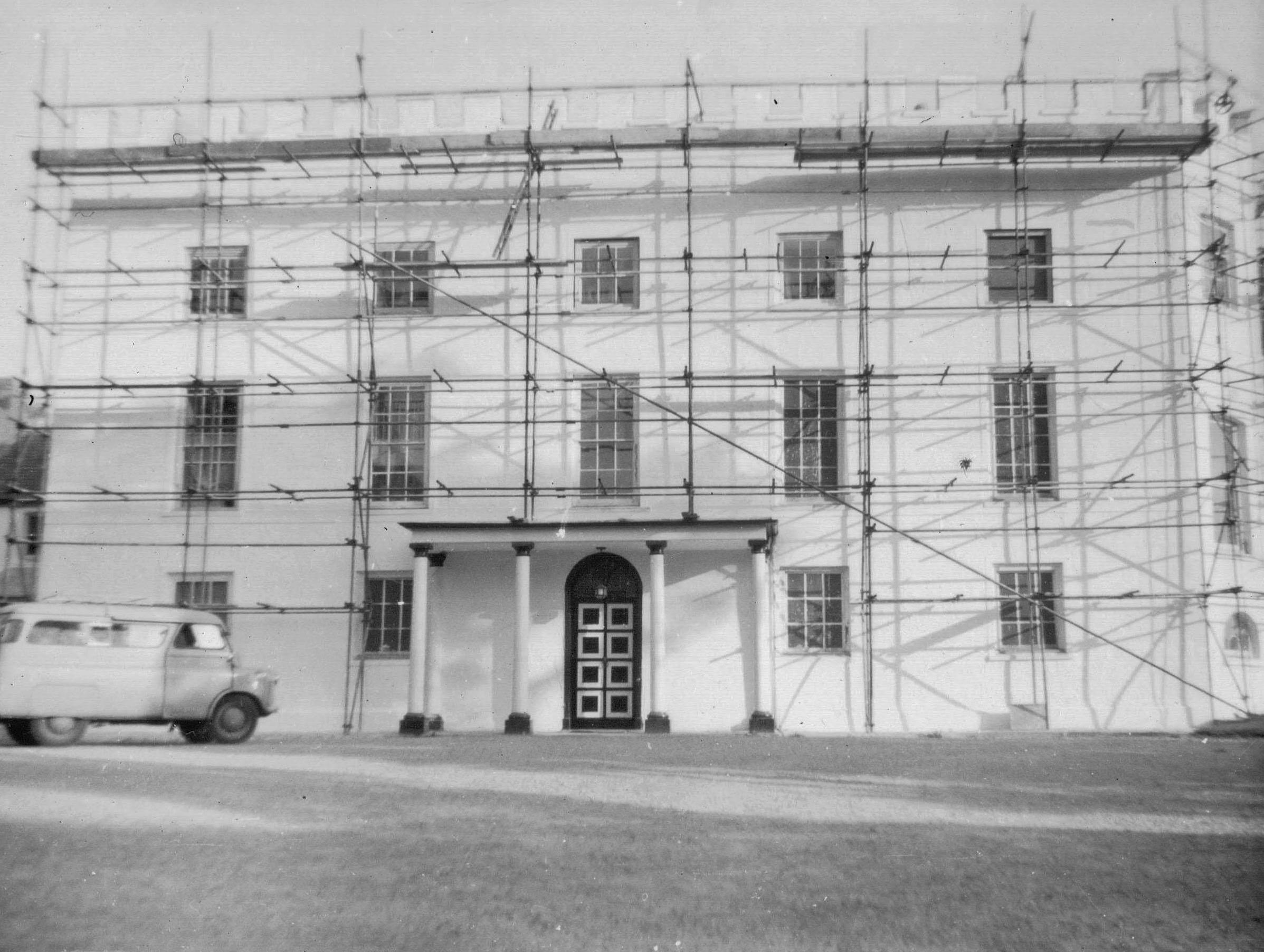
Kilvrough Manor, the Lyons family home in Glamorgan

He died at his residence, Kilvrough Manor in Glamorgan, on 9 February 1908.

=== Issue ===
Lyons married Louisa Jane Penrice (bapt. 1853), daughter and heir of Thomas Penrice, at Pennard Church in Kilvrough on 3 September 1879. They had two sons and two daughters: Thomas Humphrey Lyons (b. 1880), Algernon Edmund Penrice Lyons (b. 1886), Winifred, and Maud, the latter of whom married the diplomat Edgar Walter Mead.

His eldest son Thomas Humphrey Lyons (b. 1880) was educated at Eton College and Magdalen College, Oxford, and was a member of the St James's Club, and entered the diplomatic service, but died in November 1918.

Kilvrough Manor was inherited by his eldest surviving son Commander Algernon Edmund Penrice Lyons DSO of Glazebrook House, South Brent, Devon, who sold it in 1920. Algernon Edmund Penrice Lyons owned Glazebrook House from 1945 to 1970, after which it was converted into a hotel.

== See also ==
- Lyons family

== Sources ==
- "Sir Algernon Lyons". Oxford Dictionary of National Biography (online ed.). Oxford University Press. 2004. doi:10.1093/ref:odnb/34650. (Subscription, Wikipedia Library access or UK public library membership required.)
- Laughton, Leonard G.H. (1912). Dictionary of National Biography: Lyons, Algernon McLennan.
- Heathcote, Tony (2002). The British Admirals of the Fleet 1734 – 1995. Pen & Sword Ltd. ISBN 0-85052-835-6.
- "Edmund Lyons, 1st Baron Lyons". Oxford Dictionary of National Biography (online ed.). Oxford University Press. 2004. doi:10.1093/ref:odnb/34650. (Subscription, Wikipedia Library access or UK public library membership required.)
- Eardley-Wilmot, S. M. Lord Lyons: Life of Vice-Admiral Edmund, Lord Lyons. Sampson Low, Marston and Company, 1898.

Military offices
Preceded by Frederick Stirling	Commander-in-Chief, Pacific Station; 1881–1884	Succeeded by Sir John Baird
Preceded by The Earl of Clanwilliam	Commander-in-Chief, North America and West Indies Station; 1886–1888	Succeeded by Sir George Watson
Preceded by The Duke of Edinburgh	Commander-in-Chief, Plymouth; 1893–1896	Succeeded by Sir Edmund Fremantle
Honorary titles
Preceded by Sir Geoffrey Hornby	First and Principal Naval Aide-de-Camp; 1895–1897	Succeeded by Sir Nowell Salmon
