= Lyons (surname) =

Family name

Lyons is a surname with several origins.

== Anglo-Norman Origin ==
It is the name of an Anglo-Norman landed gentry family descended from Ingelram de Lyons The Elder, who arrived in England with the Norman Conquest of 1066 and fought at the Battle of Hastings. He is listed as a companions of William the Conqueror in the Battle Abbey Roll. His son Nicholas de Lyons, who, with his son Sir John de Lyons, emigrated from Normandy to England in 1080, was granted lands at Warkworth, Northamptonshire, by William.

The Norman family surname was 'de Lyons' ('of [the Castle and Forest of] Lyons'): but the 'de' was eventually omitted from the surname of the emigrant family. Subsequently (as a consequence of the lack, before the 18th century, of standardised spelling for the French pronunciation of the surname) some English branches removed the 's' from the end of the surname, producing 'Lyon'. For example, the 16th century Lord Mayor of London Sir John Lyon used the spelling 'Lyon', despite that his father, Thomas Lyons [sic] of Perivale, used the spelling 'Lyons'.

=== Irish Protestant and Antiguan branch ===
In 1622, after their involvement in the Tudor conquest of Ireland, a branch of the Anglo-Norman family settled in Ireland, with a seat at King's County that was named River Lyons, and a seat at County Westmeath that was named Ledestown/Ledistown Hall. Several members of the Irish family served as High Sheriff of Westmeath and High Sheriff of King’s County during the 17th and 18th centuries. This Irish branch of the family owned 563 acres in Antigua. Some of its descendants were ennobled in the British peerage.

=== Middlesex branch ===
The unennobled landowning English line of the Norman Warkworth family who did not emigrate to Ireland and Antigua had ceased to reside at Warkworth by the 16th century, after which they resided predominantly in Middlesex.

== Celtic Irish Origin ==
There is also a Celtic Irish family, unrelated to the Anglo-Norman family, and whose name derives from the Celtic word for 'grey', through the Irish names of Ó Laighin and 'Ó Liatháin.

== Scottish Origins ==
It dubiously has been asserted that Sir John Lyon (1289–1348), Baron of Forteviot, Forgandenny, and Drumgawan (whose ancestors emigrated to Scotland the end of the eleventh century, in the retinue of Edgar, to fight against Donald Bane, and were granted lands in Perthshire that were later called Glen Lyon) was a descendant of the Norman family. However, the usually reliable genealogist Sir Iain Moncreiffe stated that the Scottish Clan Lyon were of Celtic, not Norman, origin and that they were descended from a younger son of the Clan Lamont, not from any French family.

The surname is also carried by an unrelated 21st century Scottish crime family from Glasgow.

== Jewish Origin ==
The surname is also carried by unrelated Jewish people in south England and in the USA, whose surname is an associative variant of the name Levi that originates from the Netherlands and Germany.

== People with the surname ==
=== A ===
- Aidan Lyons (1878–1910), South African cricketer
- Al Lyons (1918–1965), US baseball player
- Alexander Lyons (1867–1939), American rabbi
- Sir Algernon Lyons, Admiral of the Fleet and First and Principal Naval Aide-de-Camp to Queen Victoria
- Andrew Lyons (born 1966), English soccer player
- Anne Theresa Bickerton Lyons, (1815–1894) British Baroness von Würtzburg.
- Anthony Lyons (born c. 1968), British property investor
- Arthur Lyons (1946–2008), American fiction writer
- Arthur S. Lyons (1895–1963), actors talent agent
- Austin Lyons also known as Superblue (born 1956) Trinidadian male soca singer and the father of Fay-Ann Lyons-Alvarez

=== B ===
- Barry Lyons (footballer) (born 1945), English soccer player
- Barry Lyons (baseball) (born 1960), US baseball player
- Ben Lyons (born 1981), US film critic
- Bert Lyons (footballer) (1902–1981), English footballer
- Bert Lyons (trade unionist) (1929–2008), British trade unionist
- Bill Lyons (born 1958), US baseball player
- Billy Red Lyons (1932–2009), Canadian wrestler
- Bonnie Lyons (born 1944), US writer and educator
- Brandon Lyons (born 1990), American Para-cyclist
- Brittany Lyons (born 1988), Jamaican model
- Brooke Lyons (born 1980), US actress

=== C ===
- C. J. Lyons (fl. 2000s), US physician and author
- C. P. Lyons (1915–1998), Canadian outdoorsman
- Charlie Lyons, US film producer and financier
- Charles W. Lyons (1868–1939), American Jesuit and academic administrator
- Chalmers J. Lyons, (1874–1935) Oral surgeon
- Claire Lyons, fictional character
- Cliff Lyons (born 1961), Australian rugby league player
- Cliff Lyons (actor) (1901–1974), American motion picture stuntman, second-unit director, and actor
- Curt Lyons (born 1974), US baseball player
- Cyril Lyons (born 1959), Irish athlete in hurling
- Charles Albert Lyons (born 19290, General Secretary of TSSA for 7 years.

=== D ===
- Dan Lyons, CEO, Centre for Animals and Social Justice
- Dana Lyons (fl. 1970–2000s), US musician and environmental activist
- Daniel Lyons (born 1960), US author
- Danny Lyons (1860–1888), US street gang figure
- Darryn Lyons (born 1965), Australian-born British news photographer
- David Lyons (rugby union, born 1980), Australian rugby player
- David Lyons (actor) (born 1976), Australian television actor
- David Lyons (rugby union, born 1985), English rugby union player
- David Lyons (swimmer) (born 1943), US swimmer
- de Courcy Lyons (cricketer) (1908–1976), Argentine cricketer
- Deb Lyons (fl. 1980–2000s), US singer and songwriter
- Denis Lyons (1935–2014), Irish politician
- Denny Lyons (1866–1929), US baseball player
- Derek Lyons (fl. 2018), American political advisor
- Dicky Lyons (born 1947), US football player
- Donal Lyons (fl. 2000s), Irish politician

=== E ===
- Ed Lyons (1923–2009), US baseball player
- Eddie Lyons (1886–1926), US film actor
- Edmund Lyons, 1st Baron Lyons (1790–1858), British diplomat and military leader and Admiral during the Crimean War
- Captain Edmund Moubray Lyons, Royal Navy Captain during Crimean War (1819–1855)
- Edward Lyons (disambiguation), several people
- Eileen Lyons (born 1941), American politician
- Enid Lyons (1897–1981), Australian politician
- Ernest Lyon (1860–1938), US-Belizean minister, educator, and diplomat
- Eric Lyons (1912–1980), British architect
- Eugene Lyons (1898–1985), US author

=== F ===
- Fay-Ann Lyons (born 1980), Trinidadian singer
- Francis Stewart Leland Lyons (1923–1983), Irish historian

=== G ===
- Gene Lyons (born 1943), American author and political analyst
- George Lyons (disambiguation), several people
- Grace Turk, formerly Grace Lyons (born 1991), American softball player
- Grace Lyons (cricketer) (born 2005), Australian cricketer
- Graham Lyons (born 1969), Australian rugby player
- Grant Lyons (born 1941), American writer

=== H ===
- Harry Lyons (disambiguation), several people
- Henry A. Lyons (c. 1809–1872), second Chief Justice of the Supreme Court of California
- Sir Henry George Lyons (1864–1944), geologist and director of the Science Museum in London
- Henry Lyons (b. 1942), former President of the National Baptist Convention
- Hersh Lyons (1915–2008), US baseball player
- Humphrey Lyons (1802–1873), British general in India

=== I ===
- Israel Lyons (1739–1775), English mathematician and botanist
- Ingelram Lyons, Lord of Lyons (c. 1020–1085), progenitor of the Lyons family

=== J ===
- Jack Lyons (disambiguation), several people
- Jacques Judah Lyons (1814–1877), US religious figure
- James J. Lyons (1890–1966), American politician
- James K. Lyons (1960–2007), American film editor and actor
- James L. Lyons (1916–1994), founder of the Monterey Jazz Festival
- James M. Lyons (born 1947), American lawyer, figure in the Whitewater controversy and former federal judicial nominee
- James W. Lyons (1878–1947), Canadian politician
- James Lyons (Upper Canada politician)
- James Lyons (Virginia politician) (1801–1882), Confederate politician
- James "Ace" Lyons, US Navy admiral, former Commander-in-Chief, Pacific Fleet
- Jarryd Lyons (born 1992), Australian rules footballer
- Jason Lyons (born 1970), Australian motorcycle racer
- Jeffrey S. Lyons (1939 or 1940–2015), Canadian lawyer and community activist
- Jeffrey Lyons (born 1944), American television and film critic
- Jimmie Lyons (fl. 1910–1920s), US baseball player
- Jimmy Lyons (disambiguation)
- Sir John Lyons or Lyon (c. 1514 - 1564), Lord Mayor of London
- John Lyons (American football coach) (born 1952), American football coach
- John Lyons (bishop) (1930–2016), Bishop of Ontario, 1932–52
- John Lyons (UK politician) (born 1949), English Labour Party politician
- Captain John Lyons of Antigua, English politician and landowner in Antigua
- Admiral John Lyons (1787 – 1872), Royal Navy officer fought on HMS Victory at the Battle of Trafalgar
- John Lyons (VC) (1823–1867), Irish soldier in the British army, recipient of the Victoria Cross
- John Lyons (ice hockey) (1899–1971), United States ice hockey player who competed in the 1924 Winter Olympics
- John Lyons (horse trainer), author and horse trainer in the field of Natural horsemanship
- John Lyons (hurler) (1923–2005), an Irish sportsperson
- John Lyons (linguist) (1932–2020), English linguist
- John Lyons (poet) (born 1933) is a Trinidad-born poet and artist
- John Lyons (actor) (born 1943), English actor
- John Benignus Lyons (1922–2007), Jack Binignus Lyons, Irish medical historian and author
- John J. Lyons, Secretary of State of New York 1921–1922
- John Lyons (Longford politician), Irish independent / Labour Party politician, represented Longford-Westmeath 1922–27
- Jonathon Lyons (born 1951), British businessman
- Joseph Lyons (1879–1939), Australian prime minister
- Joseph M. Lyons (born 1951), US politician
- Judd H. Lyons (born 1962), American general

=== K ===
- Katie Lyons (born 1981), British actress
- Ken Lyons (1953–2012), US musician
- Kevin Lyons (1923–2000), Australian politician
- Kim Lyons (born 1973), US athlete and trainer

=== L ===
- Lamar Lyons (born 1973), American football player
- Laura Lyons (born 1954), US model
- Leanne "Lelee" Lyons (born 1973), US singer (SWV)
- Leo Lyons (born 1943), English musician
- Leo Lyons (American football) (1892–1976), US football player and manager
- Leonard Lyons (1906–1976), US newspaper columnist
- Leslie A. Lyons (fl. 2000s), US veterinary researcher
- Lorenzo Lyons (1807–1886), US-born missionary in Hawaii
- Louis M. Lyons (1897–1982), US journalist

=== M ===
- Mark Lyons, American basketball player in the Israeli Basketball Premier League
- Marty Lyons (born 1957), US football player
- Marty Lyons (Australian footballer) (born 1956), Australian rules footballer
- Mary Lyons (born 1947), British author
- Michael Lyons (disambiguation), several people
- Mick Lyons (English footballer) (born 1951)
- Mick Lyons (Gaelic footballer) (f. 1980s)
- Miriam Lyons (fl. 2000s), Australian academic and political advisor
- Mitch Lyons (born 1970), US football player
- Mossie Lyons (fl. 2000s), Irish football player

=== N ===
- Nancy Lyons (born 1930), Australian swimmer
- Nathan Lyons (1930–2016), US artist and photographer
- Ned Lyons (fl. 1800s), US gang leader

=== O ===
- Oren Lyons (born 1930), Haudenosaunee, Faithkeeper of the Turtle Clan of the Onondaga

=== P ===
- Pat Lyons (1860–1914), US baseball player
- Patrick Lyons (1903–1967), Australian Catholic prelate; Third Bishop of Christchurch, New Zealand, and Fourth Bishop of Sale, Victoria, Australia
- Paul Lyons, several people, famous American comedian, writer, doctors, and authors
- Peter Lyons (disambiguation), several people
- Pratt Lyons (born 1974), US football player

=== R ===
- Reginald Lyons (1922–1976), Irish cricketer
- Richard Lyons, 1st Earl Lyons, 1st Viscount Lyons, British Ambassador to the United States and France
- Richard Lyons (disambiguation), several people
- Robbie Lyons (1972–2003), US criminal convicted of murder
- Robert Lyons (disambiguation), several people
- Rodney Lyons (born 1962), African-American politician
- Roger Lyons (born 1942), British labor leader
- Ron Lyons (1909–1942), Canadian hockey player
- Ross Lyons (born 1984), Scottish cricketer
- Russell Lyons (born 1957), American mathematician
- Ruth Lyons (disambiguation), several people

=== S ===
- Samuel Lyons (1791–1851), Australian landowner and businessman
- Shane Lyons (born 1988), US television personality
- Shelby Lyons (born 1981), US figure skater
- Simon Lyons (born 1982), English football player
- Sophie Lyons (1848–1924), US criminal figure
- Steve Lyons (baseball) (born 1960), US baseball player and announcer
- Steve Lyons (writer) (fl. 2000s), British writer
- Steve Lyons (rugby league), rugby league footballer of the 1970s and 1980s
- Stuart Lyons (1928–1998), British film producer
- Susan Lyons (born 1957), Australian actress
- Susanne Lyons (born 1957), chair of the United States Olympic & Paralympic Committee (USOPC)

=== T ===
- Ted Lyons (1900–1986), US baseball player and manager
- Terah Lyons, American artificial intelligence specialist
- Terry Lyons (disambiguation), several people * Terri Lyons, female Trinidadian soca singer and sister of Fay-Ann Lyons-Alvarez
- Thomas Lyons (disambiguation), several people, including Tom and Tommy Lyons
- Tracy Lyons (born 1970), British convicted paedophile

=== V ===
- Virginia V. Lyons (born 1944), US politician

=== W ===
- Walker Lyons (born 2004), American football player
- Will Lyons (f. 1990–2000s), British newspaper columnist
- William Lyons (1901–1985), British motorcar businessman
- William L. Lyons (1857–1911), American politician
- Willie James Lyons (1938–1980), American Chicago blues guitarist, singer and songwriter

=== Z ===
- Zoe Lyons (born 1971), English comedy performer

== See also ==
- Lions (surname)
- Lyon (surname)
