= Richard Lyons, 1st Earl Lyons =

British ambassador to United States and to France

The Right Honourable The Earl Lyons GCB GCMG PC
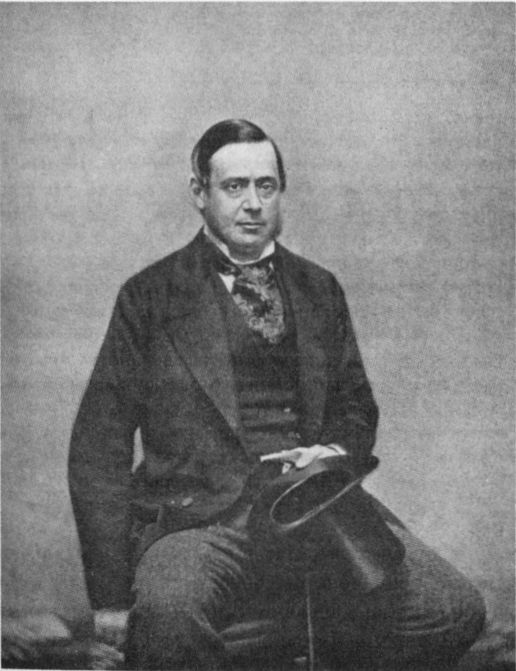
- Richard Bickerton Pemell Lyons, then 1st Viscount Lyons

British Ambassador to France
- In office 1867–1887
- Preceded by: The Earl Cowley
- Succeeded by: The Earl of Lytton

British Ambassador to the Ottoman Empire
- In office 1865–1867
- Preceded by: Sir Henry Bulwer
- Succeeded by: Sir Henry Elliot-Murray-Kynynmound

British Minister to the United States
- In office 1858–1865
- Preceded by: The Lord Napier
- Succeeded by: Sir Frederick Bruce

British Minister to Tuscany
- In office 1858–1858
- Preceded by: Constantine Phipps, 1st Marquess of Normanby
- Succeeded by: Peter Campbell Scarlett

Personal details
- Born: 26 April 1817
- Died: 5 December 1887 (aged 70)
- Relations: John Lyons of Antigua (grandfather); Edmund Lyons, 1st Baron Lyons (father); Vice-Admiral John Lyons (uncle); Augusta Mary Minna Catherine Lyons (sister), 14th Duchess of Norfolk.; Anne Theresa Bickerton Lyons, (sister) Baroness von Würtzburg; Sir Algernon Lyons, Admiral of the Fleet (first cousin)
- Education: Elizabeth College, Guernsey; Homeschooled; Winchester College
- Alma mater: Christ Church, Oxford (BA, MA, DCL)

Richard Bickerton Pemell Lyons, 1st Earl Lyons, GCB, GCMG, PC (26 April 1817 – 5 December 1887) was the leading British diplomat during the four great crises of the second half of the 19th century: Italian unification, the American Civil War, the Eastern Question, and the replacement of France by Germany as the dominant Continental power following the 1870 Franco-Prussian War.

Lyons resolved the Trent Affair during the American Civil War; and contributed to the Special Relationship and to the Entente Cordiale; and predicted, 32 years before World War I, the occurrence of an imperial war between France and Germany that was to destroy Britain's international dominance.

Lyons was offered the office of British Foreign Secretary on three occasions, by three different Prime Ministers (Gladstone, Disraeli, and Salisbury), and was encouraged to accept that office by Queen Victoria, but he declined every offer. Lyons endorsed the British Conservative Party faction of the 3rd Marquess of Salisbury, and was distrusted by Gladstonian Liberals as a 'Tory-leaning diplomat'.

Lyons's most recent biographer Jenkins (2014) considers Lyons to be the exemplar of the ‘Foreign Office mind’ who created a canon of practical norms of diplomacy, including the necessity for nominal neutrality in domestic party politics and for private correspondence with Cabinet ministers. Lyons founded the 'Lyons School' of British diplomacy: which consisted of Sir Edwin Egerton; Sir Maurice de Bunsen; Sir Michael Herbert; Sir Edward Baldwin Malet; Sir Frank Lascelles; Sir Gerard Lowther; Sir Edmund Monson, 1st Baronet; and Sir Nicholas O'Conor.

== Family and early life ==
Lyons was born in Boldre, Lymington, Hampshire, on 26 April 1817. His father was the diplomat and admiral Edmund Lyons, 1st Baron Lyons and his mother was Augusta Louisa Rogers. His siblings were: Anne Theresa Bickerton Lyons (1815 – 1894), who became Baroness von Würtzburg; and Captain Edmund Moubray Lyons (1819 – 1855); and Augusta Mary Minna Catherine Lyons (1821 – 1886), who became Duchess of Norfolk and the grandmother of Philip Kerr, 11th Marquess of Lothian.

His uncles included Vice-Admiral John Lyons (1787–1872), who fought on HMS Victory at the Battle of Trafalgar and who served as British Ambassador in Egypt; and Lieutenant-General Humphrey Lyons (1802–1873), of the Indian Army. His first cousins included Sir Algernon Lyons, Admiral of the Fleet, and Aide-de-Camp to Queen Victoria, and Richard Lyons Pearson of the Grenadier Guards.

Lyons, who was a descendant of a Norman family, was an ardent Francophile who throughout his career 'desired Anglo-French cooperation', and had 'a perceptive assessment of the French collective psyche', and was 'ever ready to exculpate French behaviour'.

== Education ==
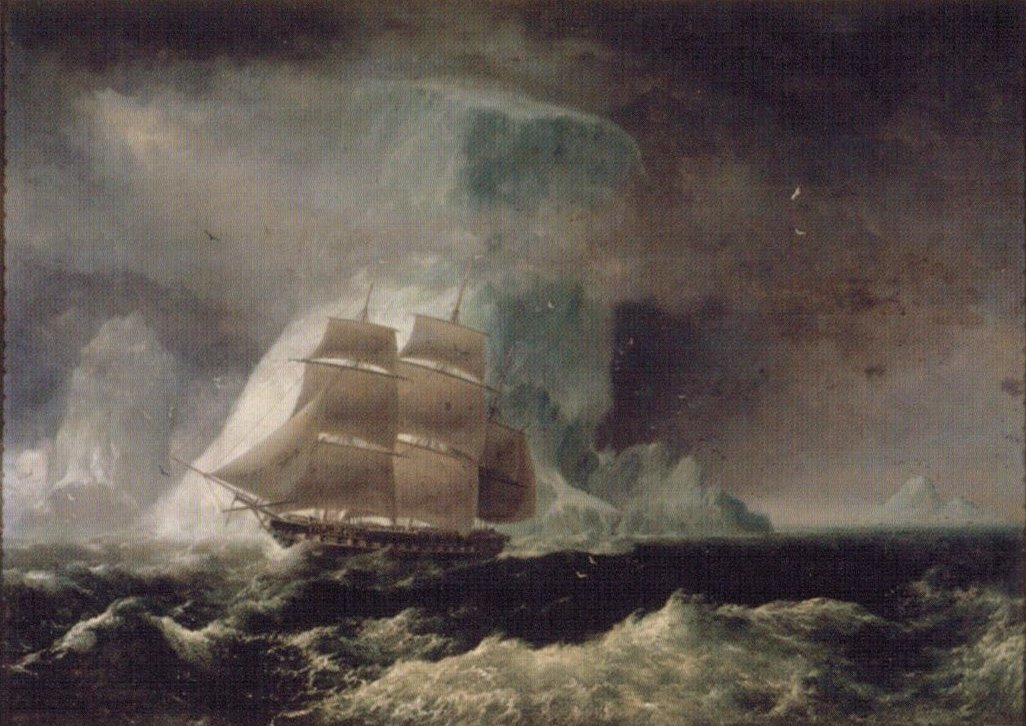
Lyons explored the Mediterranean on his father's ship, HMS Blonde

Lyons was tutored at Elizabeth College, Guernsey, by Sir John Colborne, in classics, English, French, arithmetic, and theology, where he received a Latin Prize in 1828. Lyons liked rhyming verse (including that of Lord Byron and Alexander Pope, both of which he could recite from memory), Latin verse, and melodic music. He knew the poet Samuel Rogers, whom he thought discourteous, and who criticised him for not taking sugar in his tea.

He and all of his siblings accompanied their father and their mother to Valletta, Malta, in 1828, where they were homeschooled in the works of Enlightenment philosophy, including those of William Robertson, and in history and in classical civilisation, and in French and in Modern Greek. After their first tour of the Aegean, Lyons's father returned to Valletta to refit his ship, HMS Blonde, before, on 30 January 1829, sailing again for the Aegean with his two sons: who were tutored on the boat, and explored Greece on excursions into the mainland, and were introduced to prominent members of European society.

Lyons returned to England to attend Winchester College, and subsequently Christ Church, Oxford, from which he received a BA in 1838 and an MA in 1843. He received an honorary DCL from Oxford University in 1865. During the 1880s he studied the works of John Henry Newman.

== Early diplomatic career ==
=== Attaché to Athens ===
Richard Lyons entered the diplomatic service in 1839, when Lord Palmerston appointed him as an unpaid attaché at his father's legation in Athens. In this position, Lyons advocated and sought to implemented, under the authority of his father and his father's direct successor Thomas Wyse, policies conducive to the establishment of constitutional monarchy that would not impede an Ottoman Empire which served as a bulwark against Russian expansion in the British-dominated Mediterranean. Lyons implemented the practices of diplomatic conduct for which he would become famous: he entertained his subordinates with informal hospitality, and consulted them on matters of business, and dined with them several times per week, and provided for their welfare. Lyons believed that British embassies, and opulent dinners with foreign diplomats, should be used to impress the power of the British Empire.

=== Attaché to Saxony and then Minister to Tuscany ===
In 1844, Lyons was made a paid attaché and transferred to Dresden, Saxony. He then served as Minister to the Grand Duchy of Tuscany.

=== Unofficial Minister to the Papal States ===
Lyons was subsequently appointed, by Lord John Russell, as an unofficial representative of Britain to the Papal States. In this office, Lyons was expected to pursue the reform of the unpopular Papal government. Lyons's analyses of the issues, his clarity in his dispatches, and the integrity of his counsel made him admired at the Foreign Office. Russell was impressed with Lyons's achievement of regaining the favour and of the Papal authorities for Protestant Britain, which had enabled Lyons to dissuade the Vatican from the pursuit of the establishment of a Catholic hierarchy in Scotland, which might have caused Anti-Catholic sedition in Britain. Lyons achieved this restoration of favourable relations with the Vatican by refusing to condemn actions, however disagreeable to him, that Britain had no ability to prevent. Lord Russell was so impressed with Lyons that, when Russell succeeded to the Foreign Office in 1859, he urged his nephew, Odo, who had succeeded Lyons in Rome, to imitate the policies and conduct of Lyons.

=== Minister to Florence ===
Between 1856 and 1858, Lyons was Secretary of the British Legation at Florence. He was the British Minister at Florence between February 1858 and December 1858.

== Minister to the United States ==
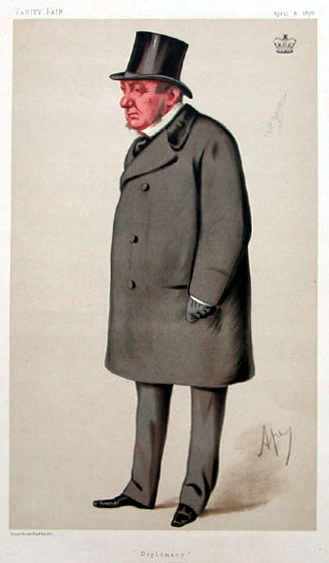
Richard Lyons, 1st Viscount Lyons caricature in Vanity Fair (April 6, 1878). Lyons's diplomatic influence is demonstrated by the subtitle used instead of his name: 'Diplomacy'.

Lyons's first major appointment commenced in December 1858, after he had succeeded to his father's title of 2nd Baron Lyons, when he succeeded Lord Napier as British Envoy to the United States in Washington. He arrived in the United States two years before the outbreak of the American Civil War. The US President James Buchanan, who was ignorant of Lyons's precocious ability, was unhappy with the appointment of Lyons, who had only a few years as a diplomat: Buchanan stated that he wanted a 'man whose character was known in this country'. Lyons considered President Buchanan to be inept and described him as ‘too weak to wring his hands’.

Lord Lyons contended that the British ‘were the chosen people of history’ but was otherwise unprejudiced to French and to Americans. He was in America ‘witty and erudite’, and ‘tactful and discreet to the point of parody, and with ‘a subtle intelligence and a steely resolve’. Lyons detested displays of emotion: Lord Newton contended that ‘he [Lyons] had never been in debt, never gambled, never quarrelled, never as far as was known, ever been in love’ and that Lyons detested exercise and sport.

Geoffrey Madan records Lyons as the author of two aphorisms:

- Americans are either wild or dull.
- If you're given champagne at lunch, there's a catch somewhere.

Lyons was reputed for his luxurious dinner parties, both when Ambassador to the United States and when Ambassador to Paris. Lyons's dinner parties ‘nothing could exceed’ in ‘dignity and faultless taste’. He agreed with Palmerston's remark that ‘dining is the soul of diplomacy’, and offered five courses of Moet and Chandon champagne to United States Senators. Lyons contended that British embassies, and consulates, and legations ought to impress Britain's grandeur by their furnishings and of their banquets, to which he often invited junior members of the diplomatic community to create the structure of ‘a boys school of which he were the headmaster’. Lyons regularly attended Willard's Hotel to discern the political opinions of American notables.

=== George Sheffield ===
Lyons's private secretary when he was British Ambassador to the USA was George Sheffield (13 September 1836 - 10 October 1898), who was the fourth son of Sir Robert Sheffield, 4th Baronet, of Normanby Hall, and who was educated at University College, Oxford, Pembroke College, Oxford, and Lincoln's Inn. Sheffield continued to serve as Lyons's private secretary for over 20 years, including when Lyons was British Ambassador to France.

=== Lyons's early American actions ===
Lord Lyons resolved during 1859 the San Juan Island crisis (the "Pig War") by advanced informal disclosure of the ultimatum that he had been instructed to deliver to the US that enabled an agreement to occur before the animosity between Britain and the US created violence.

Lyons organized the successful tour, in 1860, of British North America and the United States by the Prince of Wales, of whom he was a friend, to include the centres of Republican Party advocacy (including in New York, and in Massachusetts, and in Ohio) and to meetings with the USA's Sumner and Chase. Lord Lyons was consequently commended both by the United States, including by President Buchanan, and by Great Britain, including by Queen Victoria, by whom he was made a Knight Grand Cross of the Order of St Michael and St George (GCMG).

=== American Civil War ===
A few weeks after the Prince's tour, and subsequent to the election of Abraham Lincoln to the U.S. presidency, the animosity between the USA's slave states and free states created the Secession Crisis, in which, as he wrote in a letter to Foreign Secretary Lord John Russell, Lyons initially considered it 'impossible that the South can be mad enough to dissolve the Union'. Lyons then revised his judgement to predict an increasingly bloody conflict that would be won by the Union, but after which the Union would disintegrate as a consequence of internal animosities.

Lyons advocated British non-intervention and neutrality with both the North and the South. He considered Lincoln to be unrefined, and he thought U.S. Secretary of State William H. Seward to be abnormally prejudiced against Britain. Lyons advocated the continuous rejection of French invitations for Britain to join intervention with France. Lyons successfully resolved the defence of Canada, which he believed would be a military target for the American Union. Lyons was willing to recognise Confederate independence after Lincoln's blockade of the South's coast, and Lyons's friendship with Seward provided for the creation of what Lyons called a 'golden bridge' that would enable the Union to retract its policies against the British cotton-trade. Jenkins contends that '[Lyons thereby] avoided a collision and reached an understanding with Seward'. The Union commended Lyons's honesty, and the British Foreign Office commended Lyons as 'one of Britain's most intelligent and skilful diplomats'. Lyons believed, in the words of Jenkins, that the Union 'had to be disabused of the notion that there was no limit to his nation's [Britain's] forbearance'.

=== The Trent Affair ===
Lyons's most famous diplomatic success, whilst Ambassador to the United States, was the resolution of the Trent Affair, during the autumn of 1861, in which two politicians from the South, (James Mason and John Slidell) who had been sent to Europe to attempt to secure formal recognition for the Confederacy, were abducted from the neutral British mail steamer, Trent which was intercepted by a vessel from the Northern States. This stimulated the animosity of the British public, and war between Britain and the United States seemed imminent, but, by ‘tact and firmness’, Lyons compelled the United States government to release the two envoys to avert the conflict. Lyons achieved this by two actions: first, he withheld the official statement of the British response until after the date on which he was ordered to submit that statement, to make the Americans uncertain; second, he subsequently used the same technique that he had successfully used to resolve the San Juan Crisis, by disclosure to the Americans, without British authorization, a version of the British response that overestimated the British keenness to use force, before he stated the official British response. Queen Victoria stated that she was pleased for Lyons to ‘represent Her at any court in the world’, and that she considered Lyons to have a ‘sterling reputation for integrity’, and Raymond Jones described Lyons as ‘Britain's greatest mid-century ambassador'.

=== Lyons resigns from Washington ===
Lord Lyons in December 1864 left Washington as a consequence of insufficient health, after his final meetings with Abraham Lincoln and with Seward, both of whom wished for his return to the position of British Ambassador at Washington. However, Lyons's health subsequently deteriorated further and, in the spring of 1865, compelled Lyons to resign his Ambassadorship to the United States. Lyons refused the preference of Queen Victoria and of the British Prime Minister Lord Palmerston that he return to his post in the USA, and he nominated Sir Frederick Bruce to be his successor: which the Queen and the Prime Minister accepted. Three Volumes of Lyons's American Civil War despatches were published in 2005.

== Ambassador to Constantinople ==
Subsequent to his resignation from the Ambassadorship to the United States, Lyons served as Ambassador to the Ottoman Empire at Constantinople, for less than two years, in replacement of Sir Henry Bulwer, who had lost thousands of pounds from the Ottomans' accounts. The new Foreign Secretary, Lord Clarendon, was confident that Lord Lyons was an ‘honest man’ who would restore amicable Anglo-Ottoman relations, despite that Lyons advocated British defence of the Ottoman Empire's territory only until that defence would require British military involvement. Lyons's persuasion of the Ottoman Court of the Sublime Porte to decline concessions to France that would have provided for French control of the Suez Canal improved Britain's credibility, from which Bismarck had detracted during the crisis of Schleswig-Holstein. Lyons persuaded the French Minister to resolve the dispute over the Danubian Principalities in a manner that was conducive to British interests. Lyons subsequently was appointed to the most senior position in the British diplomatic service, which was then British Minister to France.

== Ambassador to Paris ==
The twenty years, from October 1867, in which Lyons was British Ambassador to France included the last years of the Second French Empire, the Franco-Prussian War, the Paris Commune, the establishment of the Third Republic and the beginning of the Boulanger crisis, which threatened to destroy the republican settlement. Lyons served in this position for a continuous twenty years, which made him one of its longest serving occupants, in which his political neutrality enabled him to develop amicable relationships with Liberal ministers to whose political sympathies he was averse: Jenkins contends that ‘the presence of such a reliable and conciliatory man in the most sensitive and important post in Europe gave both Liberal and Conservative British Governments an essential guarantee that their instructions would always be carried out according to the terms determined in London’. Queen Victoria stayed with Lyons in Paris. Lyons's political neutrality demonstrates that his promotion to the highest ambassadorial rank, by the British Tories, was a consequence of '[his] professional not political considerations'.

When Lyons arrived in Paris during the last months of 1867, at the height of the Paris Exhibition, the Second French Empire was stable. Lyons was entrusted by Napoleon III, but considered Napoleon's war with Prussia to be idiotic, and predicted, again correctly, that it was to culminate with the destruction of the French Empire. Lyons's correspondence provides contemporaneous commentary on the siege of Paris, and on the insurgency of the Paris Commune, and on the power of Germany, and on France's unsuccessful attempts to establish a stable polity. Lyons arranged an interview between Otto von Bismarck and M. Jules Favre that failed to resolve their dispute. During the investment of Paris, Lyons, departed for Tours, and subsequently to Bordeaux, with ministers of the French provisional government, for which Lyons was criticised in the British House of Commons, despite that Britain had recognised the Provisional Government as the veritable government. Lyons advocated the restoration of French military power to restore the balance of power on the Continent, but his actions were met with French aversion to Britain.

=== Advocacy of an entente with France and forecast of world war ===
Lord Lyons contended that democracy had been unsuccessful in France, for which favoured leaders such as Napoleon III and Léon Gambetta, whom he believed were able to organise French society and to perpetuate the France's adherence to a free-trade policy. The later years of Lyons's tenure in France included those in which the Eastern Question determined international policy; those in which France invaded Tunisia; and those in which the Egyptian Question became important. Lyons therein advocated policies that he thought would prevent a conflict between France and Germany and that would consequently perpetuate British dominance of Europe. Subsequent to the British Action in Egypt in the summer of 1882, and to the abolition of the dual rule in Egypt, Lyons was involved in a confrontation between Britain and France that lasted until 1904, in which Lyons contended that Britain ought to not withdraw from reform of Egyptian finances and from acknowledgement of French financial rights in Egypt.

Lyons's competence in France led the Prime Minister Salisbury to in 1886 offer Lyons the office of British Foreign Secretary: this was the third occasion on which Lyons was offered the office of Foreign Secretary, and for the third time, Lyons declined. Lyons, who had inherited the titles of 2nd Baronet and 2nd Baron Lyons subsequent to the death of his father in 1858, received the higher noble titles of Viscount, in 1881, and Earl, in 1887, but he died before he had been formally invested with the latter. Lyons agreed with Salisbury that he was to remain Ambassador to France until October 1887, when he was succeeded as Ambassador to France by Robert Bulwer-Lytton, 1st Earl of Lytton, who had been his Secretary.

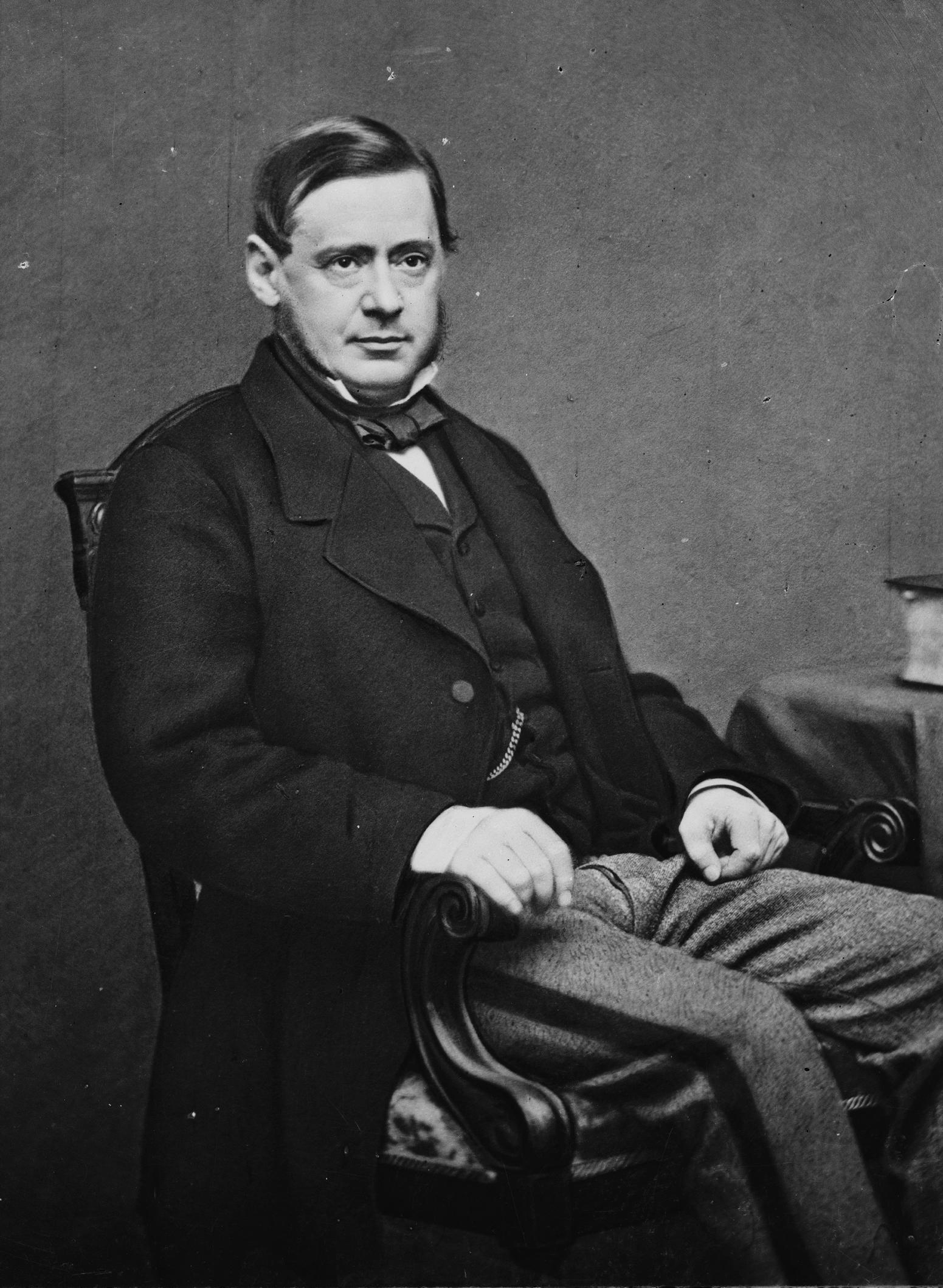
Lyons, photographed by Mathew Brady

== Retirement, death, and legacy ==
=== Controversy over supposed Conversion to Roman Catholicism ===
In 1886, Lyons's sister, Augusta Fitzalan-Howard, Duchess of Norfolk, died. Lyons had devoted the first two weeks of his retirement to the study of Catholicism, to which he had expressed his desire to convert, and he had received permission from the Prime Minister to attend Catholic Mass. Lyons had not converted to Catholicism by the time of his stroke in November 1887 that incapacitated him to the extent that ‘it is extremely doubtful to what extent he retained consciousness’: however, the Bishop of Southwark, Dr. Butt, ‘felt so convinced of his [Lyons’s] disposition and intention that he received [Lyons] into the [Catholic] Church and administered to him extreme unction’ whilst Lyons was unable to communicate. Lyons did not subsequently regain consciousness, and died on 5 December at Norfolk House, which was the residence of his nephew Duke of Norfolk.

=== Earldom, death, and burial ===
Lord Lyons died before he had formally received the title of Earl Lyons: however, because the notice of his investiture with the title of Earl had appeared in the London Gazette, he is usually termed 1st Earl Lyons, as in the Oxford Dictionary of National Biography, the Dictionary of National Biography, and the American Civil War, Round Table Profile.

Lyons did not marry and he died without issue. As a consequence of the fact that his only brother had predeceased him, also without issue, during 1855, all of his titles became extinct when he died. Richard Lyons's funeral occurred on 10 December 1887 at the Fitzalan Chapel at Arundel Castle. Queen Victoria, the Prince of Wales, Gustave de Rothschild, Alphonse James de Rothschild, and Edmond James de Rothschild sent floral tributes.

Lyons is buried under the Fitzalan Chapel, which is the burial ground of the Catholic Dukes of Norfolk. Lyons's sister, who was the Duchess of Norfolk, and her husband, the 14th Duke of Norfolk, and his father, Edmund, 1st Baron Lyons, are also buried there. Lyons left to his brother-in-law The Duke of Norfolk, and to Arundel Castle, the possessions and the decorations of his father, Edmund, 1st Baron Lyons.

== "Lyons School" of diplomacy ==
Lord Lyons's 1887 obituary in The Morning Post describes him as ‘the idea of a pattern and ideal diplomatist’ who ‘knew the contents of every modern dispatch’ ‘by heart’. Lyons's most recent biographer Jenkins (2014) considers Lyons to be the exemplar of the ‘Foreign Office mind’ who created a canon of practical norms of diplomacy, including the necessity for nominal neutrality in domestic party politics and for private correspondence with Cabinet ministers. Lyons attained the height of his influence during the premierships of his political ally the 3rd Marquess of Salisbury, who offered him the position of Foreign Secretary in 1886. In the 21st century, including by his biographer Brian Jenkins (2014), and by T. G. Otte (2011), and by Scott Thomas Cairns (2004), Lyons has been identified as a founder of a 'Lyons School' of British diplomacy that consisted of Sir Edwin Egerton; Sir Maurice de Bunsen; Sir Michael Herbert; Sir Edward Baldwin Malet; Sir Frank Lascelles; Sir Gerard Lowther; Sir Edmund Monson, 1st Baronet; and Sir Nicholas O'Conor.

=== Literary legacy ===
Lyons was the great-granduncle of the writer Maisie Ward, and the great-great-granduncle of the translator Rosemary Sheed and of the writer Wilfred Sheed.

Lyons is a minor character in the alternate history novel Guns of the South by Harry Turtledove, and in the Southern Victory Series novel The Great War: American Front by Turtledove, in which he is sent to Washington, D.C., after the Battle of Camp Hill, to advise Abraham Lincoln that the United Kingdom and the Second French Empire were to recognise and defend the Confederate States of America, after the Union was decisively defeated in battle. Lyons is also a minor character in the historical novel Freedom by William Safire.

== See also ==
- Lyons family

== Sources and further reading ==
- Langford Vere, Oliver. History of the Island of Antigua, Vol. 2. Mitchell and Hughes, London, 1894. pp. 214–217.
- Eardley-Wilmot, S. M. Lord Lyons: Life of Vice-Admiral Edmund, Lord Lyons. Sampson Low, Marston and Company,1898.
- "Richard Bickerton Pemell Lyons, 1st Viscount Lyons". Oxford Dictionary of National Biography (online ed.). Oxford University Press. 2004. doi:10.1093/ref:odnb/17292. ISBN 978-0-19-861412-8. (Subscription, Wikipedia Library access or UK public library membership required.)
- Jenkins, Brian. Lord Lyons: A Diplomat in an Age of Nationalism and War. McGill-Queen’s Press, 2014.
- "American Civil War, Round Table UK: Profile: Lord Lyons". January 2016.
- Otte, T. G. (2011). The Foreign Office Mind: The Making of British Foreign Policy: 1865–1914.
- Cairns, Scott. T. (2004). "Lord Lyons and Anglo-American Diplomacy During the American Civil War, 1859–1865"; PhD Thesis. London School of Economics.
- "Papers of Lyons, Richard Bickerton Pemell, diplomat, Viscount Lyons". The National Archives of the UK.
- "Lyons, Richard Bickerton Pemell" . Dictionary of National Biography. London: Smith, Elder & Co. 1885–1900.
- Lord Lyons: A Record of British Diplomacy vol. 1 at Project Gutenberg
- "Edmund Lyons, 1st Baron Lyons". Oxford Dictionary of National Biography (online ed.). Oxford University Press. 2004. doi:10.1093/ref:odnb/34650. (Subscription, Wikipedia Library access or UK public library membership required.)
- O’Byrne, William Richard. A Naval Biographical Dictionary, Lyons, Edmund.

== Notes ==
Diplomatic posts
Preceded by Henry Howard (pro tempore)	British Minister to Tuscany; 1858	Succeeded by Peter Campbell Scarlett
Preceded by The Lord Napier	British Minister to the United States; 1858–1865	Succeeded by Sir Frederick Bruce
Preceded by The Earl Cowley	British Ambassador to France; 1867–1887	Succeeded by The Earl of Lytton
Peerage of the United Kingdom
New creation	Viscount Lyons; 1881–1887	Extinct
Preceded by Edmund Lyons	Baron Lyons; 1858–1887	Extinct
