= Edmund Lyons =

Edmund Lyons may refer to:

- Edmund Lyons, 1st Baron Lyons (1790–1858), British naval commander and diplomat
- Edmund Moubray Lyons, British naval commander, son of the Baron

== See also ==
- Edward Lyons (disambiguation)
- Lyons (surname)
