= Augusta Louisa Lyons =

- Born: 1793
- Died: March 10, 1852; Stockholm
- Spouse: Edmund Lyons, 1st Baron Lyons
- Children: Augusta Fitzalan-Howard, Duchess of Norfolk, Anne Theresa Bickerton Lyons, Richard Lyons, Edmund Moubray Lyons
- Parents: Josias Rogers (father); Mary Ann Goodhew (mother)
- Relatives: Mary Anne Goodhew Rogers

Augusta Louisa, Lady Lyons (1793 – March 10, 1852) was a British novelist.

She was born in 1793 to Captain Josias Rogers of the Royal Navy.

In 1814, she married Sir Edmund Lyons, 1st Baronet, later the first Baron Lyons. She published three novels in the 1840s and 1850s.

She died on 10 March 1852 in Stockholm, where her husband was posted as a diplomat.

== Family ==
She and her husband had four children:

- Richard Bickerton Pemell Lyons, 1st Earl, 1st Viscount, and 2nd Baron Lyons (1817-1887)
- Anna Theresa Bickerton Lyons, married Philipp Hartmann Veit Baron von Würtzburg (1815-1894)
- Edmund Mowbray Lyons, Captain in the Royal Navy, killed during the Crimean War (1819-1855)
- Augusta Mary Minna Catherine Lyons, married Henry Fitzalan-Howard, 14th Duke of Norfolk (1821-1886)

== Bibliography ==
- Olivia: A Tale for an Hour of Idleness. 1 vol. London: Simms and M'Intyre, 1848.
- Sir Philip Hetherington: A Tale for an Hour of Idleness. 1 vol. London: Simms and M'Intyre, 1852.
- The Lover upon Trial. 1 vol. London: Simms and M'Intyre, 1853.
