= Kate Chase =

American socialite (1840–1899)

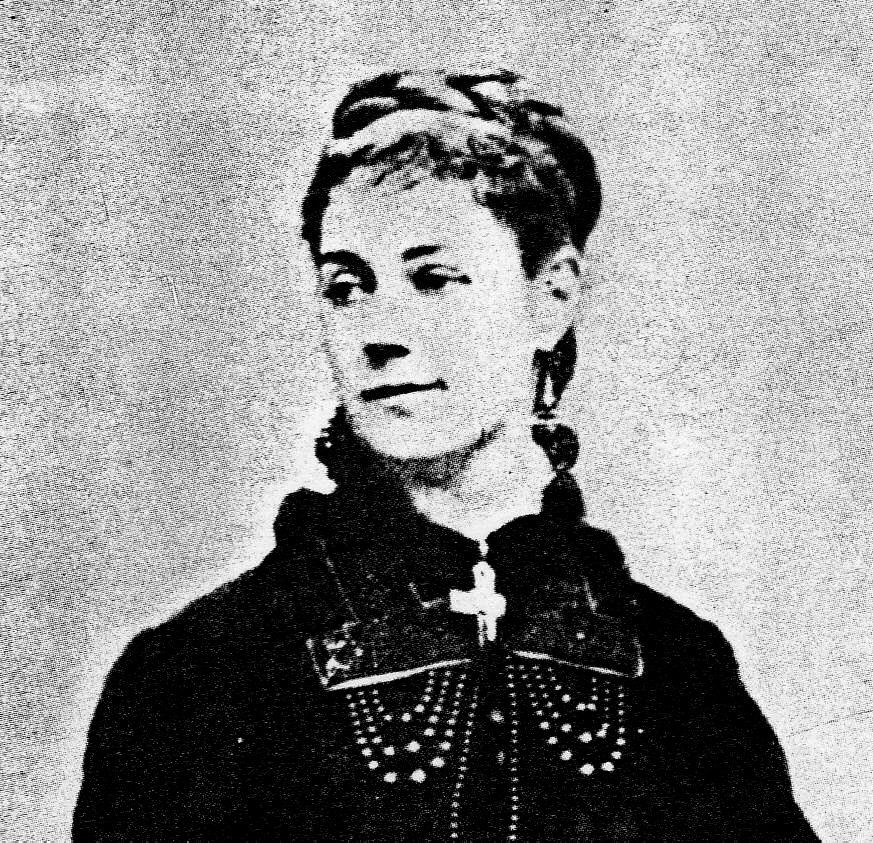
- Chase in 1873
- Born: Katherine Jane Chase; August 13, 1840; Cincinnati, Ohio, U.S.
- Died: July 31, 1899 (aged 58); Washington, D.C., U.S.
- Occupations: Socialite; political adviser
- Spouse: William Sprague IV (m. 1863; div. 1882)
- Children: 4

Katherine Jane Chase Sprague (August 13, 1840 – July 31, 1899) was an American socialite and Washington society hostess during the American Civil War. During the war, she married Rhode Island Governor William Sprague.

She was the daughter of Ohio politician Salmon P. Chase, who served as Treasury Secretary during President Abraham Lincoln's first administration and later Chief Justice of the United States. She was a strong supporter of her widowed father's presidential ambitions that, had he been successful, would have made her acting First Lady.

== Early life ==
Kate was born in Cincinnati, Ohio, the daughter of Salmon Chase and his second wife, Eliza Ann Smith. Eliza Chase died shortly after Kate's fifth birthday; Chase later married Sara Bella Ludlow, with whom Kate had a difficult relationship.

Kate Chase was educated at the Haines School in New York City, where she learned languages, elocution and the social graces along with music and history. After nine years of schooling, she returned to Columbus, Ohio, to serve as official hostess for her father, the newly elected Governor of Ohio, and by now widowed a third time. Beautiful and intelligent, Kate impressed such friends of her father as Charles Sumner, a Massachusetts senator and fellow anti-slavery champion; future President James Garfield; and Carl Schurz, a German-born American politician, who described her as follows:

She was about eighteen years old, tall and slender and exceedingly well formed. . . . Her little nose, somewhat audaciously tipped up, could perhaps not have passed muster with a severe critic, but it fitted pleasingly into her face with its large, languid, but at the same time vivacious hazel eyes, shaded by long dark lashes and arched over by proud eyebrows. The fine forehead was framed in waving, gold-brown hair. She had something imperial in the pose of the head, and all her movements possessed an exquisite natural charm. No wonder that she came to be admired as a great beauty and broke many hearts. After the usual commonplaces, the conversation at the breakfast table, in which Miss Kate took a lively and remarkably intelligent part, soon turned itself upon politics.

== Life in Washington ==
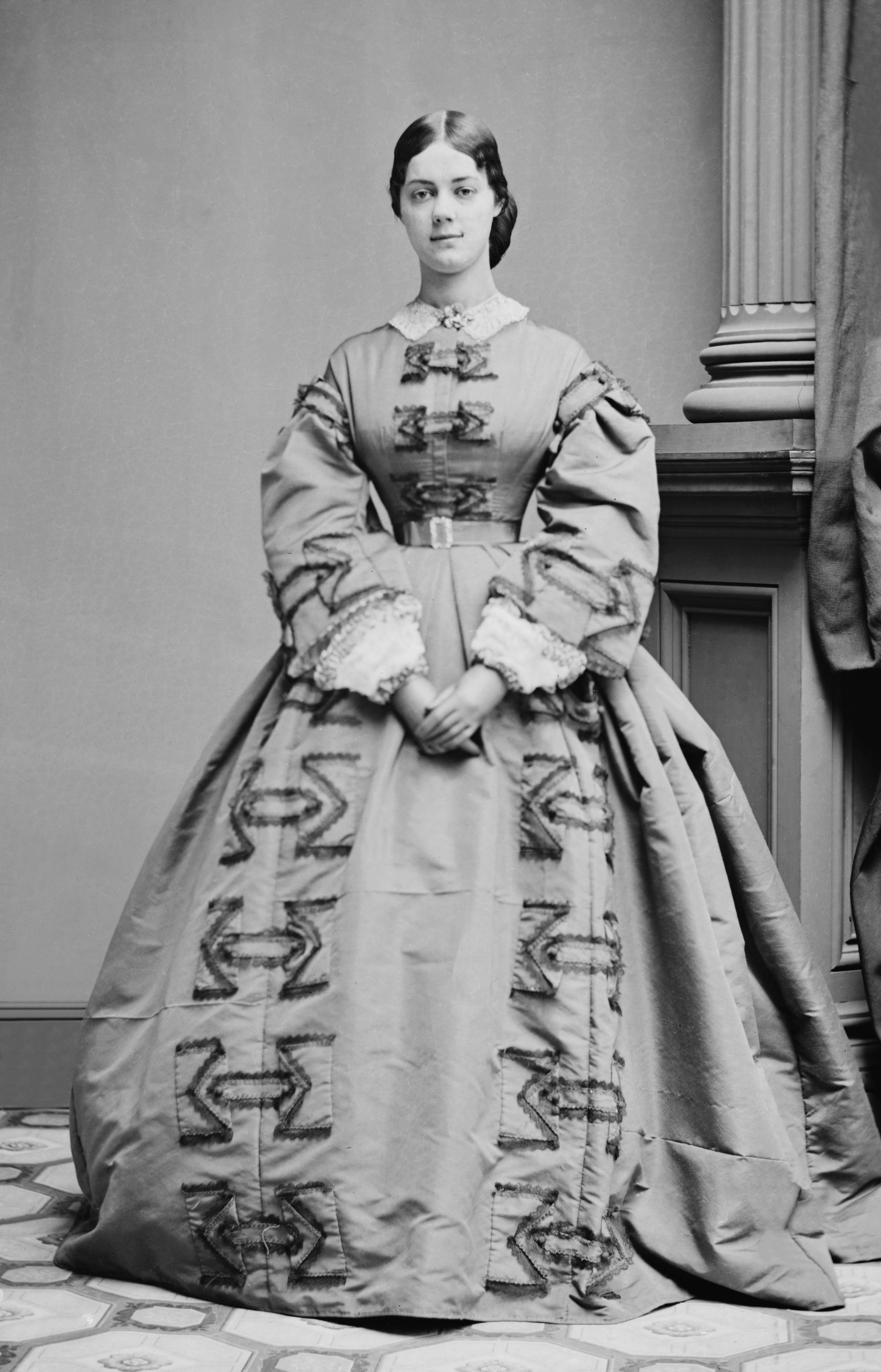
Kate Chase, circa 1861

Union General John Joseph Abercrombie and Kate Chase Sprague, circa 1863

In 1861, Salmon P. Chase became Secretary of the Treasury in Lincoln's administration. He set up residence at 6th and E Streets Northwest in Washington, with Kate Chase as his hostess. Her soirees were eagerly attended in the nation's capital; she became, effectively, the "Belle of the North." She visited battle camps in the Washington area and befriended Union generals, offering her own views on the proper prosecution of the war, often contrary to the wishes of the administration.

== Marriage and divorce ==
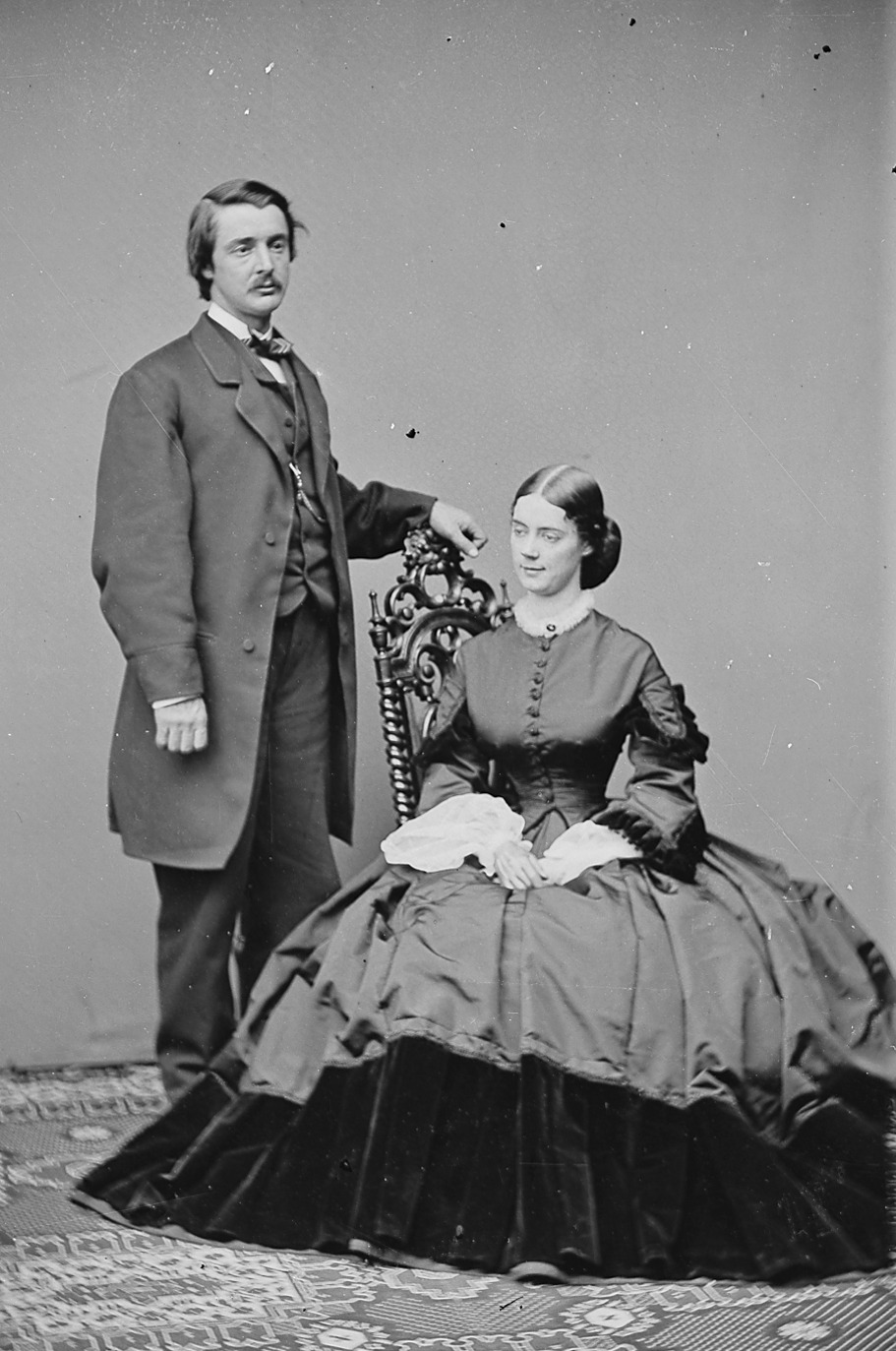
Kate and William Sprague

Chase married former Governor of Rhode Island and that state's current U.S. Senator William Sprague, a textile magnate, on November 12, 1863. Fifty people were invited to the ceremony, which took place in the parlor of the mansion where she lived with her father. The guests included President Abraham Lincoln and his entire cabinet (with the exception of Montgomery Blair, who refused to attend) senators, governors, generals, diplomats, and select congressmen. An additional 500 people were invited to the reception which followed. Lincoln's wife, Mary Todd Lincoln, who strongly disliked both Chases, did not attend.

Sprague's wedding gift to her was a tiara of matched pearls and diamonds that cost more than $50,000. As the bride entered the room, the U.S. Marine Band played "The Kate Chase March" that composer Thomas Mark Clark had written for the occasion.

There was much speculation in Washington leading up to the wedding – and by historians afterward – that Kate's attraction to Sprague may have been monetary, as her father was losing money by serving as Treasury Secretary, and had a burning desire to be President, which required sufficient funds to mount a campaign. Sprague was not educated, having left school early to join the family business, and was small, thin and not particularly attractive by the standards of the day. He was, however, very rich.

Chase and Sprague had four children: William "Willie" (b. 1865), Ethel (b. 1869), Catherine (b. 1872) and Portia (b. 1873). Sprague had problems with alcohol, had affairs with other women, and lost huge sums of money in poorly conceived business ventures. Some evidence suggests that he engaged in illegal cotton trading during the war.

Sprague financially backed Salmon Chase's unsuccessful efforts to secure support to become the 1864 Republican presidential nominee. However, he would no longer provide such support to her father's political ambitions after this.

During the 1868 impeachment trial of President Andrew Johnson, presided over by Chase's father, as Chief Justice of the Supreme Court, Sprague kept his intentions to himself, but ended up voting with most Republican senators for conviction. This may have furthered his rift with Kate, whose father's chances for the 1868 Republican presidential nomination would have been damaged had Johnson been removed from office. Next in line to the Presidency, under the law at the time, was Benjamin Wade, the radical Republican President pro tempore of the U.S. Senate, who could then have run as an incumbent. Johnson was acquitted by a single vote.

The marriage ended in divorce in 1882. Before the divorce, Kate was accused of having an affair with the flamboyant and powerful US Senator Roscoe Conkling from New York. According to a well-known story, buttressed by contemporaneous press reports, Sprague confronted the philandering couple at Sprague's Rhode Island summer home and pursued Conkling with a shotgun and threatened to throw Kate out of a second story window. The shotgun incident with Conkling happened in 1879, but Kate had been suspected of infidelities at least 10 years earlier. According to Salmon Chase biographer John Niven, "Whether [Kate's second] child...was Sprague's or had been conceived with another is a matter of speculation". Kate sued for divorce and won her release from the marriage.

Willie Sprague continued to live with his father, while the daughters went with Kate Chase, who took back her maiden name after the divorce. Willie died at age 25 in a Seattle boarding house. He had already been through one marriage and divorce. His wife gave birth to a child of questionable lineage only six months after they were married.

== Political action ==
Kate worked behind the scenes to foster her father's calculated efforts to wrest the 1864 Republican Party nomination for president from Lincoln, but the plot blew up in Chase's face when it became public, requiring Chase to settle back into his Treasury Secretary position. One of Chase's many perfunctory offers of resignation from the Cabinet was accepted by Lincoln (much to Chase's surprise and consternation) in 1864, but the President appointed him Chief Justice of the Supreme Court upon the death of Roger Taney later that year. The evidence conflicts as to whether Kate welcomed this prestigious appointment or rued it as an attempt to put her father "on the shelf" so as to preempt any hope of his attaining his most-cherished ambition for the highest office in the land.

Despite his position on the Supreme Court, Chase let it be known in 1868 that he was available as a candidate for the Presidency. He switched parties from the Republicans (of whom he had been an important early member) to the Democrats, hoping they would nominate him. In the summer of 1868, Kate ran her father's campaign for the Democratic nomination from their Fifth Avenue hotel suites in New York City, where the convention was being held in Tammany Hall. Although tradition prevented her appearance, as a woman, on the convention floor, she did much of the back-room maneuvering with the goal of winning the nomination after the first ballot. At times the prize seemed within their grasp, but the convention ended up nominating Horatio Seymour, the Democratic Governor of New York, whom Kate and other Chase operatives had been counting on to place her father's name in nomination. Kate placed the blame for the defeat on a conspiracy of New York politicians including Samuel Tilden.

Kate wrote her father after the convention, "You have been most cruelly deceived and shamefully used by the man [Tilden] whom you trusted implicitly and the country must suffer for his duplicity." Kate would reputedly have her revenge on Tilden eight years later when her paramour Conkling, the most powerful member of the Senate, maneuvered to throw the disputed 1876 election to the Republican Rutherford B. Hayes over the Democrat Tilden, who had won the popular vote.

Chase would make one final bid for the presidency in 1872, with Kate's full support, but by then he was physically weakened and a political has-been; he ran as a Liberal Republican, challenging the incumbent Ulysses S. Grant. The effort went nowhere and Chase died a year later, with Kate and Sprague, her divorced husband, at his bedside.

== Later years ==
In 1873, following her father's death, Kate moved onto the "Edgewood" estate, which later became the neighborhood of Edgewood, Washington, D.C.; her father had purchased the bulk of the estate in 1863 and constructed a mansion on it. She lived a very quiet life with her three daughters (according to the 1880 federal census), Ethel, Kitty, and Portia Sprague. After her son Willie committed suicide in 1890, at the age of 25, Kate became a recluse. She eventually lost her fortune and, to get by, resorted to raising chickens, growing vegetables and selling them door to door. She died in poverty in 1899, at age 58, of Bright's disease and was buried at Spring Grove Cemetery in Cincinnati, Ohio.

On her death, The New York Times wrote that "the homage of the most eminent men in the country was hers." The Washington Post called her "the most brilliant woman of her day. None outshone her." The Cincinnati Enquirer, the paper of her birthplace, said about her funeral:

Hardly more than two or three—and they the nearest relatives on earth—were gathered together yesterday morning around the new-made grave in Spring Grove Cemetery, where, with the simple ceremony of commitment—"Dust to dust, ashes to ashes"—the mortal remains of the daughter of Salmon P. Chase were laid to rest forever beside the dust of her illustrious father.

And yet, The Enquirer recognized her legacy: "No Queen has ever reigned under the Stars and Stripes, but this remarkable woman came closer to being Queen than any American woman has."

== In popular culture ==
Kate Chase's presence in Washington, D.C. would be fictionally recreated in the 1990s TV series The Secret Diary of Desmond Pfeiffer. She is prominent in both Gore Vidal's historical novel Lincoln and William Safire's Freedom and is portrayed by Deborah Adair in the 1988 made-for-TV movie of Vidal's book. Chase has also been featured in other Civil War-related novels, such as Stephen L. Carter's The Impeachment of Abraham Lincoln. She was the principal character in the 1967 two-act play "Kate Chase" by Jack LaZebnik.

Chase is also a character in In This Moment, the third book in the "Timeless" series by Gabrielle Meyer. Her affair with Conkling is depicted in the 2025 Netflix limited series Death by Lightning, where she is portrayed by Tuppence Middleton.

Our American Queen: The Rise and Ruin of Kate Chase – The Most Powerful American Woman You’ve Never Heard Of by Thomas Klingenstnein will be performed at London's Bridewell Theatre in early 2026.
