= Richard Lyons =

Richard Lyons may refer to:

- Richard Lyons (Warden of the Mint) (1310–1381), royal councillor who was imprisoned by the Good Parliament in 1376 on suspicion of embezzlement
- Richard Lyons, 1st Viscount Lyons (1817–1887), British diplomat
- Richard Lyons (writer) (1920–2000), American poet, and Professor of English
- Richard Lyons (mathematician) (born 1945), American mathematician, specializing in finite group theory. Namesake of the Lyons group
- Dicky Lyons (born 1947), former American football player
- Rich Lyons (born 1961), American academic and Dean of the Haas School of Business, UC Berkeley
- Richard Lyons (racing driver) (born 1979), British racing car driver
- Richard Lyons (poet) (fl. 1984 – present), American poet and teacher
- Richard J. Lyons (1895–1959), American lawyer and politician

== See also ==
- Richard Lyon (disambiguation)
