= Frank G. Carver =

Frank Gould Carver
- Born: May 27, 1928; Crookston, Nebraska
- Died: July 14, 2017 (aged 89)
- Occupations: Biblical scholar and professor
- Known for: Translator on the New American Standard Bible (both 1971 and 1995)

Academic background
- Education: Taylor University, Nazarene Theological Seminary, University of Edinburgh (Ph.D.)
- Thesis: Concept of Koinonia in the New Testament, its basis background and development (1964)

Academic work
- Discipline: Biblical studies
- Sub-discipline: New Testament studies
- Institutions: Point Loma Nazarene University
- Notable works: 2 Corinthians: A Commentary in the Wesleyan Tradition

Frank Gould Carver (May 27, 1928 – July 14, 2017) was an American scholar and professor of Biblical theology and Greek.

Carver was born in Crookston, Nebraska to Frank Alonzo and Greeta (née Gould). He earned his B.A. (1950) from Taylor University, his B.D. (1954) and Th.M. (1958) from Nazarene Theological Seminary, and his Ph.D. on the concept of koinonia (1964) from the University of Edinburgh. Carver was one of only three scholars who worked on both the original 1971 translation of the New American Standard Bible as well as the 1995 update. He served as professor emeritus at Point Loma Nazarene University from 1996.

== Selected publications ==
=== Books ===
- Carver, Frank G. (1973). The Cross and the Spirit: Peter and the Way of the Holy. Beacon Hill Press of Kansas City. ISBN 0-8341-1094-6.
- ——— (1971). Peter the Rock-Man. Anderson, IN: Warner Press. ISBN 0-8341-0156-4. OCLC 926756714.
- ——— (1996). When Jesus Said Goodbye: John's Witness to the Holy Spirit. Kansas City, KS: Beacon Hill Press. ISBN 0-8341-1570-0. OCLC 33983448.
- ———; Stevenson, Margaret (2001). Remembering: pursuing the call. Centennial Monograph Series. Vol. 1. San Diego, CA: Point Loma Press. ISBN 9780834110946. OCLC 48411977.
- ——— (2006). Matthew Part 1: To Be a Disciple. Beacon Small Group Bible Study Series. Kansas City, KS: Beacon Hill Press. ISBN 0-8341-0870-4.
- ——— (2009). 2 Corinthians: A Commentary in the Wesleyan Tradition. New Beacon Bible Commentary series. Kansas City, KS: Beacon Hill Press. ISBN 978-0-8341-2396-0.

=== Edited by ===
- Corlett, Lewis T. (1992). ——— (ed.). Thank God and take courage : how the Holy Spirit worked in my life. San Diego, CA: Point Loma Press. ISBN 9780834110946. OCLC 26023273.

=== Chapters ===
- ——— (1995). "Nature of Biblical Prophecy". In Dunning, H. Ray (ed.). The Second Coming: a Wesleyan approach to the doctrine of Last Things. Kansas City, KS: Beacon Hill Press. ISBN 9780834115255. OCLC 466929554.
- ——— (1993). "The Sacrifice that Sanctifies (Hebrews 10:11-18)". In Dunning, H. Ray (ed.). Biblical Resources for Holiness Preachinq: From Text to Sermon. Vol. 2. Kansas City, KS: Beacon Hill Press. ISBN 9780834114654. OCLC 814451153.
- ——— (1993). "Through and through Sanctification (1 Thess. 5:23-24)". In Dunning, H. Ray (ed.). Biblical Resources for Holiness Preaching: From Text to Sermon. Vol. 2. Kansas City, KS: Beacon Hill Press. ISBN 9780834114654. OCLC 814451153.

=== Journal articles ===
- ——— (Fall 1987). "Biblical foundations for the "Secondness" of Entire Sanctification". WTJ. 22: 7–23.
- ——— (June–August 1991). "Some Thoughts on Biblical Preaching From a 'Purist' Professor of Bible". The Preacher's Magazine. 67 (4): 17–19.
- ——— (June–August 1996). "The Essence of Wesleyanism". The Preacher's Magazine. 71 (4).
- ——— (1999). "Growth in Sanctification: John Wesley and John of the Cross". The Tower: The Journal of Nazarene Theological Seminary. 3: 33–70.

Note: For access to many of Frank Carver's personal documents, notes, and publications, see The Frank G. Carver Archive.
