= George Lyons =

George Lyons may refer to:

- George Lyons (footballer) (1884–?), English footballer
- George Lyons (born Dominick George Martoccio; 1889–1958), American musician, harpist and composer, part of Lyons and Yosco
- George Lyons (baseball) (1891–1981), American professional baseball pitcher
- George Lyons (footballer, born 1935), (1935-2017), English footballer, see List of Rochdale A.F.C. players (25–99 appearances)
- George Lyons (theologian) (born 1947), American author and professor of New Testament studies

== See also ==
- George Lyon (disambiguation)
- Lyons (surname)
