= William M. Greathouse =

American Christian minister (1919–2011)

William Marvin Greathouse (April 29, 1919 – March 24, 2011) was a minister and emeritus general superintendent in the Church of the Nazarene. He was born in Van Buren, Arkansas.

Greathouse served as a pastor in the Church of the Nazarene from 1938 until 1963 when he was elected president of Trevecca Nazarene College in Nashville, Tennessee; he served until 1968. At that time he was elected president of Nazarene Theological Seminary in Kansas City, Missouri. He served there until 1976, when he was elected General Superintendent of the Church of the Nazarene. He retired from this position in 1989.

He is the namesake of the William M. Greathouse Chair of Wesleyan-Holiness Theology at Nazarene Theological Seminary.

He attended Lambuth College, Trevecca Nazarene College, and Vanderbilt University for doctoral studies.

== Partial list of books by William M. Greathouse ==
- The Fullness of the Spirit, 1958, Nazarene Publishing House
- From the Apostles to Wesley: Christian Perfection in Historical Perspective 1979 by Beacon Hill Press, reprinted 2002 by Schmul Publishing. (ISBN 0-88019-442-1)
- Wholeness in Christ: Toward a Biblical Theology of Holiness, 1998 by Beacon Hill Press. (ISBN 0-8341-1702-9)
- An Introduction to Wesleyan Theology with H. Ray Dunning, 1982 by Beacon Hill Press. (ISBN 0-8341-0762-7)
- Exploring Christian Holiness volume 2 The Historical Development with Paul M. Bassett, 1985 by Beacon Hill Press (ISBN 0-8341-0926-3) for the book and (ISBN 0-8341-0842-9) for the set.
- Contributor to the Beacon Bible Commentary for the Bible books of Zechariah and Malachi (volume 5), 1966 and the book of Romans (volume 8), 1968, published by Beacon Hill Books.
- New Beacon Bible Commentary: Romans 1-8 with George Lyons, 2008 by Beacon Hill Press. (ISBN 0-8341-2362-2)
- New Beacon Bible Commentary: Romans 9-16 with George Lyons, 2008 by Beacon Hill Press. (ISBN 0-8341-2363-0)
