= Peter Lyons =

Peter Lyons may refer to:

- Peter B. Lyons (fl. 1960s–2010s), U.S. Assistant Secretary of Energy for Nuclear Energy
- Peter Lyons Collister (born 1956), American cinematographer
- Peter Lyons (Virginia judge) (c. 1734–1809), judge of the Virginia Court of Appeals
- Peter Lyons (Queensland judge) (born 1946), justice of the Supreme Court of Queensland
- Peter Stanley Lyons (1927–2006), English choral musician and headmaster

== See also ==
- Peter Lyon (born 1941), Australian rules footballer
