= Marcia Bricker Halperin =

Photographer of New York City

Marcia Bricker Halperin (b. 1953) is a photographer who has specialized in photographing Brooklyn and Brooklynites as well as locations in other boroughs of New York City.

== Career ==
Bricker Halperin has photographed the Brooklyn landscape, as well as other parts of New York City, since the 1970s. She was inspired by street photographers, such as Helen Levitt. In 1978, she was selected to be a part of the federally funded Comprehensive Employment and Training Act (CETA) Artists Project, as implemented in Manhattan. As part of the CETA program, she produced multiple photograph series, including Hell’s Kitchen in the 1970s (in coordination with Housing Conservation Coordinators). Her efforts helped a project involving tenant organizers in that Manhattan neighborhood. She photographed apartments that landlords had neglected. Tenants and their advocates used these photographs to help the tenants (and homesteaders) win lawsuits against landlords.

In the late 1970s and in the 1980s, and again in the 2020s, she photographed Soviet-era and later immigrants to Brighton Beach, Brooklyn. As recently as 2022, in about 35% of the households in the neighborhood, nicknamed "Little Odessa", the primary language was Russian or Ukrainian. She was interested in the interactions between the established Jewish community and newer Soviet Jewish immigrants.

Bricker Halperin also documented a number of cafeterias in the city. Writing in 2017 for The New York Times, David Gonzalez noted that "Her record of New York’s long-gone cafeterias, rendered in black and white, have graceful architecture, dazzling or moody lighting and more than a few characters, like Gene Palma, the slick-haired street drummer and Gene Krupa maven" (Palma was featured in Taxi Driver).

She photographed Dubrow's in Brooklyn and in Manhattan's Garment District, the Concord Cafeteria in Miami Beach, the Paradise Cafeteria (on West 23rd Street and Eighth Avenue in Manhattan), and the Art Deco Horn & Hardart of West 57th Street (between Sixth and Seventh Avenues in Manhattan). Christopher Porter characterized her photographs this way:

While Hopper's Nighthawks represents that spectrum of "liveliness and sorrow of urban life" all in one painting — based on my interpretation, anyway — Halperin generally captures one or the other emotions in her photos, not both simultaneously.

In addition to cafeterias, Bricker Halperin photographed such subject matter as public markets and Hasidim. She photographed New York City's public markets, including La Marqueta in East Harlem on Park Avenue between 111th and 116th Streets under the Metro North train tracks and the Essex Street Market on the Lower East Side. In addition, she produced a series of photos of Hasidim celebrating Jewish holidays at Coney Island.

She had a career as a high school photography and special education teacher in New York City. During her 35 years as a teacher, her photography largely fell by the wayside. However, she noted in 2023, "the day after I retired, I took out my negatives and my photography stuff and bought a scanner and all kinds of printers and things", and returned to photography.

=== Kibbitz & Nosh ===
Bricker Halperin's 2023 photobook Kibbitz & Nosh: When We All Met at Dubrow's Cafeteria includes many of her photographs of the Dubrow's on Kings Highway and East 16th Street in Brooklyn. The book documents the lives of the mainly elderly Jews who frequented the cafeteria. Julia Gergely, writing for the Jewish Telegraphic Agency, underlined the importance of Bricker Halperin's preserving the memory of a vanished world of secular Jewish culture.

Bricker Halperin began frequenting the Dubrow’s on Kings Highway in 1975 and continued until it closed in 1978, and was a regular visitor to the Garment District's Dubrow's until its closure in 1985. The book includes essays about Dubrow's by several people, including the playwright Donald Margulies and historian Deborah Dash Moore.

=== Exhibitions ===
In 2020, before the publication of her book Kibbitz and Nosh, the University of Michigan's Institute for Research on Women and Gender, the Women’s Studies Department, the Jean and Samuel Frankel Center for Judaic Studies, and the Department of American Culture organized an exhibition of Bricker Halperin's photographs of vanished cafeterias. In 2023, photographs from the book were exhibited at the Edward Hopper House in Nyack, NY.

=== Awards and nominations ===
Bricker Halperin was a finalist for the Lucie Foundation's 2022 photography award in the "Linked Generations" category. Her photographs included several that became part of her book. Bricker Halperin, in 2024, won the Jewish Book Council's Jane and Stuart Weitzman Family Award for Food Writing and Cookbooks for Kibbitz and Nosh.

== Personal life ==
Halperin is a lifelong resident of Brooklyn. As a child, she attended a "Conservadox" synagogue, and had "the kind of family where my mother kept a kosher kitchen at home, but on Sunday nights we’d go out to the Chinese restaurant." She earned a bachelor's degree and a Master of Fine Arts, both from Brooklyn College.
