= Dubrow's Cafeteria =

Defunct chain of cafeteria-style restaurants

Dubrow’s was a family-owned chain of cafeteria-style restaurants in Manhattan, Brooklyn, and Miami Beach. In 1929, Benjamin Dubrow (né Mowsoha Bencian Dubrowensky), an immigrant from Minsk in what is now Belarus, established the first Dubrow's on the Lower East Side of Manhattan. Benjamin was married to Rose Solowey, also from Belarus. They had five children: George, Minnie, Lila, Sylvia and Ruth.

George (who married Fannie Feldman and had three children: Irwin, Helene, and Leonard), together with his brothers in law, Max Tobin (who married Minnie and had three children: Sheila, Paul, and Anita), Benjamin Adler (who married Lila and had two sons: Joseph and Robert), Irving Kaplan (who married Sylvia and had three daughters: Beth Wald, Bonnie Lyons, and Laura Levin) and their descendants went on to establish and operate four new cafeterias and bakeries, three restaurants, a take-out shop, and Toby’s, a southern-style chain of cafeterias in Florida. Ruth, George’s youngest sister, who married Seymour Gruber, a physician, had three children, Michael, Steven, and Joanne.

When George Dubrow died in an automobile accident in Florida, his eldest son Irwin assumed his responsibilities in managing Dubrow’s. Irwin’s brother Leonard subsequently joined him. In the following years, Paul Tobin took over for his father, and Joseph and Robert Adler worked part-time with their father. Irving Kaplan stayed with Dubrow’s until the last location’s closing.

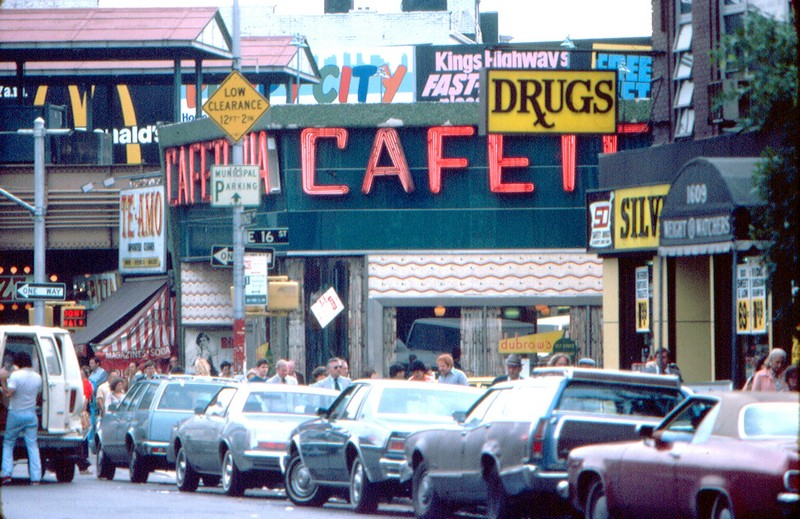
Kings Highway & E.16 (c. 1977)

Dubrow's was a New York City landmark for many decades with restaurants in both Manhattan and Brooklyn and later in Miami Beach.

There were two Dubrow’s Cafeterias in Brooklyn, one on Kings Highway at the corner of East 16th Street and one on Eastern Parkway near Utica Avenue. The cafeteria in Miami Beach was on Lincoln Road. The Manhattan Dubrow's was an important part of New York's Garment District in the early- to mid-twentieth century. It was a hub of activity for the International Ladies' Garment Workers' Union.

Many politicians used both the Brooklyn and the Manhattan locations as stumping spots for their political campaigns. These included Presidents John F. Kennedy and Jimmy Carter. Among the other politicians who were running for office and made campaign stops at Dubrow's were Robert F. Kennedy. New York gubernatorial candidates who campaigned at Dubrow's included Hugh Carey and W. Averell Harriman. According to multiple biographies, baseball player Sandy Koufax announced his decision to sign with the Brooklyn Dodgers in front of Dubrow's Cafeteria on Kings Highway in Brooklyn. The children's author Bruce Coville also wrote about working at Dubrow's for a brief period. The Manhattan Dubrow's was the site of the American Playhouse production of The Cafeteria, which was based on the short story with the same name by Isaac Bashevis Singer. The production was broadcast on PBS.

The Dubrow's on Kings Highwary closed in 1978. The last Dubrow's, in Manhattan's Garment District, closed in 1985.

In 2023, Three Hills (a division of Cornell University Press) published Marcia Bricker Halperin's book containing a collection of her photographs of Dubrow's. The book includes essays about Dubrow's by several people including the playwright Donald Margulies.

== Dubrow's Cafeteria in popular culture ==
- Dubrow's is the backdrop to campaigning by Richard Nixon in a photograph by Garry Winogrand, Kennedy–Nixon Presidential Campaign, New York, 1960.
- The novel Subway Music by Reynold Junker includes a nostalgic passage about Dubrow's being gone
- The poem "Waitress" by Jason Shinder claims to be set in Dubrow's, though there were no waitresses in Dubrow's.
- The poem "You Could Live If They Let You" by Wallace Markfield includes the lines "As I might speak of e. e. cummings enormous room or Swann's Madeline you speak of Dubrow's Cafeteria and Mallomars."
- Ivan Koota did several paintings of Dubrow's in his collection of works depicting his native Brooklyn.
- Dennis Ziemienski has a painting of Dubrow's Cafeteria.
- Parts of the 1979 film Boardwalk were filmed on location in the Dubrow's Cafeteria, Kings Highway & E.16, shortly after it closed, pictured above, in this article.
- The novel Revolutionaries by Joshua Furst references a character who is married to Abby Hoffman scrounging for food at Dubrow's in Manhattan.
