= Edward Lyons =

Edward Lyons may refer to:

- Edward Lyons (British politician) (1926–2010), member of parliament
- Edward F. Lyons Jr. (1899–1990), World War II veteran who supported the prosecution of German war criminals
- Edward H. Lyons (1855–1920), American businessman, farmer, and politician
- Eddie Lyons (1886–1926), film actor, director and screenwriter
- Eddie Lyons (footballer) (1920–1996), English footballer
- Ed Lyons (1923–2009), American baseball player
- Ned Lyons (c. 1839–1906), Irish-American gangster

== See also ==
- Ed Lyon, British tenor
- Edward E. Lyon (1871–1931), Medal of Honor recipient
- Edmund Lyons (disambiguation)
- Lyons (surname)
