= Edmund Moubray Lyons =

British naval officer (1819–1855)

Captain Edmund Moubray Lyons
- Born: 27 October 1819
- Died: 23 June 1855 (aged 35)
- Relatives: Captain John Lyons of Antigua (grandfather); Edmund Lyons, 1st Baron Lyons (father); Vice-Admiral John Lyons (uncle); Richard Lyons, 1st Viscount Lyons (brother); Anne Theresa Bickerton Lyons (sister), Baroness von Würtzburg; Augusta Mary Minna Catherine Lyons (sister), 14th Duchess of Norfolk; Sir Algernon Lyons, Admiral of the Fleet (first cousin)
- Military career
- Allegiance: United Kingdom
- Branch: Royal Navy
- Service years: 1829–1855
- Rank: Captain
- Commands: HMS Pilot; HMS Miranda
- Conflicts: First Opium War; Crimean War

Captain Edmund Moubray Lyons (27 October 1819 – 23 June 1855) was an officer of the Royal Navy. He was fatally wounded whilst commanding HMS Miranda in the Crimean War.

== Early life ==
Edmund Lyons was born on 27 October 1819. He was the second son of Edmund Lyons, 1st Baron Lyons, and Augusta Louisa (née Rogers). He was named after Captain Hussey Moubray of the Royal Navy, under whom his father had served. His elder brother, whom he predeceased, was the diplomat Richard Lyons, 1st Viscount Lyons.

== Royal Navy career ==
=== Early career ===
Edmund entered the Royal Naval College on 10 July 1829. He passed his examinations in 1838, and went out to the Far East where he served during the First Opium War. He was present at the operations at Bocca Tigris, seeing action at the Battle of the Bogue and the Battle of Canton. For his good service he was promoted to lieutenant on 10 June 1841. He was then appointed as an additional lieutenant aboard the 120-gun HMS Howe, then serving in the Mediterranean. Howe was at this time under the command of Captain Robert Smart, as the flagship of Francis Mason, then the second-in-command of the Mediterranean Fleet. From Howe Lyons moved to the 92-gun HMS Rodney on 1 March 1842, then under the command of Captain Robert Maunsell.

Lyons' next ship was the 110-gun HMS Queen, which he joined on 11 January 1844 as an additional lieutenant. Queen was at this time in the Mediterranean as the flagship of Vice-Admiral Sir Edward Owen, and was commanded by John Baker Porter Hay. Lyons's time aboard Queen was short-lived, he was appointed to the 24-gun HMS Aigle, under Captain Lord Clarence Paget, on 15 April 1844. Lyons joined the 26-gun HMS Tyne on 19 June 1845 and served under Captain William Nugent Glascock. He was then appointed as first lieutenant of the 16-gun HMS Siren, under Captain Harry Edmund Edgell, on 10 April 1846. He was promoted to commander on 9 November 1846.

=== Command ===
Lyons then took command of his first ship, the 16-gun HMS Pilot, on 7 June 1848 and served in the East Indies. He was promoted to captain on 4 October 1849, and then took command of the wooden screw sloop HMS Miranda on her commissioning at Sheerness on 25 February 1854. He served initially in the White Sea during the Crimean War as part of Sir Erasmus Ommanney's squadron, but then was sent to the Black Sea.

=== Death and Memorial ===
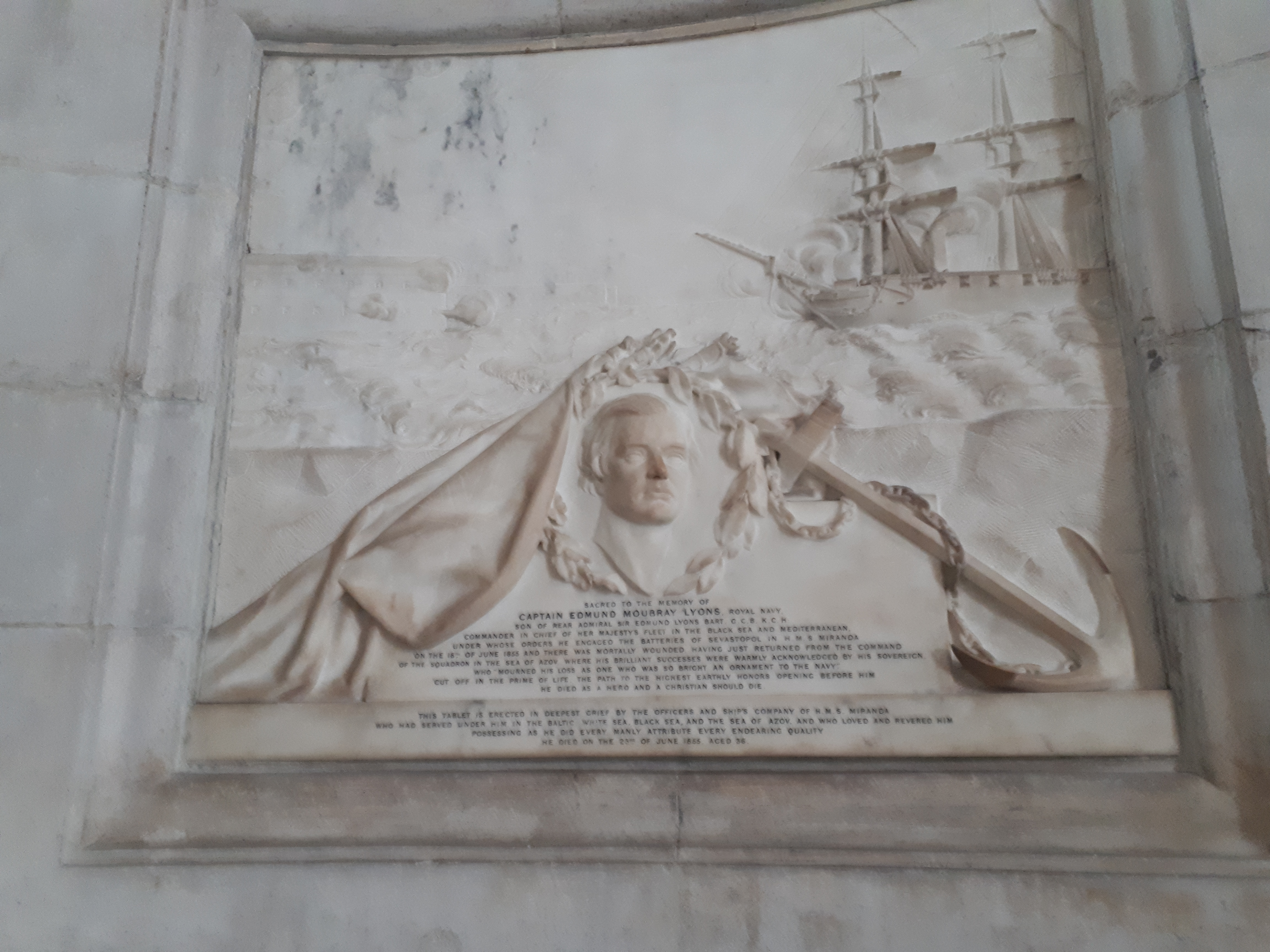
Memorial to Captain Lyons by Matthew Noble in St. Paul's Cathedral

Whilst commanding HMS Miranda on 17 June 1855, Lyons was killed in action during the Crimean War in a night attack on Fort Constantine, in which he was fatally wounded by a piece of shell that embedded itself in his left leg. He died, without issue, in the hospital of Therapia.

The British Black Sea Fleet paid for a memorial to him at Therapia, and the officers and crew of HMS Miranda paid for a memorial to him in the south aisle of the nave of St Paul's Cathedral, London, and erected a gravestone in his memory that is now in Haydarpaşa Cemetery, Üsküdar, Istanbul.

He appears as a character in the books The Valiant Sailors, Hazard of Huntress, and other works, by V.A. Stuart.

== See also ==
- Lyons family

== Sources ==
- O'Byrne, William Richard (1849). "Lyons, Edmund Moubray" . A Naval Biographical Dictionary . John Murray – via Wikisource.
- Langford Vere, Oliver. History of the Island of Antigua, Vol. 2. Mitchell and Hughes, London, 1894. pp. 214–217.
- "Edmund Lyons, 1st Baron Lyons". Oxford Dictionary of National Biography (online ed.). Oxford University Press. 2004. doi:10.1093/ref:odnb/34650. (Subscription, Wikipedia Library access or UK public library membership required.)
- Eardley-Wilmot, S. M. Lord Lyons: Life of Vice-Admiral Edmund, Lord Lyons. Sampson Low, Marston and Company, 1898.
- O’Byrne, William Richard. A Naval Biographical Dictionary, Lyons, Edmund.
- Jenkins, Brian. Lord Lyons: A Diplomat in an Age of Nationalism and War. McGill-Queen’s Press, 2014.
