= Richard Lyon =

Richard Lyon may refer to:

- Richard E. Lyon (1913–2002), illustrator and artist
- Richard F. Lyon (judge) (1819–1894), supreme court justice of Georgia during the Confederacy
- Richard F. Lyon (born 1952), one of the two people who independently invented the first optical mouse devices, co-founder of Foveon
- Richard H. Lyon, engineering professor emeritus at MIT and founder of the RH Lyon Corp, for president of the Acoustical Society of America
- Richard S. Lyon (1924–1976), American football player and coach in the United States
- Richard Lyon-Dalberg-Acton, 4th Baron Acton (1941–2010), British Labour politician who became Baron Acton, of Aldenham in the County of Shropshire
- Rick Lyon (born 1958), puppeteer who created the puppets for Avenue Q
- Dick Lyon (rower) (1939–2019), Stanford University Olympic rowing medalist at the 1964 Tokyo games
- Richard Lyon (naval officer) (1923–2017), US Navy admiral and mayor of Oceanside, California
- Lyon & Lyon, a law firm whose members at various times included Richard D. Lyon, Richard E. Lyon, and Richard F. Lyon

== See also ==
- Richard Lyons (disambiguation)
