= George Lyon =

George Lyon may refer to:

- Babe Lyon (1907–1970), American football player
- George Lyon (Scottish politician) (born 1956), Scottish Liberal Democrat politician
- George Lyon (Canadian politician) (1790–1851), captain in the British Army and a Canadian businessman and politician
- George Lyon (golfer) (1858–1938), Canadian golfer
- George Lyon, 5th Lord Glamis (died 1505)
- George Lyon (highwayman) (1761–1815), Upholland highwayman
- George Hamilton D'Oyly Lyon (1883–1947), cricketer, rugby union player and British Admiral
- George Francis Lyon (1795–1832), Arctic and African explorer
- George Ella Lyon (born 1949), American author from Kentucky

== See also ==
- G. B. Lyon-Fellowes (1815–1876), George Byron Lyon-Fellowes, mayor of Ottawa
- George Lyons (disambiguation)
