= Terry Lyons =

Terry Lyons may refer to:

- Terry Lyons (footballer) (1929–1986), English footballer
- Terry Lyons (mathematician) (born 1953), British mathematician
- Terry Lyons (baseball) (1908–1959), Major League Baseball first baseman
- Terry Lyons (basketball executive) (born 1959), Sports executive
