= Chalmers J. Lyons =

American physician

- Born: April 30, 1874; Martinsburg, Ohio
- Died: 1935

Chalmers J. Lyons (April 30, 1874 - 1935 ) was an American oral surgeon who served as the President of the American Association of Oral and Plastic Surgeons.

== Life ==
Lyons was born in Martinsburg, Ohio in 1874 to John and Manila Lyons. When he was seven years old, he moved to a farm near Mount Pleasant, Michigan. Lyons then attended Central State Normal College. He then later attended School of Dentistry and received his dental degree in 1898.

Following his graduation, Lyons started practicing in Adrian, Michigan. He then moved to Jackson, Michigan where he started practicing with his brother J.W Lyons. Later on, Lyons became a professor at Michigan School of Dentistry, where he taught there until his death.

Lyons, at some point in his career, trained under Truman Brophy and learned about cleft lip and cleft palate surgery. Lyons then opened one of the largest cleft lip and palate clinics. He served as the President of the American Association of Oral and Plastic Surgeons and Michigan State Dental Society. Lyons was also the founder of the Chalmers J. Lyons Club

Lyons married Grace Driggs and had a son named Richard Hugh who attended medical school.

== Awards and Positions ==
- Michigan School of Dentistry - Clinical Instructor (1907–1909)
- Michigan School of Dentistry - Oral Surgery Instructor (1912–1915)
- Executive Committee of School of Dentistry - Chairman
- American Association of Oral and Plastic Surgeons - President
- Michigan State Dental Society - President
