= Richard Lyons (poet) =

American poet, and teacher

- Occupation: Poet

Academic background
- Education: University of Massachusetts Amherst; University of Houston; University of Arizona

Richard Lyons is an American poet and teacher.

== Life ==
He graduated from the University of Massachusetts Amherst, from the University of Arizona with an M.F.A. in Creative Writing (1976–1979), and from the University of Houston with a Ph.D. in English/Creative Writing (1984–1991).

During 1979 and 1980, he taught at the University of Maryland, then at Rhodes College. He teaches in the English Department at Mississippi State University in Starkville, Mississippi, since 1994.

His work appeared in The Nation, Poetry, The New Republic, The Paris Review, and The North American Review.

== Awards ==
- YHMA/The Nation "Discovery" Award for Poetry in 1984
- Stele Ehrhardt Memorial and Culled Fellowship from the University of Houston in 1984
- Alan Cooling Scholarship in Poetry from the Broadleaf Writers' Conference in 1986
- Criterion Fellowship from Imprint, Inc., in 1987
- Peter I. B. Lavan Younger Poets Award from the Academy of American Poets in 1992.
- 1988 Devins Award winner, selected by Deborah Digges, for These Modern Nights
- 2000 James Dickey Contemporary Poets Series, selected by Richard Howard, for Hours of the Cardinal
- 2005 Washington prize, for Fleur Carnivore

== Works ==
- These Modern Nights. University of Missouri Press. 1988. ISBN 978-0-8262-0672-5.
- Hours of the Cardinal. University of South Carolina Press. 2000. ISBN 978-1-57003-321-6.
- Fleur Carnivore, The Word Works (January 1, 2006) ISBN 978-0-915380-61-9
- Granite from Sugar Water
