= Bonnie Lyons =

American writer and academic (born 1944)

Bonnie Lyons (born July 4, 1944) is an American writer and academic.

== Biography ==
Bonnie Lyons was born in Brooklyn, New York and lived there until she was five years old, at which point she moved to Miami Beach, Florida. Her grandparents were Benjamin and Rebecca Kaplan and Benjamin and Rose Dubrow, all of whom were originally from Minsk, Belarus and immigrated in the early twentieth century. Benjamin Dubrow was the founder of the famous Dubrow's Cafeteria, and Bonnie would work there in the summers, often taking orders over the phone.

She was president of her class at Miami Beach High School, but never graduated from high school, choosing instead to leave early and attend Newcomb College at Tulane University in New Orleans, Louisiana. She completed her undergraduate and graduate work at Tulane and received her PhD in English Literature in 1973. She currently lives in San Antonio, Texas and is a full professor at the University of Texas at San Antonio. She is married to Grant Lyons, who is a fiction writer, and has one daughter, Eve Lyons. She and her husband taught in Israel for a year. She also lived in Boston from 1973 to 1976, because her first teaching position was at Boston University. While in Boston, she took a photography class at the Cambridge Center for Adult Education with David Akiba, who went on to become a lifelong friend of hers.

Her primary teaching interests are American literature, Jewish literature, and women writers. She has published articles and interviews in many journals, including The Paris Review and Contemporary Literature. She is the author of a book about American novelist Henry Roth.

In the past ten years, she has started to write and publish poetry, and has published two books and two chapbooks to date.

== Publications ==
- Lyons, Bonnie (1976). Henry Roth, the man and his work. New York: Cooper Square Publishers. p. 182. ISBN 0-8154-0516-2. LCCN 76029874. OCLC 2464583.
- Passion and Craft: Conversations with Notable Writers (co-written with Bill Oliver), 1995. ISBN 0-252-02387-0 (hardcover), ISBN 0-252-06687-1 (paperback)
- Hineni, New Women's Voices Series, No. 15, Finishing Line Press, 2003
- In Other Words, Pecan Grove Press, 2004
- Meanwhile, Finishing Line Press, 2005.
- Bedrock, Pecan Grove Press, 2011
- Wonderful Old Women, Outskirts Press, 2016
