= Peter Lyons (Queensland judge) =

Australian judge

Peter Lyons (born 26 November 1946) is a former justice of the Supreme Court of Queensland in the Trial Division. He graduated from the University of Queensland Faculty of Law in 1976, and is a former president of the Bar Association of Queensland.
