= Grant Lyons =

American writer (born 1941)

- Born: 1941

Grant Lyons (born 1941) is an American writer. He was born in Butler, Pennsylvania, but grew up in Port Arthur, Texas. While attending Thomas Jefferson High School in Port Arthur, Lyons and a group of male friends befriended Janis Joplin, who was otherwise an outcast in school. As documented in all biographies of Janis Joplin, he was the person who played Janis her first Lead Belly record, which is considered a formative influence on her style of singing. He attended Tulane University on a football scholarship, and he has a master's degree in Library Science as well as in History. Lyons is also the grandson of Captain Ulysses Grant Lyons, who ran and was briefly pronounced winner of a U.S. House of Representatives seat, before Earl Beshlin was eventually named the winner.

Lyons published primarily children's nonfiction books, most of which focused on North American Indian tribes and all of which were published by the now defunct publisher Julian Messener. His earliest book was Tales That People Tell In Mexico (1972), and later ones include Andy Jackson and the battles for New Orleans (1976), The Creek Indians (1978), Mustangs, Six Shooters, and Barbed Wire: How the West Was Really Won (1981), and Pacific Coast Indians of North America (1983).

Lyons has also written fiction for adults. His most significant publication to date was the anthology called 4-4-4 (1977), in which four of his short stories appeared in a book with four short stories by Laurence Gonzales and four short stories by Roger Rath, published by the University of Missouri Press Lyons has had short stories published in Cimarron Review, Confrontation, Negative Capability, Northwest Review, Redbook, and Seattle Review.

Lyons was also a teacher and librarian at Keystone School for many years, and currently lives in San Antonio, Texas, with his wife Bonnie Lyons.
