= Ruth Lyons =

Ruth Lyons may refer to:

- Ruth Lyons (broadcaster) (1905–1988), radio and television broadcaster in Cincinnati, Ohio
- Ruth Lyons (EastEnders), a fictional character in British soap opera EastEnders
