= Freedom (Safire novel) =

1987 novel by William Safire

- First edition
- Author: William Safire
- Language: English
- Genre: Historical novel
- Publisher: Doubleday Publishing
- Publication date: August 1987
- Pages: 1125
- ISBN: 978-0-385-15903-6

Freedom is a historical novel by American essayist William Safire, set in the early years of the American Civil War. It concludes with the signing of the Emancipation Proclamation on January 1, 1863.

The novel shows how its main characters grapple with the dilemmas of political morality raised by secession and war. A particular focus is the challenge of reconciling individual rights and liberties with preserving the nation when its existence is threatened (a topic Safire would return to in his non-fiction writing, following the September 11 attacks). The novel shows how this process of wrestling with moral dilemmas in the political setting led, step by step, to the Emancipation Proclamation.

As compared with other historical novels, Freedom is unusual in the volume of detail provided about its sources by the author. In a lengthy appendix, or "underbook" as Safire refers to it, he goes through the novel chapter by chapter, and in some cases line by line, distinguishing fact from fiction, citing his source materials, and weighing the arguments on both sides of various historical controversies.

== Characters ==
Freedom is divided into nine "Books" of 9-25 chapters each, except for Book Nine, which is 47 chapters in length. Each book is named for one of the novels's major characters, whose particular moral challenge is examined in it. (However, the point of view may shift away from the title character for large portions of a book.)

The title characters of the nine books are as follows:

1. John C. Breckinridge, US Senator (expelled for treason), Confederate General.
2. Anna Ella Carroll, political activist, lobbyist and writer.
3. Edwin M. Stanton, US Secretary of War.
4. Ulysses S. Grant, Union General.
5. George B. McClellan, Union General.
6. Salmon P. Chase, US Secretary of the Treasury.
7. The Negro, commanding officer of black Union soldiers (name unknown).
8. McClellan Again.
9. Abraham Lincoln, US President.

Other characters who play continuing and important roles in the novel include the following:

- John Hay, second secretary to President Lincoln.
- Mathew Brady, photographer.
- Rose O'Neal Greenhow, Washington socialite, spy for the Confederacy.
- Allan Pinkerton, detective, chief of Intelligence to General McClellan.
- Elizabeth Keckley, free black seamstress and confidante to Mrs. Lincoln.
- Kate Chase, daughter of Salmon P. Chase.

== Narrative mode ==
Most of Freedom is written in the third-person limited narrative mode, with the point-of-view character usually shifting from chapter to chapter. A number of chapters are presented as excerpts from "John Hay's Diary", and these are written in first-person epistolary mode. (The real John Hay kept an actual diary during this period, which historians consider a valuable primary source. However, it has only very tenuous connections to the fictional diary in the novel.) Major characters listed above, as well as many minor characters, are used to define point of view.

== Plot summary ==
Freedom blends the narrative recounting of actual historical events with fictional events invented by the author.

In general, the credibility quotient is this: if the scene deals with war or politics, it is fact; if it has to do with romance, it is fiction; if it is outrageously and obviously fictional, it is fact.

— William Safire, Note to the Reader

=== Factual elements ===
Freedom traces political and military developments over the period from May, 1861 to January 1, 1863, from the point of view of the Union. Military events in which Breckinridge participates are also shown from the Confederate "side of the hill". As Book One opens, Breckinridge is a member in good standing of the US Senate. His opposition to what he regards as Lincoln's usurpation of power leads him to make speeches that his political opponents construe as treasonous. When the Senate adjourns, his good friend John Weiss Forney warns him that "you will follow your doctrine into the Confederate army," and in the end this is what happens. Book Two deals with the plan to invade the South along the Tennessee River. Anna Ella Carroll is portrayed as the creator of the plan, a controversial position among historians. The novel shows Carroll striving both to make the plan a success and to receive credit for it, goals that are often in tension. Book Three shows Edwin M Stanton succeeding Simon Cameron as Secretary of War with the support of General McClellan, whom he secretly intends to depose. Stanton is portrayed as dedicated to the cause of Union victory and convinced that this end justifies any and all means. (Later in the book McClellan bitterly complains that Stanton is "the most unmitigated scoundrel I ever knew, heard of, or read of," and compares him unfavorably to Judas Iscariot.) Book Four is mainly concerned with military developments—execution of the Tennessee Plan and the Confederate response to it—leading up to, and including, the Battle of Shiloh. It shows how by both sides come to accept the doctrine that the goal of war is the destruction of the enemy's forces; Confederate commander Albert Sidney Johnson tells Breckinridge frankly, "We deal in death."

Books Five and Eight cover McClellan's military campaigns and the efforts of his political opponents to remove him. He is portrayed as torn between his duty to do his utmost against the enemy and his desire to win the war in such a way as will induce the Southern states to return to the Union voluntarily, with slavery intact. Books Six and Seven focus on the struggle to define the role of abolition in the quest to put down the Confederate rebellion. Book Six shows the conflict that Lincoln's thoughts about emancipation create for Salmon P. Chase, who wants to receive credit for this step himself. Book Seven describes the enlistment of black regiments in New Orleans by Union General Benjamin Butler. Butler's thinking is summarized as "Dred Scott, denying blacks their essential humanity, would be a dead letter the moment a black man donned a blue uniform." Book Nine shows the final development of Lincoln's decision to issue the Emancipation Proclamation.

In these sections of the book, Safire generally stays as close as possible to the historical record, in particular wherever contemporaneous records of what was said, such as diaries, letters and transcripts, are available.

=== Fictional elements ===
The main fictional threads of the novel are imagined romances between Breckinridge and Carroll, between John Hay and Kate Chase and, towards the novel's end, between Carroll and Salmon P. Chase. In each case the romance founders due to an improper political-moral decision made by one of the parties. In regard to the latter two pairings, Safire writes in the underbook, "All four surely had romantic attachments—but with other people. The purpose of making these two fictional connections is to provide a prism through which to examine their characters and a hatrack on which to hang other information, as well as to entertain the fact-laden reader and author."

== Illustrations ==
The novel is illustrated with over 80 authentic period photographs, many of them taken by Mathew Brady, which add considerable verisimilitude to the story.

== Critical reception ==
Freedom was the subject of a lengthy review in Commentary by James W. Tuttleton and of a scholarly article by DC Hammer in the Journal of Popular Culture. Reviews by Publishers Weekly and Library Journal can also be read on various commercial websites.
