= Michael Lyons =

Michael Lyons may refer to:

- Michael Lyons (BBC chairman) (born 1949), Chairman of the British Broadcasting Corporation
- Michael Lyons (politician) (1910–1991), senator from County Mayo, Ireland
- Mike Lyons (footballer, born 1932) (1932-2007), English footballer, see List of AFC Bournemouth players
- Michael Lyons (sculptor) (1943-2019), British sculptor
- Mick Lyons (English footballer) (born 1951), English footballer and manager
- Mick Lyons (Gaelic footballer), former Meath Gaelic footballer
