= H. Ray Dunning =

American Wesleyan theologian (born 1926)

Hubert Ray Dunning (born October 26, 1926) is an American Wesleyan theologian, pastor, and educator affiliated with the Church of the Nazarene. He is best known for his systematic theology Grace, Faith & Holiness, a major theological work within the Holiness tradition. Dunning served for more than three decades on the faculty of Trevecca Nazarene University, where he taught theology and philosophy and later became professor emeritus. He also served as president of the Wesleyan Theological Society and became an influential figure in modern Wesleyan-Holiness theology.

== Early life and education ==
Dunning was born on October 26, 1926, in Clarksville, Tennessee. He was raised in Tennessee and joined the Church of the Nazarene after his conversion experience in 1942. In 1952, he married Bettye Dunning, with whom he had three children.

He enrolled at Trevecca Nazarene College in 1944 and graduated in 1948. He later earned a Bachelor of Divinity from Nazarene Theological Seminary, followed by a Master of Arts and a PhD in theology from Vanderbilt University. His doctoral dissertation, completed in 1969, was titled Nazarene Ethics as Seen in a Theological, Historical and Sociological Context.

== Career ==
Before entering full-time academic work, Dunning served for more than a decade as a pastor in the Church of the Nazarene. In 1964, he joined the faculty of Trevecca Nazarene University, where he taught theology, philosophy, and Christian ethics until his retirement in 1995. During his tenure, he chaired the department of religion and philosophy and directed the university's graduate religion program.

Dunning became widely known within Wesleyan theological circles through the publication of Grace, Faith & Holiness: A Wesleyan Systematic Theology in 1988. The work was commissioned by the Church of the Nazarene and became one of the denomination's most influential twentieth-century theological texts. Scholars have identified the volume as an important contribution to modern Wesleyan-Holiness theology. Dunning also served as president of the Wesleyan Theological Society in 1985 and later received the society's lifetime achievement award in 2004.

== Theology ==
Dunning’s theology is rooted in the Wesleyan-Arminian tradition and the Holiness movement. It emphasized the interconnected themes of prevenient grace, faith, justification, and sanctification as central to Wesleyan doctrine. Influenced by Paul Tillich and Nazarene theologian William M. Greathouse, his theological method combined historical theology and philosophical reflection. He also contributed to discussions on Christian discipleship, Christian ethics, ecclesiology, biblical theology and eschatology within the Church of the Nazarene. Several of his works were translated into Portuguese, Spanish, Korean, and other languages.

== Bibliography ==
=== Authored by ===
- Dunning, H. Ray (1963). Our Standard of Conduct. Kansas City, Missouri: Nazarene Publishing House. OCLC 21964654.
- Dunning, H. Ray (1982). The Fruit of the Spirit. Kansas City, Missouri: Beacon Hill Press of Kansas City. ISBN 0-8341-0806-2.
- Dunning, H. Ray (1988). Grace, Faith & Holiness: A Wesleyan Systematic Theology. Kansas City, Missouri: Beacon Hill Press of Kansas City. ISBN 978-0-8341-1219-3.
- Dunning, H. Ray (1991). A Layman's Guide to Sanctification. Kansas City, Missouri: Beacon Hill Press of Kansas City.
- Dunning, H. Ray (1997). A Community of Faith: Celebrating the Church of Jesus Christ and Its Mission to the World. Kansas City, Missouri: Beacon Hill Press of Kansas City. ISBN 978-0-8341-1568-2.
- Strickland, William J.; Dunning, H. Ray (1998). J. O. McClurkan: His Life, His Theology, and Selections from His Writings. Nashville, TN: Trevecca Nazarene University.
- Dunning, H. Ray (1998). Reflecting the Divine Image: Christian Ethics in Wesleyan Perspective. Downers Grove, Illinois: InterVarsity Press. ISBN 978-0-8308-1888-4.
- Dunning, H. Ray (2006). Partakers of the Divine Nature: Holiness in the Epistles of Peter. Salem, OH: Schmul Pub. Co. ISBN 0-88019-516-9.
- Dunning, H. Ray (2008). The Whole Christ for the Whole World: A Wesleyan Perspective on the Work of Christ. Kansas City, Missouri: Beacon Hill Press of Kansas City.
- Dunning, H. Ray (2010). Becoming Christlike Disciples. Bloomington, IN: WestBow Press. ISBN 978-1-4497-0013-3.
- Strickland, William J.; Dunning, H. Ray (2010). Crucified with Christ: The Life and Ministry of William Marvin Greathouse. Nashville, TN: Trevecca Press.
- Dunning, H. Ray (2012). Abraham: The Test of Faith. Kansas City, Missouri: Foundry Publishing.
- Dunning, H. Ray (2016). Holy Living in a Pagan Context: Studies in First and Second Peter. Charleston, SC: n.p.
- Dunning, H. Ray (2016). The quest for happiness : a Wesleyan view of the good life. Charleston, SC: n.p. ISBN 978-1-5228-7698-4.
- Dunning, H. Ray (2016). In Quest of a Holiness Ethic: A History of Ethics in the Church of the Nazarene. Kansas City, Missouri: Foundry Publishing. ISBN 9781533001214.
- Dunning, H. Ray (2017). Pursuing the Divine Image: Toward an Exegetically Based Theology of Holiness. Middletown, DE: n.p.
- Dunning, H. Ray (2018). Landmarks on the Road to the Kingdom. Lexington, KY: Trevecca Nazarene University.
- Dunning, H. Ray (2018). Grace, Faith & Holiness: 30th Anniversary Annotations. Franklin, Tennessee: SacraSage Press.

=== Edited by ===
- Dunning, H. Ray; Wiseman, Neil B. (1990). Biblical Resources for Holiness Preaching: From Text to Sermon. Kansas City, MO: Beacon Hill Press of Kansas City.
- Dunning, H. Ray (1995). The Second Coming: A Wesleyan Approach to the Doctrine of Last Things. Kansas City, Missouri: Beacon Hill Press of Kansas City. ISBN 978-0-8341-1564-4.

=== Articles ===
- Dunning, H. Ray (1982). "Systematic Theology in a Wesleyan Mode" (PDF). Wesleyan Theological Journal. 27 (1): 15–22.
- Dunning, H. Ray (1986). "Holiness and Christian Ethics". Wesleyan Theological Journal. 21 (1): 45–62.
- Dunning, H. Ray (1992). "The Church as a Community of Grace". Preacher's Magazine. 67 (4): 12–19.
- Dunning, H. Ray (2005). "Toward a Personal Paradigm for the Atonement" (PDF). Wesleyan Theological Journal. 40 (2): 157–168.

=== Chapters ===
- Dunning, H. Ray (1983). "Holiness and the Mission of the Church". In Greathouse, William M. (ed.). The Living Wesleyan Tradition. Kansas City, Missouri: Beacon Hill Press of Kansas City. pp. 85–101.
- Dunning, H. Ray (1985). "The Wesleyan Concept of Grace". In Campbell, Ted A. (ed.). Wesleyan Theology Today. Nashville, Tennessee: Kingswood Books. pp. 133–148.
