= Anne Theresa Bickerton Lyons =

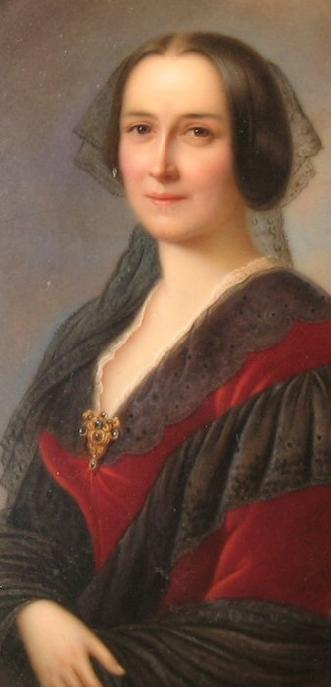
The Baroness von Wurtzburg

The Hon. Anne Theresa Bickerton Lyons, Baroness von Würtzburg (21 November 1815 – 11 June 1894) was a British and German noblewoman.

Anna Theresa born in 1815 to Admiral Edmund Lyons, 1st Baron Lyons, and his wife, Augusta Louisa Rogers (1791 - 1852), who was the daughter of Captain Josiah Rogers R. N..

In Athens, Greece on 24 December 1839, she married Bavarian nobleman, Philipp Hartmann Veit, Baron von Würtzburg (1811 - 1897), who was son of Joseph Franz Lothar Konstantin, Baron von Würtzburg, (1784 - 1865) and his wife, Baroness Caroline Thekla Maria Sophie Charlotte von Mauchenheim gen Bechtolsheim (1787-1856).

Anne died on 11 June 1894 in Bamberg, Bavaria, where she was buried in the village graveyard in Mitwitz.

== Issue ==
Name	Birth	Death	Notes
Edmund von Würtzburg	1840	1906	In Holy Orders
Ludwig Veit von Würtzburg	1845	1922	Last Baron von Würtzburg; married, 8 February 1873, Regina Philon; had issue

== See also ==
- Lyons family

== Sources ==
- "1859 Obituary of Edmund, Baron Lyons" (PDF). Victorian Voices.
- "Lyons, Edmund, first Baron Lyons (1790–1858), naval officer and diplomatist". Oxford Dictionary of National Biography (online ed.). Oxford University Press. 2004. doi:10.1093/ref:odnb/17288. ISBN 978-0-19-861412-8. (Subscription, Wikipedia Library access or UK public library membership required.)
- Eardley-Wilmot, S. M. Lord Lyons:Life of Vice-Admiral Edmund, Lord Lyons. Sampson Low, Marston and Company,1898.
- O’Byrne, William Richard. A Naval Biographical Dictionary, Lyons, Edmund.
- Langford Vere, Oliver. History of the Island of Antigua, Vol. 2. Mitchell and Hughes, London, 1894. pp. 214–217.
- Jenkins, Brian. Lord Lyons: A Diplomat in an Age of Nationalism and War. McGill-Queen’s Press, 2014.
- "Richard Bickerton Pemell Lyons, 1st Viscount Lyons". Oxford Dictionary of National Biography.
