= Josias Rogers =

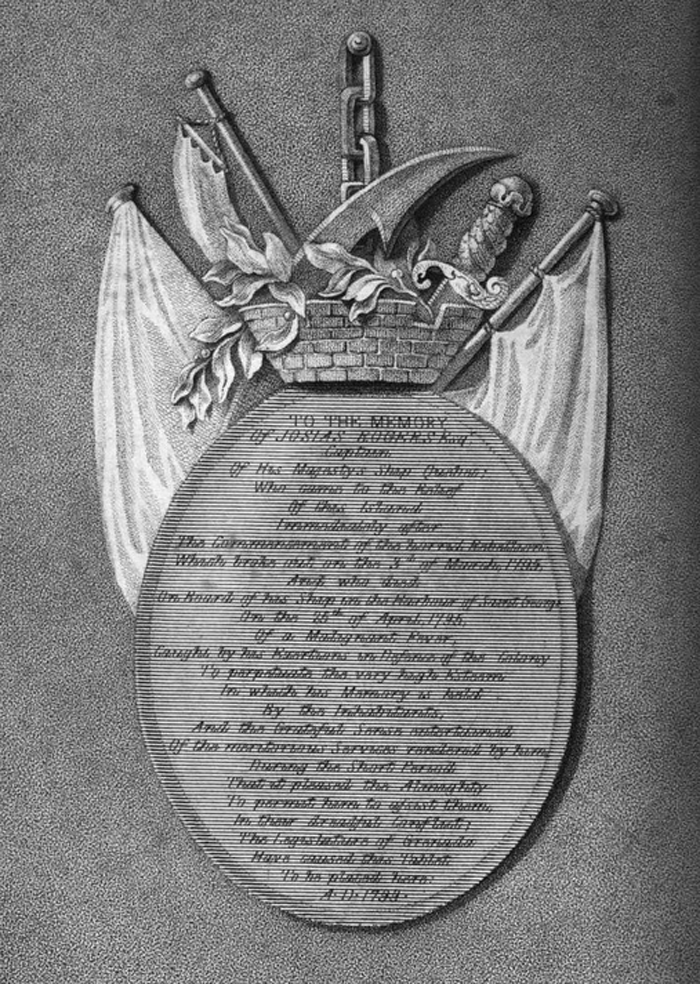
Memorial to Rogers erected by the Assembly of Grenada

Captain Josias Rogers (1755-24 April 1795), was a British naval officer who fought in the American Revolutionary War and the campaigns in Grenada and Martinique.

== Life ==
Born at Lymington, Hampshire, Rogers' father seems to have had a large interest in the local salterns. In October 1771 he entered the Royal Navy on board the fifth-rate HMS Arethusa (1759) with Captain (afterwards Sir) Andrew Hamond, whom he followed to HMS Roebuck in 1775. In March 1776 he was sent away in charge of a prize taken in Delaware Bay, and, being driven on shore in a gale, fell into the hands of the American enemy. He was carried, with much rough treatment, into the interior, and detained for upwards of a year, when he succeeded in making his escape, and, after many dangers and adventures, in getting on board his ship, which happened to be at the time lying in the Delaware River. For the next fifteen or eighteen months he was very actively employed in Roebuck's boats or tenders, capturing or burning small vessels lurking in the creeks along the North American coast, or landing on foraging expeditions. On 19 October 1778 he was promoted to the rank of lieutenant, and after serving in several different ships, and distinguishing himself at the Siege of Charleston, South Carolina in May 1780, on 2 December 1780, he was promoted to the command of HMS General Monk, a prize fitted out as a sloop of war with eighteen guns. After commanding her for sixteen months, in which time he took or assisted in taking more than sixty of the enemy's ships, on 7 April 1782 General Monk, while chasing six small privateers round Cape May, got on shore, and was captured after a stout defence, in which the lieutenant and master were killed and Rogers himself severely wounded. He was shortly afterwards exchanged, and arrived in England in September, still suffering from his wound. From 1783 to 1787 he commanded HMS Speedy in the North Sea, on anti-smuggling operations, and from her, on 1 December 1787, he was advanced to post rank.

In 1790 Rogers was flag captain to Sir John Jervis (afterwards Earl of St. Vincent) in the second-rate HMS Prince. In 1793 he was appointed to the fifth-rate frigate HMS Quebec, and in her, after a few months in the North Sea and off Dunkirk, he joined the fleet which went out with Jervis to the West Indies. He served with distinction at the reduction of Martinique and Guadeloupe in March and April 1794, and was afterwards sent in command of a squadron of frigates to take Cayenne in French Guiana. One of the frigates, however, was lost, two others parted company, and the remainder of his force was unequal to the attempt. In May 1794, along with Robert Faulknor in HMS Blanche and two other ships, Rogers took the Saints from the French. He then rejoined the admiral at a time when yellow fever was raging in the fleet, and Quebec, having suffered severely, was sent to Halifax, Nova Scotia. By the beginning of the following year she was back in the West Indies and was under orders for home, when, at Grenada, where he was conducting the defence of the town against an insurrection of the slaves, he died of yellow fever on 24 April 1795. He was married and left children; his second daughter Augusta Louise (1791–1852) married Edmund Lyons, 1st Baron Lyons on 18 July 1814 at Southwick, Hampshire.

After his death Rogers' widow erected a plaque in his memory at the Church of St Thomas the Apostle, Lymington.
