= George Lyons (theologian) =

American biblical scholar

George Lyons (born December 9, 1947) is a scholar and retired professor of New Testament studies at Northwest Nazarene University. Lyons began teaching at Olivet Nazarene University in 1977.

== Biography ==
=== Personal life ===
George Lyons was born on December 9, 1947, in Richmond, Indiana, United States. He was the son of Galen H. and Georgia M. (Sebby) Lyons. He married Terre Lynn Hickok, May 24, 1969. He has 2 Children: Kara Joy, Nathanael David.

=== Education ===
Lyons holds a bachelor's degrees from Olivet Nazarene University (1970) and a master of Divinity from Nazarene Theological Seminary (1973) as well as a Phd in New Testament, from Emory University (1982).

=== Career ===
Lyons was professor of biblical literature (New Testament and Greek) at Olivet Nazarene University from 1977 to 1991. He was coordinator of the graduate religion literature program (1986-1990) and the department chairman of biblical literature at Olivet Nazarene University (1989-1991).

He was professor of New Testament at Northwest Nazarene from 1991 to 2013. He was also chair of the University Faculty (2008–10).

He has also served as a visiting professor at Nazarene Theological Seminary (1982, 86, 89), Point Loma Nazarene University, Mount Vernon Nazarene University, Nazarene Theological College Australia (1989-1990, 91, 96) and Nazarene Theological College England, Southeast Asia Nazarene Bible College (Bangkok, Thailand) and European Nazarene College (Besingen, Germany and extensions in Razgrad, Bulgaria; Lisbon, Portugal; and Montpelier and Paris, France). He has also taught in China.

He has been the New Testament editor of the Beacon Hill Press of Kansas City. He is the founding director of the Wesley Center Online resources website.

=== Memberships ===
Lyons was a member doctrine of church commission of the Church of Nazarene, Kansas City (1985-1989) and member curriculum committee, since 1990. He was Coordinator of the Kankakee County Hunger Walk (1985-1990).

He has been a member and past president of the Wesleyan Theological Society (member (1977-), secretary membership committee 1986, Second vice president 1992, president 1993-1994). He has been as a member of the Society of Biblical Literature (1972-).

== Theology ==
Lyons served the Church of the Nazarene in the Wesleyan-Holiness tradition. Greathouse and Lyons' New Beacon Bible Commentary (2008) has been described to be part of the Wesleyan tradition. He is believed to affirm open theism.

== Publications ==
=== Books ===
- Lyons, George (1982). The function of autobiographical remarks in the letters of Paul : Galatians and 1 Thessalonians as test cases (Ph. D. Thesis at Emory University). Ann Arbor, MI: University Microfilms International.
- Lyons, George (1985). Pauline Autobiography: Toward a New Understanding. Atlanta: Scholars.
- Truesdale, Albert Lee; Lyons, George; Eby, J. Wesley (1986). A dictionary of the Bible and Christian doctrine : in everyday English. Kansas City, MO: Beacon Hill Press.
- Lyons, George (1992). Holiness in Everyday Life. Kansas City, MO: Beacon Hill Press.
- Lyons, George (1997). More Holiness in Everyday Life. Kansas City, MO: Beacon Hill Press.
- Lyons, George (2006). Listening for God through Revelation (Lectio Divina Bible Studies). Indianapolis: Wesleyan Publishing House.
- Lyons, George (2006). Revelation: Lectio Divina for Youth. Kansas City, MO: Barefoot Ministries.
- Lyons, George (2008). New Beacon Bible Commentary: Romans 1–8. Kansas City, MO: Beacon Hill Press.
- Lyons, George (2008). New Beacon Bible Commentary: Romans 9–16. Kansas City, MO: Beacon Hill Press.
- Lyons, George (2008). New Beacon Bible Commentary: Mark. Kansas City, MO: The Foundry Publishing.
- Lyons, George (2010). New Beacon Bible Commentary: Galatians. Kansas City, MO: Beacon Hill Press.
- The chronological study Bible : New International Version. Nashville; Dallas; Mexico City; Rio de Janeiro: Thomas Nelson. 2014.
- Lyons, George (2019). New Beacon Bible Commentary: Ephesians/Colossians/Philemon. Kansas City, MO: The Foundry Publishing.
- Lyons, George (2020). New Beacon Bible Commentary: John 1-12. Kansas City, MO: The Foundry Publishing.
- Lyons, George (2020). New Beacon Bible Commentary: John 13-21. Kansas City, MO: The Foundry Publishing.

=== Chapters ===
- Lyons, George (2011). "Knowing the Scriptures: How to Study the Bible as a Spiritual Practice". In Leclerc, Diane; Maddix, Mark A. (eds.). Spiritual Formation: A Wesleyan Paradigm. Kansas City, MO: Beacon Hill Press.

=== Articles ===
Lyons has several articles that appear in the Wesleyan Theological Journal.

- Lyons, George (2000). "The Millennium Revelation 20:1-10". CRI/Voice, Institutey (Sermon delivered at the NNU chapel).

== Notes and references ==
=== Sources ===
- BAS (1993). Who's who in Biblical Studies and Archaeology. Washington, D.C.: Biblical Archaeology Society.
- Evans, John F. (2016). A Guide to Biblical Commentaries and Reference Works: 10th Edition. Grand Rapids, MI: Zondervan Academic.
- TFP (2018). "George Lyons". The Foundry Publishing. Kansas City.
- NNU (2020). "Essay Collection Recognizes Contributions of Dr. George Lyons". Northwest Nazarene University.
- Thompson, Richard P. (2020). "George Lyons: Professor, Scholar, Churchman". Listening Again to the Text: New Testament Studies in Honor of George Lyons. Vol. 4. Claremont: Claremont Press. pp. vii–x. doi:10.2307/j.ctv138wrtq.3. ISBN 9781946230447. JSTOR j.ctv138wrtq.3. S2CID 226080776.
- Sanders, John (2018). "Who Has Affirmed Dynamic Omniscience and the Open Future in History?". John Sanders.
- SFDCN (2020). "Board of Ministry Day 2020". Southern Florida District Church of the Nazarene.
