= Augusta Fitzalan-Howard, Duchess of Norfolk =

Augusta Mary Minna Catherine Fitzalan-Howard, Duchess of Norfolk (née Lyons; 1 August 1821 in Torquay, Devon – 22 March 1886 Norfolk House, London), commonly known by her middle name "Minna", was an English member of the peerage and supporter of the Brompton Oratory.

The younger daughter of Edmund Lyons, 1st Baron Lyons and Augusta Louisa, Lady Lyons, Minna was residing with her parents in Athens between 1838 and 1839, whilst her father was serving as the British Minister to Greece, when Henry Fitzalan-Howard (later the 14th Duke of Norfolk), became a guest of Sir Edmund Lyons. Whilst a guest, Lord Fitzalan was disabled by an attack of fever, and subsequently nursed by Augusta, with whom he fell in love. The two married with on 19 June 1839, and subsequently had eleven children.

Together with her husband, Fitzalan-Howard was a supporter of the Brompton Oratory.

Augusta Minna, Duchess Dowager of Norfolk, died on 22 March 1886, and was buried at Fitzalan Chapel in the grounds of Arundel Castle.

== Issue ==
Name	Birth	Death	Notes
Lady Victoria Alexandrina Fitzalan-Howard	1840	1870	Married 1861, James Robert Hope-Scott
Lady Minna Charlotte Fitzalan-Howard	1843	1921	Carmelite nun
Lady Mary Adeliza Fitzalan-Howard	1845	1925
Henry Fitzalan-Howard, 15th Duke of Norfolk	1847	1917	15th Duke of Norfolk
Lady Etheldreda Fitzalan-Howard	1849	1926	Sister of Charity
Lady Philippa Fitzalan-Howard	1852	1946	Married 1888, Sir Edward Stewart (1857–1948)
Hon. Philip Thomas Fitzalan-Howard	1853	1855
Lord Edmund Bernard FitzAlan-Howard	1855	1947	Created Viscount FitzAlan of Derwent; Married 1879, Lady Mary Caroline Bertie (1859–1938)
Lady Anne Fitzalan-Howard	1857	1931	Married 1878, Maj-Gen. Lord Ralph Drury Kerr (1837–1916), son of the 7th Marquess of Lothian
Lady Elizabeth Mary Fitzalan-Howard	1859	1859
Lady Margaret Fitzalan-Howard	1860	1899	Founded the Catholic Social Union

== See also ==
- Lyons family
