= William Safire =

American journalist and presidential speechwriter (1929–2009)

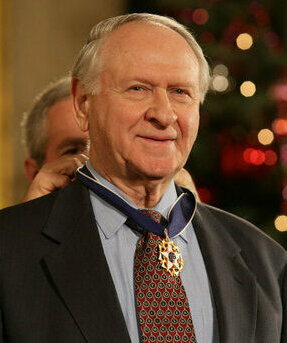
- Safire receiving the Presidential Medal of Freedom in 2006
- Born: William Lewis Safir; December 17, 1929; New York City, U.S.
- Died: September 27, 2009 (aged 79); Rockville, Maryland, U.S.
- Occupations: Author; columnist; lexicographer; journalist; political speechwriter
- Spouse: Helene Belmar Julius
- Children: 2
- Writing career
- Genre: Non-fiction
- Subject: Politics

William Lewis Safire (/ˈsæfaɪər/; né Safir; December 17, 1929 – September 27, 2009) was an American author, columnist, journalist, and presidential speechwriter. He was a long-time syndicated political columnist for The New York Times and wrote the "On Language" column in The New York Times Magazine about popular etymology, new or unusual usages, and other language-related topics.

== Early life and education ==
Safire was born William Lewis Safir in New York City on December 17, 1929, the son of Ida (née Panish) and Oliver Craus Safir. His family was Jewish and of Romanian origin on his father's side. Safire later added an "e" to his surname to better convey its pronunciation, while his brothers Leonard Safir and Matthew P. Safir continued to use the original spelling.

Safire graduated from the Bronx High School of Science, a specialized public high school in New York City. He attended S. I. Newhouse School of Public Communications at Syracuse University but dropped out after two years. He delivered the commencement address at Syracuse in 1978 and 1990, and later became a trustee of the university.

== Career ==
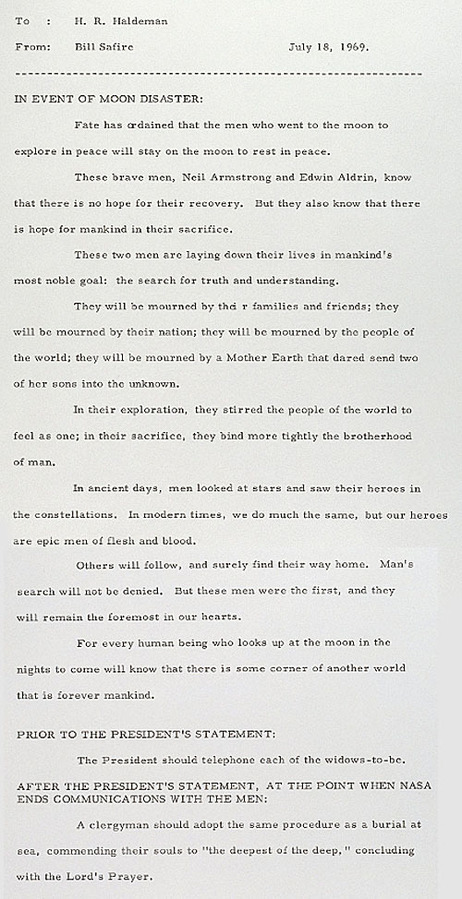
William Safire memo to H. R. Haldeman to be used in the event that Apollo 11 ended in disaster.

After dropping out of Syracuse, Safire worked for noted public relations specialist and journalist Tex McCrary throughout the 1950s, first as a gofer and later as a public relations associate. He worked as a publicist for a homebuilder who exhibited a model home at an American trade fair at Sokolniki Park in Moscow in 1959, where then-vice president Richard Nixon and Soviet premier Nikita Khrushchev had their so-called "Kitchen Debate". A widely circulated black-and-white photograph of that event was taken by Safire.

Safire worked for Nixon's campaign during the 1960 presidential race, and did so again for the 1968 campaign. After Nixon's victory in the 1968 election, Safire served as a speechwriter for him and also for vice president Spiro Agnew. He is known for having penned Agnew's famous alliterative phrase, "nattering nabobs of negativism".

=== The "Safire Memo" ===
Safire drafted a never-delivered speech titled "In Event of Moon Disaster", for President Nixon to deliver on television in the event the Apollo 11 astronauts were stranded on the Moon. According to the plans, Mission Control would "close down communications" with the LEM and a clergyman would have commended their souls to "the deepest of the deep" in a public ritual likened to burial at sea. Presidential telephone calls to the astronauts' wives were also planned. The speech originated in a memo from Safire to Nixon's chief of staff H. R. Haldeman, whence the name "Safire Memo", suggesting a protocol the administration might follow in reaction to such a disaster. The last line of the draft speech was an allusion to Rupert Brooke's First World War poem "The Soldier". In a 2013 piece for Foreign Policy magazine, Joshua Keating included the speech as one of six entries in a list of "The Greatest Doomsday Speeches Never Made".

=== New York Times columnist ===
Safire joined The New York Times as a political columnist in 1973. Soon after joining the Times, Safire learned that he had been the target of "national security" wiretaps authorized by Nixon, and, after observing that he had worked only on domestic matters, wrote with what he characterized as "restrained fury" that he had not worked for Nixon through a difficult decade "to have him—or some lizard-lidded paranoid acting without his approval—eavesdropping on my conversations". Portions of Safire's FBI file were released in 2010. The documents "detail wiretapping ordered by the Nixon administration, including the tapping of Safire's phone".

In 1978, Safire won the Pulitzer Prize for Commentary on Bert Lance's alleged budgetary irregularities; in 1981, Lance was acquitted by a jury on all nine charges. Safire's column on October 27, 1980, entitled "The Ayatollah Votes", was quoted in a campaign ad for Ronald Reagan in that year's presidential election. Safire also frequently appeared on NBC's Meet the Press. Upon announcing the retirement of Safire's political column in 2005, Arthur Sulzberger Jr., publisher of The New York Times, said:

The New York Times without Bill Safire is all but unimaginable, Bill's provocative and insightful commentary has held our readers captive since he first graced our Op-Ed Page in 1973. Reaching for his column became a critical and enjoyable part of the day for our readers across the country and around the world. Whether you agreed with him or not was never the point, his writing is delightful, informed and engaging.

=== Pulitzer Board member ===
Safire served as a member of the Pulitzer Prize Board from 1995 to 2004. After ending his op-ed column, he became the full-time chief executive of the Dana Foundation, where he was chairman from 2000. In 2006, Safire was awarded the Presidential Medal of Freedom by President George W. Bush.

=== Writing on English ===
In addition to his political columns, Safire wrote a column, "On Language", in the weekly The New York Times Magazine from 1979 until the month of his death. Many of the columns were collected in books. According to the linguist Geoffrey Pullum, over the years Safire became less of a "grammar-nitpicker," and Benjamin Zimmer cited Safire's willingness to learn from descriptive linguists. Another book on language was The New Language of Politics (1968), which developed into what Zimmer called Safire's "magnum opus," Safire's Political Dictionary.

== Political views ==
Safire described himself as a "libertarian conservative". A Washington Post story on the ending of his op-ed column quotes him on the subject:

I'm willing to zap conservatives when they do things that are not libertarian. [After the 9/11 attacks,] I was the first to really go after George W. on his treatment of prisoners.

After voting for Bill Clinton in 1992, Safire became one of the leading critics of the Clinton administration. Hillary Clinton in particular was often the target of his ire. He caused controversy in a January 8, 1996, essay when, after reviewing her record, he concluded she was a "congenital liar". Although she did not respond to the specific instances cited, Hillary Clinton said that she did not feel offended for herself but for her mother's sake. According to Bill Clinton's press secretary at the time, Mike McCurry, "the President, if he were not the President, would have delivered a more forceful response to that on the bridge of Mr. Safire's nose."

Safire was one of several voices who called for the Iraq War, and predicted a "quick war" and wrote: "Iraqis, cheering their liberators, will lead the Arab world toward democracy." He consistently brought up the point in his Times columns that an Iraqi intelligence agent met with Mohamed Atta, one of the 9/11 hijackers, in Prague, which he called an "undisputed fact". According to the CIA and the FBI, they were unable to confirm or deny the validity of this assertion. The source who made these allegations is alleged to have become concerned that such a meeting could have harmed his career. Nonetheless, Khalid Sheikh Mohammed and Ramzi bin al-Shibh do deny that the meeting took place. Safire insisted that the theory was true and used it to make a case for war against Iraq. He also incorrectly predicted that "freed scientists" would lead coalition forces to "caches [of weapons of mass destruction] no inspectors could find".

Safire was staunchly pro-Israel. He received the Guardian of Zion Award of Bar-Ilan University in 2005. President George W. Bush appointed him to serve on the Honorary Delegation to accompany him to Jerusalem for the celebration of the 60th anniversary of the State of Israel in May 2008.

== Personal life and death ==
Safire married Helene Belmar Julius in 1962. The couple had two children. Safire died from pancreatic cancer at a hospice in Rockville, Maryland, on September 27, 2009, aged 79.

== Publications ==
The following is a partial list of his writings:

Language

- The Right Word in the Right Place at the Right Time: Wit and Wisdom from the Popular Language Column in The New York Times Magazine (2004) ISBN 0-7432-4244-0
- No Uncertain Terms: More Writing from the Popular "On Language" Column in The New York Times Magazine (2003) ISBN 0-7432-4243-2
- Take My Word for It (1986) ISBN 0-8129-1323-X
- On Language (1980) Times Books ISBN 0-8129-0937-2
- Fumblerules: A Lighthearted Guide to Grammar and Good Usage (1990) ISBN 0-440-21010-0
- In Love with Norma Loquendi (1994) ISBN 978-0307799753

Novels

- Scandalmonger (2000) ISBN 0-684-86719-2
- Sleeper Spy (1995) ISBN 0-679-43447-X
- Freedom: A Novel of Abraham Lincoln and the Civil War (1987) ISBN 0-385-15903-X
- Full Disclosure (1978) ISBN 0-385-12115-6

Edited collections

- Lend Me Your Ears: Great Speeches in History (1997) ISBN 0-393-04005-4
- Words of Wisdom: More Good Advice (1989) ISBN 0-671-67535-4
- Good Advice (1982) quotations compiled with his brother, Leonard Safir ISBN 0-517-08473-2

Political works

- Safire's Political Dictionary, 3rd edition, Random House, NY, 1968, 1972, 1978. ISBN 0-394-50261-2
- The Relations Explosion
- Plunging into Politics
- Before the Fall: An Inside View of the Pre-Watergate White House
- The First Dissident: The Book of Job in Today's Politics, Random House, NY, 1992

Speeches

- "In Event of Moon Disaster", a presidential speech Safire wrote (but Nixon never delivered)

== General and cited references ==
- Larry Berman and Bruce W. Jentleson, "Bush and the Post-Cold War World: New Challenges for American Leadership" in The Bush Presidency: First Appraisals. eds. Colin Campbell, S.J., Bert A. Rockman. 1991. Chatham House. ISBN 0-934540-90-X.
