= Lyon (surname) =

Lyon is a surname of various origins.

As a consequence of the lack, before the 18th century, of standardised spelling for the French pronunciation of the surname: some members of the Anglo-Norman landed gentry Lyons family (who descended from Ingelram de Lyons The Elder) removed the 's' from the end of the surname, producing 'Lyon'. For example, the 16th century Lord Mayor of London Sir John Lyon used the spelling 'Lyon', despite that his father, Thomas Lyons [sic] of Perivale, used the spelling 'Lyons'.

There are many other unrelated people with the same surname. Notable people with the surname include:

- A. Laurence Lyon (1934–2006), American music composer
- Alexander Lyon (disambiguation)
- Alastair Lyon (born 1979), South African rugby player
- Anne Bozeman Lyon (1860–1936), American writer
- Arthur Lyon (disambiguation)
- Asa Lyon (1763–1841), American politician
- Babe Lyon (1907–1970), American football player
- Barbara Lyon (1931–1995), American-born singer who lived and worked mostly in England
- Barrett Lyon (born 1978), American computer entrepreneur
- Ben Lyon (1901–1979), American film actor
- Beverley Lyon (1902–1970), British cricketer
- Bill Lyon (1886–1962), Australian football player
- Billy Lyon (born 1973), American football player
- Bob Lyon (born 1955), American politician
- Brandon Lyon (born 1979), American baseball pitcher
- Bruce Lyon, American film producer
- Caleb Lyon (1822–1875), American politician from Idaho
- Charles Lyon (disambiguation)
- Chittenden Lyon (1787–1842), American politician
- Christopher Lyon, American political consultant
- Daniel Lyon (born 1980), American wrestler
- Danny Lyon (born 1942), American photographer and filmmaker
- David Lyon (disambiguation)
- Dar Lyon (1898–1964), English cricketer
- Duffy Lyon (1929–2011), American farmer and butter sculptor
- Edward E. Lyon (1871–1931), American soldier and war hero
- Elinor Lyon (1921–2008), English author
- Francis D. Lyon (1905–1996), American film editor
- Francis Strother Lyon (1800–1882), American and Confederate States politician
- Frank Lyon (1867–1955), American lawyer, newspaper publisher and land developer
- Fred Lyon (1924–2022), American photographer
- Frederick A. Lyon (1843–1911), American soldier, awarded the Medal of Honor
- Gail Lyon, American filmmaker
- Garry Lyon (born 1967), Australian rules footballer
- George Lyon (disambiguation)
- Gordon Lyon (born 1977), computer expert
- Gustave Lyon (1857–1936), French piano maker, acoustician and inventor
- Guy J. Lyon (1933–2001), American horse trainer
- Harris Merton Lyon (1882–1916), American author
- Harry Lyon (disambiguation)
- Hart Lyon (1721–1800), British rabbi
- Holly Lyon, American politician
- Homer L. Lyon (1879–1956), American politician
- Howard Lyon, American artist
- Hylan B. Lyon (1836–1907), Confederate general in the American Civil War
- Ivan Lyon (1915–1944), British Second World War lieutenant colonel
- James Lyon (disambiguation)
- Jamie Lyon (born 1982), Australian rugby player
- Jason Lyon (born 1986), Canadian archer
- Jean Lyon, Countess of Strathmore and Kinghorne (1713–1778), British noblewoman
- Jennifer Lyon (1972–2010), American actress
- Jimmy Lyon (disambiguation)
- Jo Anne Lyon (born 1940), American Methodist
- John Lyon (disambiguation)
- Joshua Lyon (born 1974), American author
- Juliet Lyon, director of Prison Reform Trust
- Leo De Lyon (1925–2021), American voice actor
- Leviticus Lyon (1894–1958) American tenor vocalist, stage director
- Lisa Lyon (1953–2023), American bodybuilder
- Lucius Lyon (1800–1851), American politician
- Lyon sisters, two teenagers who vanished in 1975
- Marcus Ward Lyon, Jr. (1875–1942), American mammalogist, bacteriologist, and pathologist
- Marion Jean Lyon (1885–1940), British advertising manager
- Mary Lyon (1797–1849), American pioneer in women's education
- Mary Lyon (writer), American author
- Mary F. Lyon (1925–2014), English geneticist
- Matthew Lyon (1749–1822), American politician
- Myer Lyon (1750–1797), German-born English singer
- Nathan Lyon (chef), American television personality and chef
- Nathan Lyon (cricketer) (born 1987), Australian cricketer
- Nathaniel Lyon (1818–1861), American Civil War general
- Nick Lyon (born 1970), American filmmaker
- Noah Lyon (born 1979), American artist
- P. H. B. Lyon (1893–1986), British poet and educator
- Peter Lyon (born 1941), Australian football player
- Phyllis Lyon (1924–2020), American feminist and gay-rights activist
- Richard Lyon (disambiguation)
- Rick Lyon (born 1958), American puppeteer
- Robert Lyon (disambiguation)
- Rod Lyon, British radio personality
- Ross Lyon (born 1966), Australian football player and coach
- Russ Lyon (1913–1975), American baseball player
- Sam Lyon (1890–1977), English footballer
- Sterling Lyon (1927–2010), Canadian politician from Manitoba
- Steve Lyon (born 1952), Canadian hockey player
- Sue Lyon, (1946–2019), American actress
- T. Edgar Lyon (1903–1978), American scholar
- Thomas Lyon (disambiguation)
- Tom Lyon, British escape artist
- Waldo K. Lyon (1914–1998), American Navy research scientist
- Waldo Lyon (Nebraska pioneer) (1810–1884), founder of Lyons, Nebraska
- Walter Lyon (poet) (1887–1915), British war poet
- Walter Lyon (cricketer) (1841–1918), English cricketer
- Walter Lyon (Pennsylvania politician) (1853–1933), American politician
- William Lyon (film editor) (1903–1974), American film editor
- William Lyon (bishop) (died 1617), British cleric
- William Lyon (general) (1923–2020), American Air Force major general
- William C. Lyon (1841–1908), American politician from Ohio
- William Durie Lyon (1825–1893), Canadian politician
- William P. Lyon (1822–1913), American politician

== Fictional characters ==
- Adam Lyon, the main character of My Gym Partner's a Monkey who attends a school for animals instead of humans, due to a clerical error misspelling his surname as “Lion” instead of “Lyon”.

== See also ==
- Lyons (surname)
- General Lyon (disambiguation)
- Senator Lyon (disambiguation)
