= James Lyons =

James, or Jim Lyons may refer to:

== Arts and entertainment ==
- James L. Lyons (1916–1994), founder of the Monterey Jazz Festival
- James Lyons (film editor) (1960–2007), American film editor and actor

== Politics ==
- James Lyons (Upper Canada politician), merchant and political figure in Upper Canada
- James Lyons (Virginia politician) (1801–1882), Confederate politician
- James Lyons (Queensland politician) (1842–1915), member of the Queensland Legislative Assembly
- James E. Lyons (politician) (1857–1943), American politician
- James Lyons (New South Wales politician) (1875–1955), member of the New South Wales Legislative Council
- James W. Lyons (1878–1947), Canadian politician
- James J. Lyons (1890–1966), American politician
- James J. Lyons Jr., Massachusetts politician
- James Lyons (political adviser), British political adviser and journalist

== Others ==
- James Alexander Lyons (1861–1920), American accountancy author and publisher
- James Lyons (admiral) (1927–2018), US Navy admiral, former Commander-in-Chief, Pacific Fleet
- James E. Lyons (academic) (born 1943), American academic administrator
- James Lyons (lawyer) (born 1947), American lawyer, figure in the Whitewater controversy and former federal judicial nominee
- James R. Lyons, plastic surgeon and author
- Jim Lyons (footballer) (1876–1934), Australian rules footballer

== See also ==
- Jimmie Lyons (1889–1961), American baseball player
- Jimmy Lyons (disambiguation)
- James Lyon (disambiguation)
- Jimmy Lyon (disambiguation)
