= Jimmy Lyons =

Jimmy Lyons may refer to:

- Jimmy Lyons (saxophonist) (1931–1986), American alto saxophone player
- Jimmy Lyons (footballer) (1897–1970), English footballer
- Jimmie Lyons (1889–1961) also known as James Henry Lyons, American baseball player

== See also ==
- Jim Lyons (footballer) (1876–1934), Australian rules footballer
- Jimmy Lyon (disambiguation)
- James Lyons (disambiguation)
- James Lyon (disambiguation)
- Lyon (surname)
- Lyons (surname)
