= James E. Lyons =

James E. Lyons may refer to:

- James E. Lyons (politician) (1857–1943), American politician
- James E. Lyons (academic) (born 1943), American academic administrator
