= Jill Hazelbaker =

Communications executive and political campaign spokesperson

- Born: 1981 or 1982 (age 44–45); Salem, Oregon, U.S.
- Education: University of Oregon
- Political party: Republican

Jill Hazelbaker (born 1981) is a communications executive, political campaign spokesperson and campaign staff member primarily for candidates of the Republican Party in the United States. She was the national communications director for John McCain's presidential campaign. She has since worked for Google and is currently Chief Marketing Officer and Senior Vice President, Communications & Public Policy at Uber. Fortune magazine included her in their 2020 '40 Under 40' listing under the technology category.

== Early life and education ==
A native of Salem, Oregon, Hazelbaker attended the University of Oregon, studying political science while she worked for the school newspaper, Oregon Daily Emerald. While a student, Hazelbaker had a congressional internship in Washington, D.C. for Rep. Greg Walden, an Oregon Republican.

== Political campaign work ==
In 2002, she worked on Sen. Gordon Smith's 2002 re-election campaign. In 2004, she worked to help Republican Jim Zupancic in his campaign against U.S. Rep. Darlene Hooley, which led to a short stint at the New York-based consulting firm Mercury Consulting.

Hazelbaker served as a campaign spokeswoman for the 2006 US Senate campaign of Republican Thomas Kean Jr. New Jersey graduate student Juan Melli, founder of a blog and online forum called Blue Jersey, noticed that between July and September one IP address had registered four different accounts, each one claiming to be a Democrat but posting multiple anti-Menendez comments using pseudonyms like usedtobeblue and cleanupnj. The same IP address was also used for multiple Wikipedia edits attacking Menendez. This IP address had also been used to send emails signed by Hazelbaker. Hazelbaker and Kean both denied that she had played any role in astroturfing, although neither denied that the activity originated from a Kean campaign computer.

The Kean campaign also drew scrutiny over its relationship with opposition researcher Christopher Lyon.

On December 21, 2006, Hazelbaker was hired to serve as New Hampshire communications director on the staff of John McCain, who became the Republican candidate for president in the 2008 election. Following a shakeup on the McCain campaign in the summer of 2007, most of McCain's media team resigned. Hazelbaker was then promoted to national communications director.

In 2009 she worked for Michael Bloomberg's campaign for reelection as Mayor of New York. On the Bloomberg team, Hazelbaker was working under Howard Wolfson, the former communications director for Hillary Clinton's presidential campaign.

In 2020, she endorsed Joe Biden for president.

== Business career ==
After working for Bloomberg, Hazelbaker went to work for Google, where she spent four years and her positions included Senior Director of Public Relations and Internal Communications across EMEA, head of government relations in the EU, and finally head of corporate communications. In a study of executive career paths published in March 2014, she was singled out as the youngest executive studied and for having advanced extremely rapidly due to the nature of political campaigns. From October 2014 to October 2015, she was head of communications for Snapchat. In October 2015 she joined Uber as Senior Vice President of Global Policy and Communications and is currently Chief Marketing Officer and Senior Vice President, Communications & Public Policy.
