= Brooke Lyons =

American actress (born 1980)

- Born: November 8, 1980 (age 45); Washington, D.C., U.S.
- Education: Yale University
- Occupation: Actress
- Years active: 2004–present
- Spouse: Max Osswald (m. 2014)
- Children: 2
- Parent(s): James R. Lyons; Penny A. Sousa-Lyons
- Website: brookelyons.com

Brooke Ashley Lyons (born November 8, 1980) is an American actress. She is known for her roles as Amy in the 2008 film Welcome Home Roscoe Jenkins and as Peach Landis in the CBS sitcom 2 Broke Girls.

== Early life and education ==
Lyons was born in Washington, D.C. She is the daughter of surgeon James R. Lyons and dancer Penny A. Lyons (née Sousa). She is of Italian, Irish and Portuguese descent and grew up in Fairfield and New Haven, Connecticut, and several other towns in the state. She spent a lot of her youth both dancing and riding horses, giving up the latter to focus on the former.

As a child she suffered from scoliosis, which prevented her from a pursuing a career as a ballet dancer. Before being diagnosed, she studied dance at the Joffrey Ballet School, the New England Ballet School in Connecticut, the Boston Ballet and traveled to France. She wore a back brace throughout her time in the ninth grade. She ultimately had surgery to correct her spine.

While she was freshman at Yale University, she founded the Connecticut Scoliosis Association and wrote about her experiences with the disease in the book titled Scoliosis: Ascending the Curve. The book was published before she began classes at Yale in 1999.

While at Yale she majored in English literature and was a member of the "Arts and Letters" Manuscript Society.

== Career ==
Lyons then became interested in acting, receiving her first speaking role in the Neil Simon play Rumors. She also worked in the productions The Maids and Heartbreak House. She received additional acting training at The Groundlings in Los Angeles.

Beginning in 2004, Lyons appeared in the television series American Dreams, That's So Raven, The Starter Wife, and Desperate Housewives, and has had recurring roles in 2 Broke Girls, The Affair, and Jane by Design.

In film, her most notable acting role to date was as Amy in the 2008 film Welcome Home Roscoe Jenkins. She also appeared in the films The Trap (2005), Protecting the King (2007), and Dark Reel (2008).

== Personal life ==
In 2014, Lyons married film producer Max Osswald. She and Osswald have a son, born in August 2017. Lyons co-starred in two films that Osswald produced, the short film To Sonnets and the television film A Deadly Adoption.

== Filmography ==
=== Film ===
Year	Title	Role	Notes
2005	The Trap	Erica	
2007	Protecting the King	Monica	
2007	X's & O's	Hazel	
2008	Welcome Home Roscoe Jenkins	Amy	
2008	The American Mall	Dori	TV movie
2008	Dark Reel	Tanya Kismen	
2009	The Morning After	Kristen	Short
2009	The Inner Circle	Sarah Lambert	
2009	Good: The Green Hotel	Concierge (voice)	Short
2010	A Real Break-Up	Sarah	Short
2010	Beautiful Boy	TV reporter voice	
2012	To Sonnets	-	Short
2015	A Deadly Adoption	Christine	TV movie
2016	Waitlisted	Priscilla	Short
2022	40ish...	Gayle	Short
2023	Some Other Woman	Chelsea Ranza	
2025	Bad Men Must Bleed	Sarah Wallace	

=== Television ===
Year	Title	Role	Notes
2004	American Dreams	Erin	Episode: "A Clear and Present Danger"
2006	That's So Raven	Nikki Logan	Episode: "Unhappy Medium"
2008	The Starter Wife	Edie	Episode: "Mollywood"
2009	Desperate Housewives	Candace	Episode: "Never Judge a Lady by Her Lover"
2010	Important Things with Demetri Martin	Helen	Episode: "Strategy"
2010	DateaHuman.com	Ruthie	Main Cast
2011	Law & Order: LA	Greta Thomas	Episode: "Benedict Canyon"
2011	Love Bites	Coby	Episode: "Keep on Truckin'"
2011–12	2 Broke Girls	Peach Landis	Recurring Cast: Season 1
2012	Jane by Design	Birdie	Recurring Cast
2012	Sullivan & Son	Ashley	Episode: "Pilot: Last, Best, and Final"
2012	Royal Pains	Talia Clarke	Episode: "Something Fishy This Way Comes"
2013	The Crazy Ones	Nancy	Episode: "Sixteen-Inch Softball"
2013	Psych	Elisa	Episode: "Psych: The Musical"
2014	Two and a Half Men	Gwen	Episode: "Baseball. Boobs. Boobs. Baseball."
2014	Anger Management	Dr. Everheart	Episode: "Charlie and Jordan Go to Prison"
2014	Deadbeat	Bloody Mary	Episode: "Raising the Dead"
2014	Friends with Better Lives	Linda	Episode: "Something New"
2014	Perception	Anne	Episode: "Shiver"
2014	Mulaney	Cassidy	Episode: "Motif & the City"
2015	One Big Happy	Erica	Episode: "Out of the Closet"
2015	The Exes	Sophie	Episode: "The 40 Year-Old Her-Gin"
2015–17	iZombie	Natalie	Guest: Season 2, Recurring Cast: Season 3
2015–19	The Affair	Eden Ellery	Recurring Cast: Season 2 & 5
2016	Grandfathered	Juliet	Episode: "The Boyfriend Experience"
2016	The Mindy Project	Theresa Miller	Episode: "2 Fast 2 Serious"
2016	Bones	Katie Stober	Episode: "The Head in the Abutment"
2016	Party Girl	Jackie	Episode: "Ex Best Friend"
2018	9JKL	Kim	Episode: "Tell All"
2018	Life Sentence	Elizabeth Abbott Rojas	Main Cast
2019	Magnum P.I.	Abby Miller	Guest: Season 1, Recurring Cast: Season 2
2020	Lincoln Rhyme: Hunt for the Bone Collector	Kate	Main Cast
2021	Paradise City	Capricorn	Main Cast
2022	Reasonable Doubt	Sarah Miller	Recurring Cast: Season 1
2023	B.O.	Mantovani (voice)	Episode: "Faca no Ursinho"
2024	The Rookie	Brenda Vaughn	Episode: "Secrets and Lies"
2026	Animal Control	Julie	Episode: "Crows and Lizard Legs"

=== Video games ===
Year	Title	Role	Notes
2016	World of Final Fantasy	Princess Sarah	
