= 2006 United States Senate election in New Jersey =

- November 7, 2006
- Turnout: 48% (▼22pp)
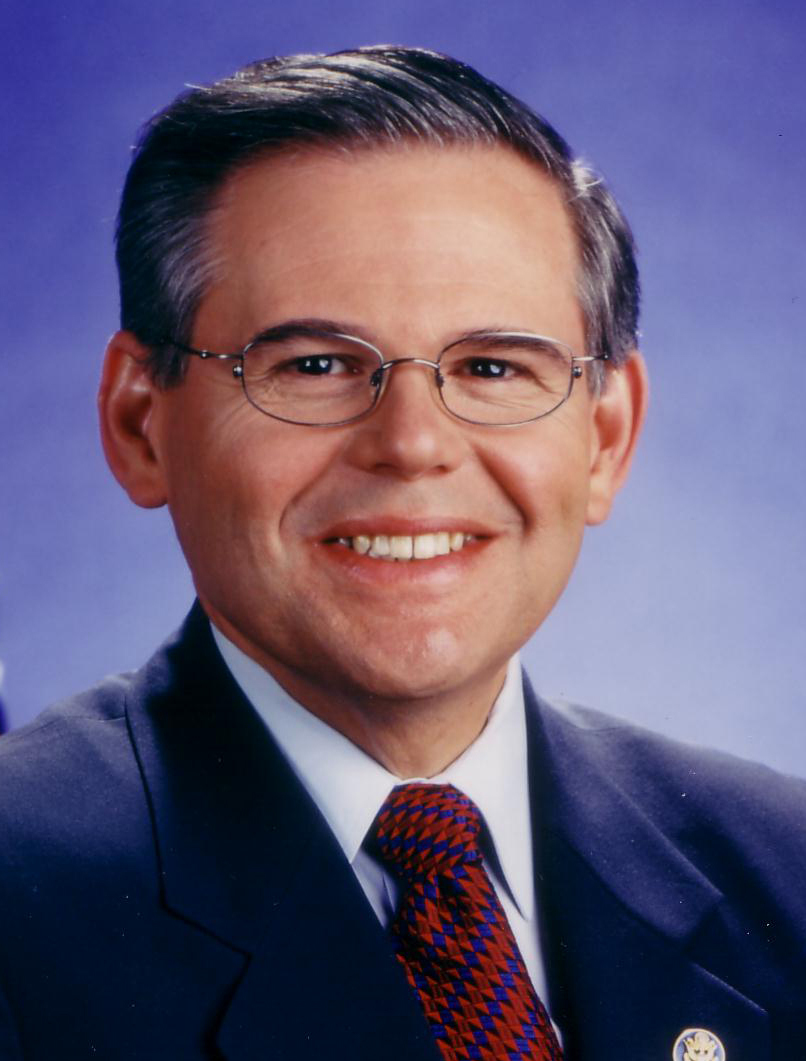

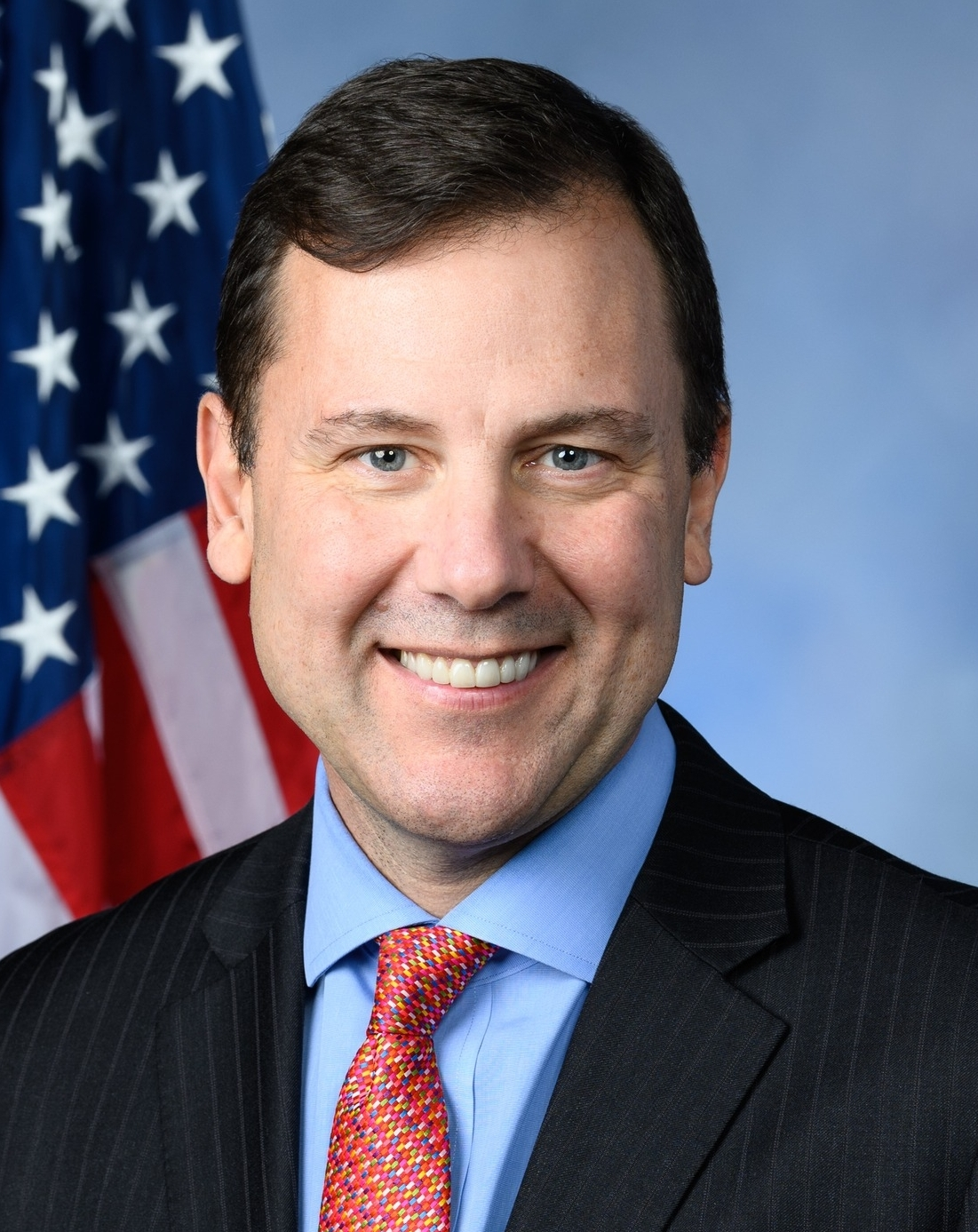
Nominee	Bob Menendez	Thomas Kean Jr.
Party	Democratic	Republican
Popular vote	1,200,843	997,775
Percentage	53.37%	44.34%
- Menendez: 50–60% 60–70% 70–80% 80–90% >90% Kean: 40–50% 50–60% 60–70% 70–80% 80–90%
U.S. senator before election
Bob Menendez (Note: In January 2006, Menendez was appointed by Governor and former Senator Jon Corzine to succeed Corzine in this seat after his election to the Governorship.)
Democratic
Elected U.S. Senator
Bob Menendez
Democratic

The 2006 United States Senate election in New Jersey was held on November 7, 2006. Bob Menendez, who had served as an interim appointee, was elected to a first full six-year term in office. He defeated Republican Thomas Kean Jr. in the general election.

The seat was previously held by Democrat Jon Corzine, who resigned in January 2006 after being sworn in as Governor of New Jersey and appointed Menendez, a U.S. Representative, to the vacant seat. Filing for the primary closed on April 10. The primary election was held June 6. Menendez and Kean both won their primaries with minimal opposition. Menendez was the first Latino elected to statewide office. Kean would later be elected to the U.S House of Representatives in 2022.

== Democratic primary ==
=== Candidates ===
- James D. Kelly, telecommunications worker and candidate for Governor in 2005
- Bob Menendez, interim U.S. senator and former U.S. representative from Union City

=== Results ===
2006 Democratic Senate Primary
Party	Candidate	Votes	%
Democratic	Bob Menendez (incumbent)	159,604	84.03%
Democratic	James D. Kelly	30,340	15.97%
Total votes		189,944	100.00%

== Republican primary ==
=== Candidates ===
- John P. Ginty, associate director with Standard & Poor's
- Thomas Kean, Jr., state senator from Westfield and son of former governor Thomas Kean

Ginty represented the conservative wing of the New Jersey Republican Party. Kean ran as a moderate.

=== Campaign ===
A showdown between Bergen County Republican Organization (BCRO) conservatives and a group of insurgent moderate Republican critics ignited into a shoving match between supporters, with Kean temporarily refusing to accept the BCRO endorsement of his candidacy, and refusing to run with the organization slate of nominees for the offices of County Executive, Surrogate, and Freeholder. As a result, Ginty was drafted by Bergen County conservatives to fill out the conservative slate of candidates in Bergen County for the Republican primary. Kean eventually accepted the BCRO endorsement.

On March 20, Kean arrived late to a fundraising event for his campaign, after featured guest Vice President Dick Cheney had left, which some accused of him doing deliberately to avoid the chance of photographs of the two together.

On March 27, at a news conference billed as a "major announcement," Kean called for state and federal tax cuts, asking Menendez and Governor of New Jersey Jon Corzine to support them. In response, a spokesman for Menendez said the senator supports "balanced tax cuts," not just ones that benefit the wealthiest Americans while expanding national debt.

On April 1, at the Middlesex County Republican Convention, Kean won the Middlesex County Republican Organization endorsement for the Republican nomination for U.S. Senate over Ginty by a vote of 79% to 21%.

On May 2, Ginty publicly called on Kean to stop soliciting the endorsement of the Sierra Club, which he termed an "environmental extremist group with a deep history of involvement in left-wing causes." Ginty announced that he favors oil exploration in Arctic National Wildlife Refuge, something that Kean and Menendez both opposed.

=== Results ===
2006 Republican Senate Primary
Party	Candidate	Votes	%
Republican	Thomas Kean Jr.	129,794	75.63%
Republican	James P. Ginty	41,828	24.37%
Total votes		171,622	100.00%

== General election ==
=== Candidates ===
- Daryl Mikell Brooks, candidate for New Jersey's 12th congressional district in 2004 (Poor People's Campaign)
- J.M. Carter, minister and candidate for U.S. Senate in 2000 (God We Trust)
- Len Flynn, activist (Libertarian)
- Ed Forchion, marijuana legalization activist (Marijuana)
- Thomas Kean Jr., state senator from Westfield and son of former governor Thomas Kean (Republican)
- Angela L. Lariscy, sewing machine operator and trade unionist (Socialist Workers)
- Bob Menendez, interim U.S. senator and former U.S. representative from Union City (Democratic)
- Gregory Pason, activist and former union official (Socialist)
- N. Leonard Smith, former Camden County freeholder, retired teacher, and Korean War veteran (Solidarity, Defend Life)

=== Campaign ===
The general election contest largely pitted Kean, running a campaign critical of Menendez's reputation for ethical ambiguity, against Menendez, who focused on national political issues, including the unpopularity of George W. Bush and the Iraq War in New Jersey. Kean and the Republican Party focused their campaign on Menendez's poor ethical reputation. In 2005, op-eds in The New York Times and the Star-Ledger complained of bossism by Menendez, claiming he runs Hudson County as a political machine. The Bergen Record made an issue of Menendez's campaign spending, claiming the majority of his recent spending was not for traditional campaign activities.

In mid-summer, Jon Corzine and the Democratic state legislature held a brief shutdown of state government, which ultimately resulted in a sales tax increase.

On June 13, Kean held a fundraiser in Ocean County featuring First Lady Laura Bush, at which both Kean and Bush noted Kean's political distance from President George W. Bush, claiming that Senator Menendez seems to confuse the two.

On June 16, at a New Jersey Association of Counties speaking event in Atlantic City, Kean and his aides beat a hasty retreat from the ballroom engagement and "stampeded" into an elevator in an abortive attempt to avoid the press, only to exit on the same floor as they had entered. Kean declined to answer questions about the scathing attacks on his integrity which his opponent had delivered minutes earlier, instead opting to repeat "a few slogans."

In late June, the Associated Press reported that Kean's campaign was planning to produce a film accusing Menendez of involvement in a New Jersey mob-connected kickback scheme "despite public records and statements disputing that claim." The AP noted that "[f]our former federal prosecutors who oversaw the case have said Menendez was never involved in any wrongdoing." The New York Times reported that the charges conflicted with historical accounts and records portraying Menendez as a crusader against the very corruption of which he stood accused. The film was never completed.

On August 27, two Republican state lawmakers filed an ethics complaint against Menendez, alleging he broke conflict-of-interest rules as a State Senator and U.S. Representative rented property out to a nonprofit agency that receives federal funds. Menendez helped the organization win designation as a Federally Qualified Health Center in 1998. That designation allowed the agency to receive additional federal grants. Menendez allies noted that the organization in question, the North Hudson Community Action Corp., which provides social services and health care to the poor and was founded in 1960, had received federal funding for years before Menendez was in Congress, and receives its funding based on mathematical formulas. Menendez maintains that he rented the property out below market-value because "he was supportive of its work". The total rent collected over nine years was over $300,000. Menendez questioned the timing of the complaints: "We have seen an orchestrated series of leaks, bogus ethics complaints and outright fabrications since the beginning of this campaign." Menendez maintained that he received verbal clearance from the House Ethics Committee in 1994 before entering a lease agreement with the nonprofit.

On September 8, Menendez identified Mark Davis as the House Ethics Committee lawyer whom he consulted, but Roll Call reported that Davis left the ethics committee in 1993, prompting Menendez campaign spokesman Matt Miller to offer an alternate explanation: "It was his recollection that he talked to him about this, but it must have been someone else. It was 12 years ago." In September, U.S. Attorney Chris Christie subpoenaed records from the nonprofit. Some Democrats criticized the investigation, particularly the timing of the investigation and news leaks, as politically motivated. Governor Corzine said the investigation "has the appearance of being less than objective". Kean said his campaign "absolutely" did not have any contact at any point with Christie or his office regarding the probe.

On September 15, The Star-Ledger reported that on the same day in 2005 that Kean voted to preserve a $40 million tax exemption for Horizon Blue Cross Blue Shield of New Jersey, he collected $13,300 in contributions from 17 company executives and their family members. The report noted that Kean aides denied any connection between the votes and the contributions.

On September 28, The Star-Ledger reported that Menendez had fired his closest political adviser, Donald Scarinci, for seeking favors on Menendez's behalf. A 1999 recording revealed Scarinci asking a Hudson County psychiatrist, Oscar Sandoval, to hire another physician as a favor to Menendez. Scarinci also stated that he had helped Davila Colon, a former Menendez staffer, get a job with Carl Goldberg, a developer and major Menendez fundraiser. A spokesperson for the Menendez campaign stated that "Scarinci was using Menendez's name without his authorization or his knowledge."

Around that time, Democratic blog Blue Jersey alleged that a member of the Kean campaign was posing as a disillusioned Democrat when posting comments critical of Menendez on the site. Major newspapers corroborated the claim, reporting that the IP address used to make the comments was identical to one used by Kean campaign spokeswoman Jill Hazelbaker in official emails. Both Hazelbaker and Kean denied that she had been involved but did not explain the connection. The same IP address was also used to make multiple edits to Wikipedia pages linking Menendez to the accusations of corruption that were a centerpiece of Kean's campaign strategy.

In October, the Kean campaign drew scrutiny over its relationship with opposition researcher Christopher Lyon. Kean staffers denied that Lyon worked for Kean directly. "I think the selective outrage here is a little laughable," said Hazelbaker, who added that Mr. Menendez's former law partner, who was at his side when he was sworn in as a senator, had been convicted of dealing cocaine.

The Kean headquarters was vandalized the night before the general election. Vandals chained and locked the doors to the headquarters and broke off keys within the locks, attempting to hinder the Kean campaign. The Menendez campaign denied any involvement.

=== Debates/forums ===
- Complete video of debate, June 25, 2006
- Complete video of forum, October 20, 2006

In mid-September, Menendez declined a national debate with Kean on the popular Sunday morning talk-show, Meet the Press. A Menendez spokesperson stated that he preferred to focus on local citizens and press. Menendez did agree to take place in three locally aired debates with Kean to be aired between October 7–17. Kean withdrew from the October 14 debate, sponsored by the League of Women Voters, insisting on a national TV debate as a condition of his participation.

Both candidates agreed to participate in a virtual debate sponsored by the nonpartisan Hall Institute of Public Policy. Beginning in July and running through Election Day in November, the institute submitted questions to the candidates and then posted their responses on its website.

=== Endorsements ===
The Sierra Club, which had endorsed both candidates in past races, endorsed Menendez, citing his "15-year, extremely strong record on many federal [environmental] issues — often achieving a League of Conservation Voters voting record of 100%."

The New Jersey Educational Association PAC also endorsed Menendez.

=== Polling ===
View source data.

Source	Date	Menendez (D)	Kean Jr. (R)
Quinnipiac	November 22, 2005	41%	39%
Rasmussen	December 7, 2005	38%	34%
Quinnipiac	December 15, 2005	44%	38%
Fairleigh Dickinson	January 16, 2006	25%	37%
Rasmussen	January 25, 2006	35%	42%
Quinnipiac	January 25, 2006	38%	36%
Strategic Vision (R)	February 8, 2006	28%	33%
Rasmussen	February 14, 2006	39%	36%
Fairleigh Dickinson	March 6, 2006	42%	37%
Strategic Vision (R)	March 10, 2006	30%	32%
Quinnipiac	March 20, 2006	40%	36%
Rasmussen	March 31, 2006	39%	41%
Rutgers/Eagleton	April 4, 2006	40%	35%
Fairleigh Dickinson	April 6, 2006	38%	42%
Strategic Vision (R)	April 14, 2006	32%	34%
Rasmussen	April 18, 2006	36%	43%
Quinnipiac	April 18–24, 2006	40%	34%
Strategic Vision (R)	May 12–14, 2006	35%	35%
Rasmussen	May 26, 2006	37%	40%
Quinnipiac	June 7–13, 2006	43%	36%
Strategic Vision (R)	June 16–18, 2006	38%	36%
Rutgers/Eagleton	June 23, 2006	42%	38%
Rasmussen	June 27, 2006	46%	40%
Strategic Vision (R)	July 12, 2006	43%	37%
Monmouth University	July 17, 2006	38%	37%
Quinnipiac	July 17, 2006	38%	40%
Fairleigh Dickinson	July 20, 2006	43%	40%
Public Opinion Strategies (R)	August 2, 2006	38%	39%
Rasmussen	August 4, 2006	44%	38%
Strategic Vision (R)	August 17, 2006	42%	40%
Fairleigh Dickinson	August 30, 2006	39%	43%
Rasmussen	August 31, 2006	39%	44%
Strategic Vision (R)	September 14, 2006	40%	44%
Quinnipiac	September 20, 2006	45%	48%
Monmouth University	September 24, 2006	38%	44%
Rasmussen	September 25, 2006	40%	41%
Rutgers/Eagleton	September 28, 2006	45%	44%
WNBC/Marist Poll	September 30, 2006	37%	42%
Mason-Dixon/MSNBC	October 2, 2006	44%	41%
Strategic Vision (R)	October 5, 2006	41%	46%
Fairleigh Dickinson	October 5, 2006	46%	39%
USA Today/Gallup	October 6, 2006	46%	43%
Quinnipiac	October 12, 2006	49%	45%
Rasmussen	October 14, 2006	42%	39%
Monmouth University	October 22, 2006	48%	39%
Mason-Dixon/McClatchy-MSNBC	October 24, 2006	45%	42%
Los Angeles Times/Bloomberg	October 24, 2006	45%	41%
Bennett, Petts & Blumenthal (D)	October 23–25, 2006	45%	36%
Rasmussen	October 25, 2006	45%	45%
CBS News/New York Times	October 26, 2006	40%	39%
Rasmussen	October 30, 2006	49%	44%
Strategic Vision (R)	October 31, 2006	43%	42%
CNN/Opinion Research Corporation	October 31, 2006	51%	44%
Quinnipiac	October 31, 2006	49%	44%
Rutgers/Eagleton	November 2, 2006	46%	42%
Reuters/Zogby International	November 2, 2006	49%	37%
Fairleigh Dickinson/PublicMind	November 2, 2006	48%	38%
Rasmussen	November 3, 2006	48%	43%
WNBC/Marist Poll	November 4, 2006	50%	42%
Monmouth University/Gannett	November 5, 2006	45%	42%
Mason-Dixon/MSNBC-McClatchy	November 5, 2006	48%	41%
USA Today/Gallup	November 5, 2006	50%	40%
Strategic Vision (R)	November 6, 2006	49%	42%
Quinnipiac	November 6, 2006	48%	43%
OnPoint Polling and Research	November 6, 2006	50%	41%

After the publication of an August 4 poll showing Menendez ahead, Kean appeared to surge into the lead according to subsequent polls by varying degrees, but within the margin of error. Fred Snowflack of the Daily Record suggested that Kean's early lead was attributable to voters confusing him with his father, Tom Kean Sr., a popular former governor of the state who later chaired the 9/11 Commission. In one poll, Kean and Menendez were statistically tied until respondents were informed that it was not Tom Sr. who was running, upon which Menendez opened up a lead of nine percentage points.

On the heels of an advertising blitz, Menendez reclaimed the lead in late polling. In light of to the race's volatility, the nonpartisan Cook Political Report, Congressional Quarterly, and Larry Sabato's Crystal Ball shifted the race from "Leans Democratic" to "Toss-Up" or "No Clear Favorite" in their early September revisions despite the state's historically strong Democratic tilt.

A September 2006 SurveyUSA poll showed Menendez's approval rating at 40% and disapproval rating at 40% with 20% undecided, resulting in a net approval of 0%. The poll also found that Governor Jon Corzine received an approval rate of only 43%, with 48% of the state disapproving.

=== Predictions ===
Source	Ranking	As of
The Cook Political Report	Tossup	November 6, 2006
Sabato's Crystal Ball	Tilt D	November 6, 2006
Rothenberg Political Report	Lean D	November 6, 2006
Real Clear Politics	Lean D	November 6, 2006

=== Results ===
United States Senate election in New Jersey, 2006
Party	Candidate	Votes	%	±%
Democratic	Bob Menendez (incumbent)	1,200,843	53.37%	+3.26%
Republican	Thomas Kean, Jr.	997,775	44.34%	−2.76%
Libertarian	Len Flynn	14,637	0.65%	+0.41%
Marijuana	Edward Forchion	11,593	0.52%	
Independent	J.M. Carter	7,918	0.35%	+0.15%
Independent	N. Leonard Smith	6,243	0.28%	
Independent	Daryl Brooks	5,138	0.23%	
Socialist Workers	Angela Lariscy	3,433	0.15%	+0.03
Socialist	Gregory Pason	2,490	0.11%	
Majority		203,068	9.03%	
Turnout		2,250,070	39.47%	
Democratic hold		Swing	3.26%	

==== By county ====
County	Bob Menendez December		Thomas Kean, Jr. Republican		Various candidates Other parties		Margin		Total votes cast
County	#	%	#	%	#	%	#	%	Total votes cast
Atlantic	34,251	50.71%	31,784	47.05%	1,512	2.24%	2,467	3.66%	70,014
Bergen	139,564	53.44%	118,199	45.26%	3,388	1.30%	21,365	8.18%	261,151
Burlington	65,788	51.76%	58,725	46.21%	2,577	2.03%	7,063	5.55%	127,090
Camden	81,577	61.68%	47,732	36.09%	2,960	2.24%	33,845	25.59%	132,269
Cape May	14,038	40.93%	19,506	56.87%	757	2.21%	-5,468	-15.94%	34,301
Cumberland	16,243	53.01%	13,537	44.18%	860	2.81%	2,706	8.83%	30,640
Essex	122,751	72.06%	45,266	26.57%	2,333	1.37%	77,485	45.49%	170,350
Gloucester	42,766	52.51%	36,559	44.89%	2,117	2.60%	6,207	7.62%	81,442
Hudson	27,536	75.13%	88,696	23.32%	1,832	1.55%	61,160	51.81%	118,064
Hunterdon	16,873	38.15%	25,531	57.73%	1,823	4.12%	-8,658	-19.58%	62,799
Mercer	56,111	60.01%	34,958	37.39%	2,435	2.60%	21,153	22.62%	142,041
Middlesex	102,198	57.92%	68,734	38.96%	5,512	3.12%	33,464	18.96%	176,444
Monmouth	81,672	44.68%	96,247	52.65%	4,882	2.67%	-14,575	-7.97%	182,801
Morris	61,431	41.00%	85,656	57.17%	2,738	1.83%	-24,225	-16.17%	149,825
Ocean	64,621	39.85%	92,819	57.24%	4,730	2.92%	-28,198	-17.39%	162,170
Passaic	58,333	57.20%	41,998	41.19%	1,642	1.61%	16,335	16.01%	101,973
Salem	9,898	46.52%	10,576	49.71%	802	3.77%	-678	-3.19%	21,276
Somerset	42,242	46.01%	46,720	50.89%	2,839	3.09%	-4,478	-4.88%	91,801
Sussex	14,839	34.68%	26,185	61.19%	1,769	4.13%	-11,346	-26.51%	42,793
Union	75,166	57.65%	52,496	40.26%	2,732	2.10%	22,670	17.39%	130,394
Warren	10,785	37.18%	17,011	58.64%	1,212	4.18%	-6,226	-21.46%	29,008
Totals	1,200,843	53.37%	997,775	44.34%	51,452	2.29%	203,068	9.03%	2,250,070

County that flipped from Republican to Democratic

- Bergen (largest municipality: Hackensack)
- Burlington (largest municipality: Evesham Township)

== Analysis ==
According to The New York Times, Kean was defeated in part because he "built a campaign around his portrayal of Mr. Menendez as a shady, self-dealing, machine-produced Hudson County boss who hangs out with criminals. When asked about his views on Social Security or the Iraq war, Mr. Kean frequently mentioned that his opponent was 'under federal criminal investigation.'" A later Times editorial said, "The Republican candidate, Thomas Kean Jr., based his campaign almost exclusively on negative ads and attack-dog accusations against his Democratic opponent, Robert Menendez. For a while, it looked like the strategy might pay off, but in the end Senator Menendez was elected by a comfortable margin. Voters in several polls criticized Mr. Kean's strategy."

Kean likely also suffered from the unpopularity of Republican President George W. Bush and the Iraq War. Some pollsters demonstrated that concerns over the Iraq War and discontent with President Bush solidified the Democratic base in October's advertising blitz and won over enough independents to seal off the fate of the Republican nominee. On the eve of the election, a Fairleigh Dickinson University poll reported that 65% of likely voters said that the invasion of Iraq was a mistake, "including nine of ten Democrats and six of ten independents." Observers also pointed out that "from the beginning, [Menendez] made much of his 2002 vote against the Iraq War Resolution, often referring to it as one of the most important votes of his career. He made it clear as well that he intended to make the race a referendum on the President."

The ethical issues raised during the campaign did convince U.S. Attorney Chris Christie to open a criminal investigation into Menendez. In 2015, Menendez was indicted on unrelated federal corruption charges, which were dropped in 2018. The United States Senate Select Committee on Ethics "severely admonished" him.

== See also ==
- 2006 United States Senate elections
