= Jimmy Lyon =

Jimmy Lyon may refer to:

- Jimmy Lyon (guitarist) (born 1955) also known as James Douglas Lyon, American rock guitarist
- Jimmy Lyon (pianist) (1921–1984), American jazz pianist
- James E. Lyon (1927–1993), also known as Jimmy Lyon, American banker, real estate developer, politician

== See also ==
- Jimmy Lyons (disambiguation)
- James Lyon (disambiguation)
- James Lyons (disambiguation)
- Lyon (surname)
- Lyons (surname)
