= Senator Lyons =

Senator Lyons may refer to:

- Edward H. Lyons (1855–1920), Wisconsin State Senate
- Isaiah L. Lyons (1843–1871), Virginia State Senate
- James Lyons (Virginia politician) (1801–1882), Virginia State Senate
- John R. Lyons (1860–1929), Arizona State Senate
- Owen P. Lyons (1849–1933), Maine State Senate
- Patrick H. Lyons (born 1953), New Mexico State Senate
- Thomas G. Lyons (1831–2007), Illinois State Senate
- Virginia V. Lyons (born 1944), Vermont State Senate
- William D. Lyons (1920–1971), Illinois State Senate
- William J. Lyons Jr. (1921–2014), Connecticut State Senate

== See also ==
- Senator Lyon (disambiguation)
