= Senator Lynn =

Senator Lynn may refer to:

- Evelyn J. Lynn (born 1930), Florida State Senate
- Julia Lynn (born 1957), Kansas State Senate

== See also ==
- Senator Lyon (disambiguation)
- Seybourn Arthur Lynne (1877–?), Alabama State Senate
