= Arthur Lyon =

Arthur Lyon may refer to:

- Arthur Lyon (fencer) (1876–1952), American fencer
- Arthur Lyon (rugby union) (1851–1905), England rugby union international
- Arthur Sidney Lyon (1817–1861), Australian journalist and newspaper proprietor
- Arthur Anderson Lyon (1876–1962), founder of Arthur Lyon & Co.

== See also ==
- Arthur Lyon Bowley (1869–1957), English statistician and economist
- Arthur Lyon Cross (1873–1940), American historian

== Companies ==
- Arthur Lyon & Co (ALCO), British manufacturer of generator sets
