= Colby, Wisconsin =

- City
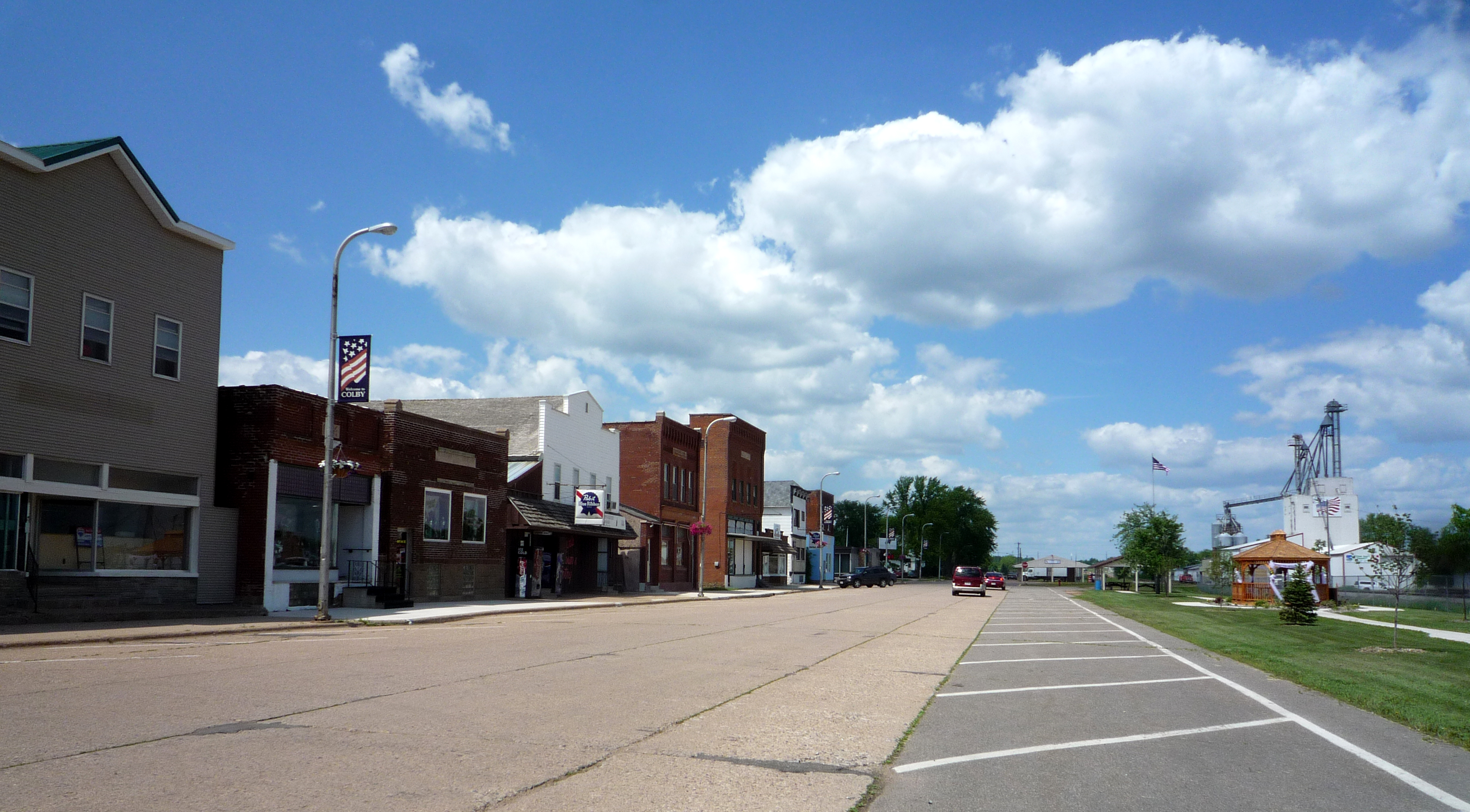
- Downtown Colby
- Motto(s): "A Growing Community Proud of Its Heritage" "Home of Colby Cheese"
- Location of Colby in Clark County and Marathon County, Wisconsin.

- Location within Wisconsin Location within the United States
- Coordinates: 44°54′37″N 90°19′1″W
- Country: United States
- State: Wisconsin
- Counties: Clark, Marathon

Area
  - Total: 1.64 sq mi (4.26 km^{2})
  - Land: 1.64 sq mi (4.25 km^{2})
  - Water: 0.0039 sq mi (0.01 km^{2})
- Elevation: 1,352 ft (412 m)

Population (2020)
  - Total: 1,952
  - Estimate (2022): 2,132
  - Density: 1,190/sq mi (459.5/km^{2})
- Time zone: UTC-6 (Central (CST))
  - Summer (DST): UTC-5 (CDT)
- Zip code(s): 54421
- Area codes: 715 & 534
- FIPS code: 55-16150
- GNIS feature ID: 1563232
- Website: www.ci.colby.wi.us

Colby is a city in Clark and Marathon counties in the U.S. state of Wisconsin. It is part of the Wausau, Wisconsin Metropolitan Statistical Area. The population was 1,952 at the 2020 census. Of this, 1,275 were in Clark County, and 677 were in Marathon County. The city is bordered by the Town of Colby, the Town of Hull, and the City of Abbotsford. Colby cheese was first created in Colby.

== History ==
When the Wisconsin Central Railroad was building its line through the wilderness heading toward Lake Superior, it finished its 1872 construction season with rails completed to the site of today's Colby. The place was initially called "Section 53," but the railroad renamed the station in honor of Charles L. Colby, partner in the construction company that was building the railroad, and the son of the railroad's financier Gardner L. Colby.

As early as 1962, the area was home to Colby-Abbotsford Airport, a private facility with a 2600 ft runway running northeast–southwest and the remnants of a shorter northwest–southeast runway. The airport remained in operation as late as 1988, but has since been abandoned.

Colby is the birthplace of Colby cheese. A historical marker in downtown Colby commemorates the development of Colby cheese by Joseph Steinwand in 1874.

== Geography ==
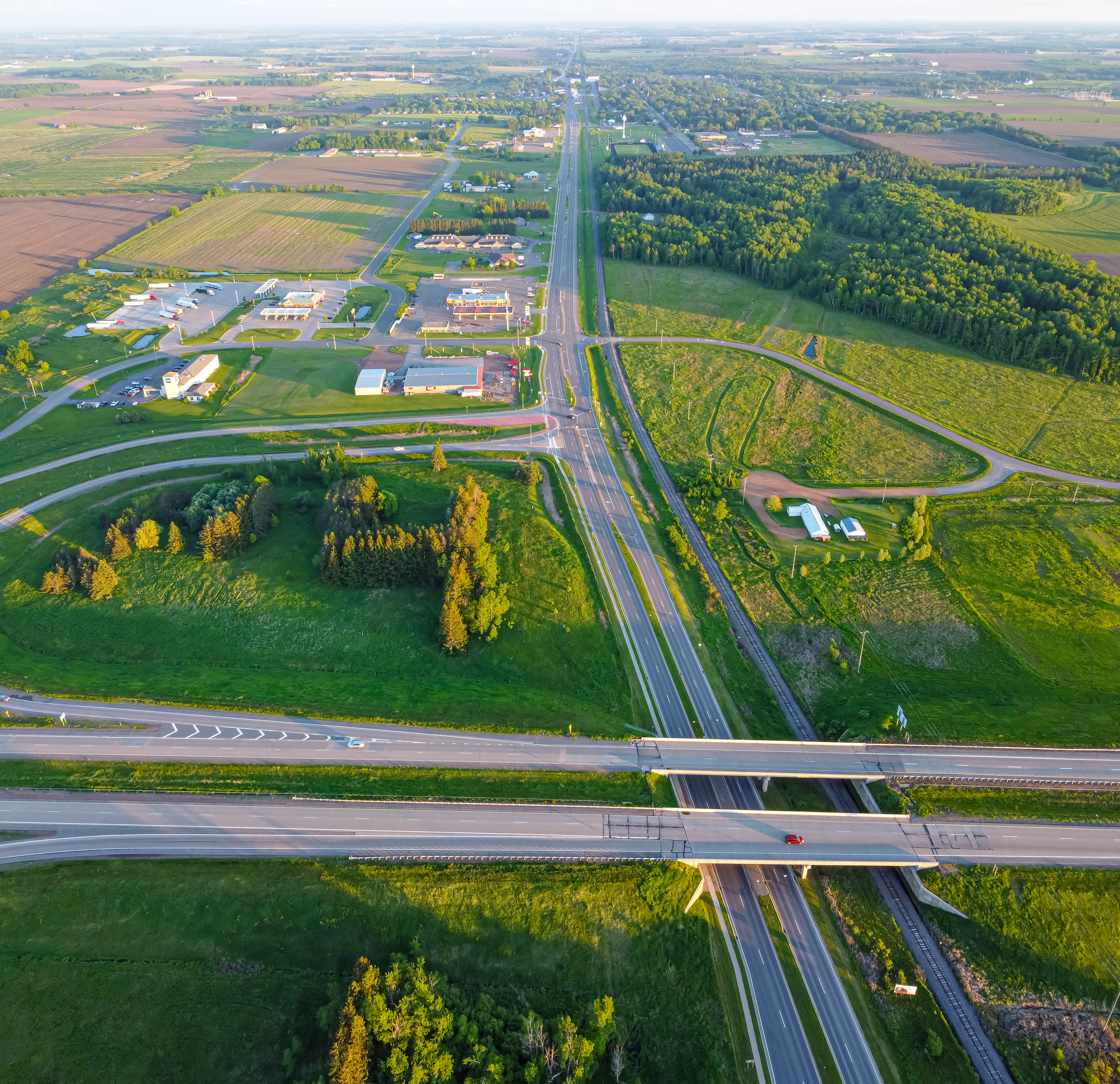
Looking south from Wis-29 down Wis-13

Colby is located at 44°54′36″N 90°19′1″W (44.910186, -90.317058).

According to the United States Census Bureau, the city has a total area of 1.57 square miles (4.07 km^{2}), of which 1.56 square miles (4.04 km^{2}) is land and 0.01 square miles (0.03 km^{2}) is water.

== Demographics ==
Historical population
Census	Pop.	Note	%±
1880	259		—
1900	667		—
1910	869		30.3%
1920	798		−8.2%
1930	849		6.4%
1940	903		6.4%
1950	989		9.5%
1960	1,085		9.7%
1970	1,178		8.6%
1980	1,496		27.0%
1990	1,532		2.4%
2000	1,616		5.5%
2010	1,852		14.6%
2020	1,952		5.4%
2022 (est.)	2,132		9.2%
U.S. Decennial Census

=== 2020 census ===
As of the census of 2020, there were 1,952 people and 792 households living in the city. The population density was 1,190.2 inhabitants per square mile (459.5/km^{2}). There were 834 housing units at an average density of 508.5 per square mile (196.3/km^{2}). The racial makeup of the city was 77.2% White, 0.5% African American, 0.9% Native American, 0.5% Asian, 0.0% Pacific Islander, 13.1% from other races, and 7.8% from two or more races. Hispanic or Latino of any race were 20.6% of the population.

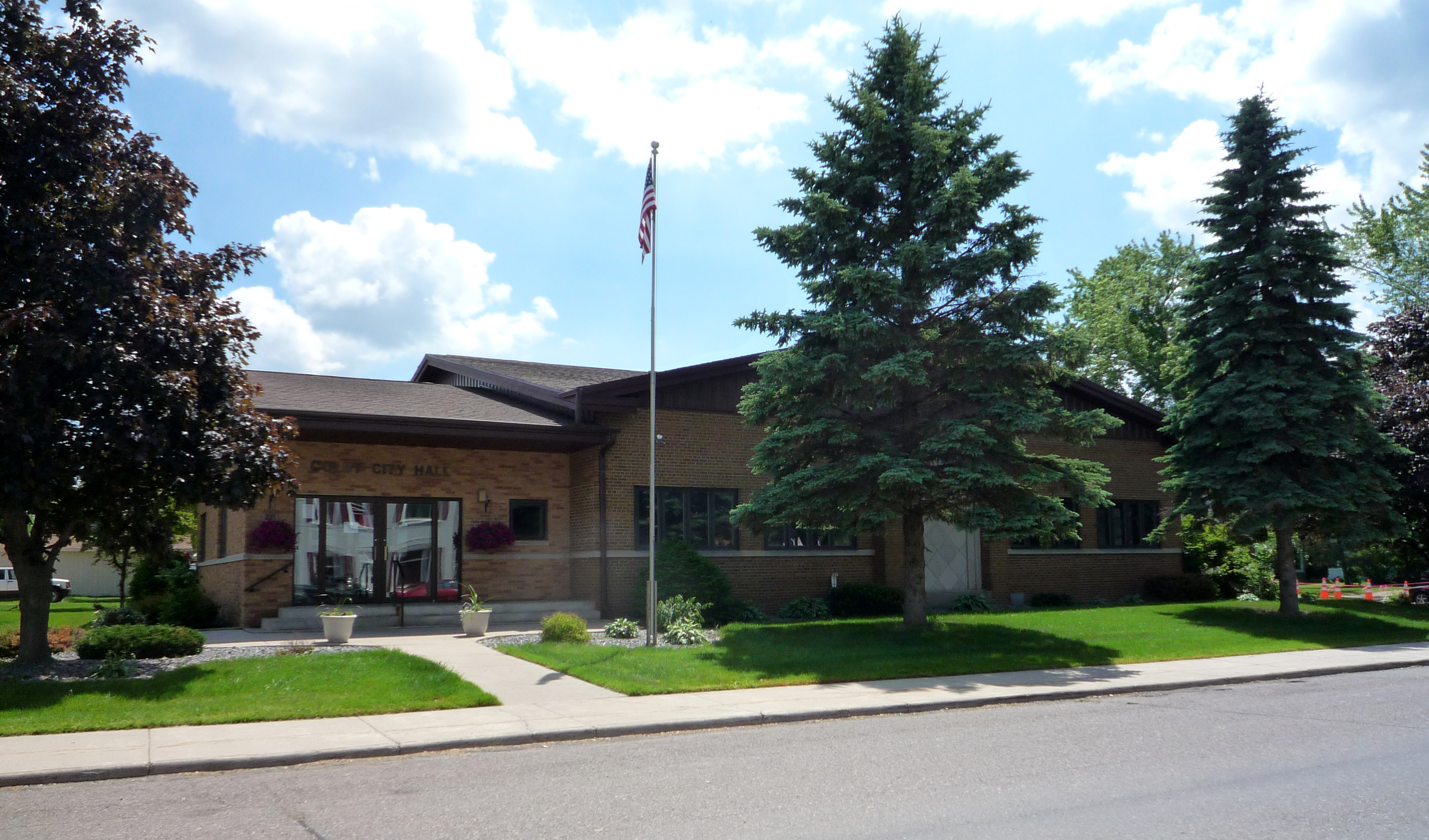
Colby City Hall

There were 792 households, of which 28.4% had children under the age of 18 living with them, 44.2% were married couples living together, 29.2% had a female householder with no husband present, 17.4% had a male householder with no wife present, and 9.2% were non-families. 34.0% of all households were made up of individuals, and 18.2% had someone living alone who was 65 years of age or older. The average household size was 2.46.

The median age in the city was 38.6 years. 26.0% of residents were under the age of 18; 20.9% of residents were over the age of 65. The gender makeup of the city was 48.7% male and 51.2% female.

=== 2010 census ===
As of the census of 2010, there were 1,852 people, 714 households, and 474 families living in the city. The population density was 1,187.2 inhabitants per square mile (458.4/km^{2}). There were 757 housing units at an average density of 485.3 per square mile (187.4/km^{2}). The racial makeup of the city was 89.4% White, 0.6% African American, 0.4% Native American, 0.5% Asian, 0.1% Pacific Islander, 8.6% from other races, and 0.5% from two or more races. Hispanic or Latino of any race were 11.9% of the population.

There were 714 households, of which 32.6% had children under the age of 18 living with them, 52.2% were married couples living together, 9.2% had a female householder with no husband present, 4.9% had a male householder with no wife present, and 33.6% were non-families. 27.9% of all households were made up of individuals, and 15.6% had someone living alone who was 65 years of age or older. The average household size was 2.46 and the average family size was 2.99.

The median age in the city was 36.9 years. 25.1% of residents were under the age of 18; 8.6% were between the ages of 18 and 24; 24.6% were from 25 to 44; 21.7% were from 45 to 64; and 20% were 65 years of age or older. The gender makeup of the city was 48.1% male and 51.9% female.

=== 2000 census ===
As of the census of 2000, there were 1,616 people, 623 households, and 423 families living in the city. The population density was 1,090.1 people per square mile (421.6/km^{2}). There were 645 housing units at an average density of 435.1 per square mile (168.3/km^{2}). The racial makeup of the city was 96.53% White, 0.19% Black or African American, 0.37% Native American, 0.43% Asian, 1.73% from other races, and 0.74% from two or more races. Hispanic or Latino of any race were 3.84% of the population.

There were 623 households, out of which 33.5% had children under the age of 18 living with them, 55.9% were married couples living together, 8.0% had a female householder with no husband present, and 32.1% were non-families. 28.4% of all households were made up of individuals, and 19.1% had someone living alone who was 65 years of age or older. The average household size was 2.43 and the average family size was 2.96.

In the city, the population was distributed with 25.1% under the age of 18, 6.7% from 18 to 24, 25.4% from 25 to 44, 18.5% from 45 to 64, and 24.2% who were 65 years of age or older. The median age was 40 years. For every 100 females, there were 87.3 males. For every 100 females age 18 and over, there were 82.2 males.

The median income for a household in the city was $34,318, and the median income for a family was $41,685. Males had a median income of $30,530 versus $21,806 for females. The per capita income for the city was $16,137. About 3.7% of families and 7.0% of the population were below the poverty line, including 6.1% of those under age 18 and 16.2% of those age 65 or over. Colby, is split between one of the richest counties, (Marathon) and one of the poorest (Clark) in the state of Wisconsin.

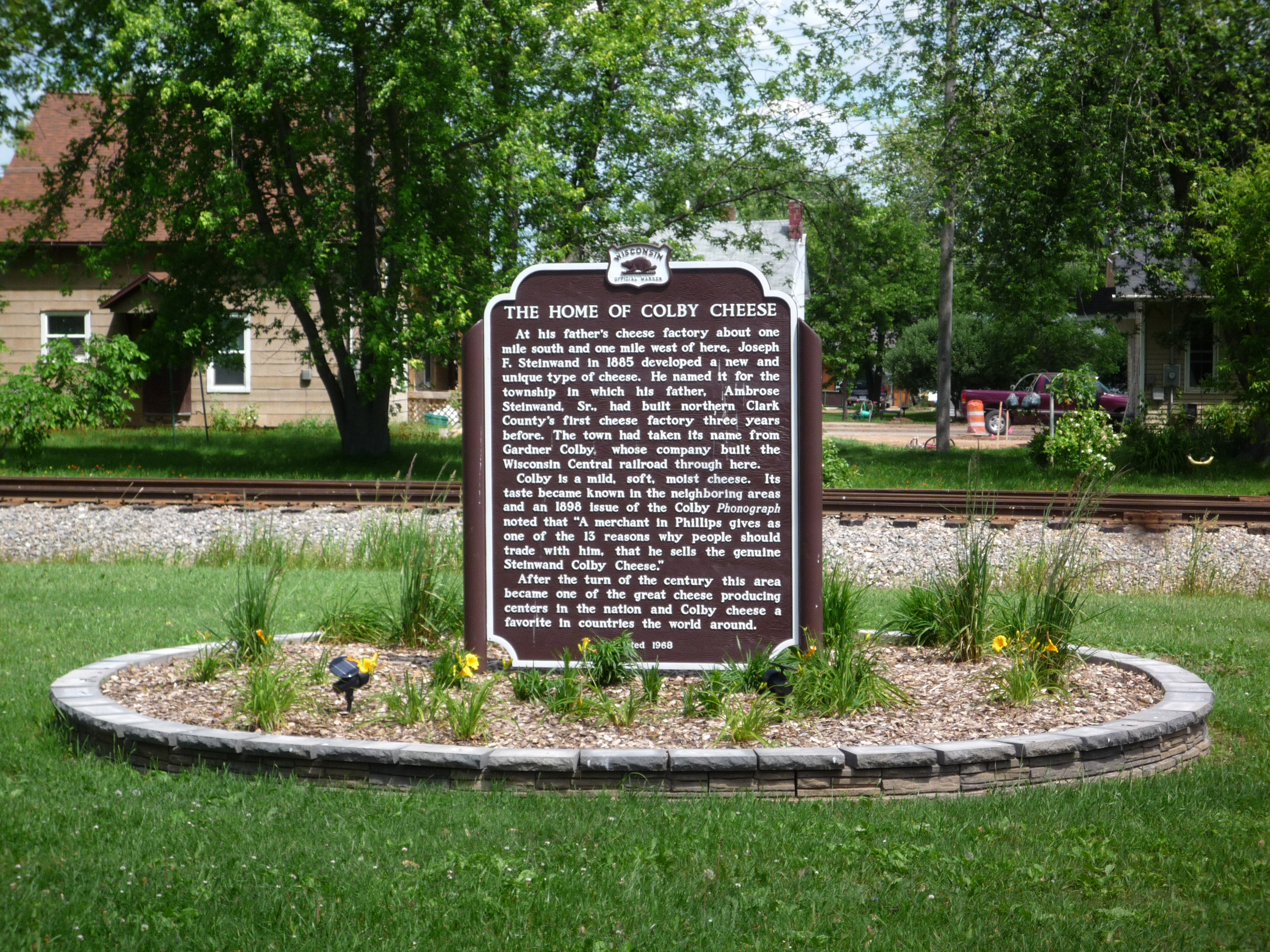
Colby cheese historical marker

== Education ==
Colby is part of the Colby School District. Schools in the district include a preschool, elementary school, middle school and high school. Students attend Colby High School. Also located within the city is St. Mary's Catholic School, which serves students from 1st through 8th grade. The private and public schools have collaborative sports and band programs.

== Events ==
Since 1961 Colby has put on the Colby Cheese Days festival on the third weekend in July. Events include a softball tournament, tractor pull, carnival rides, bingo, cheese-curd throwing contest, a fun-run, and finally a parade. Free cheese is distributed by vendors and food stands.

The Colby High School choir program holds the Central Wisconsin Show Choir Spectacular the first Saturday in January. The competition hosts show choirs, and was recognized as a top regional competition in 2018.

== Notable people ==
- Kirk Baumgartner (born 1967), NAIA college football All-American at the University of Wisconsin–Stevens Point
- Todd Boss (born 1968), poet
- George Washington Blanchard (1884 - 1964), U.S. congressman
- James E. Lyons (1857 - 1943), Wisconsin State Representative and Mayor of Colby
- Joseph Weix (1874 - 1925), Wisconsin State Representative

== Images ==
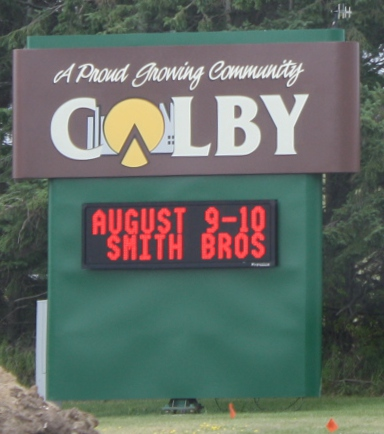
Welcome sign

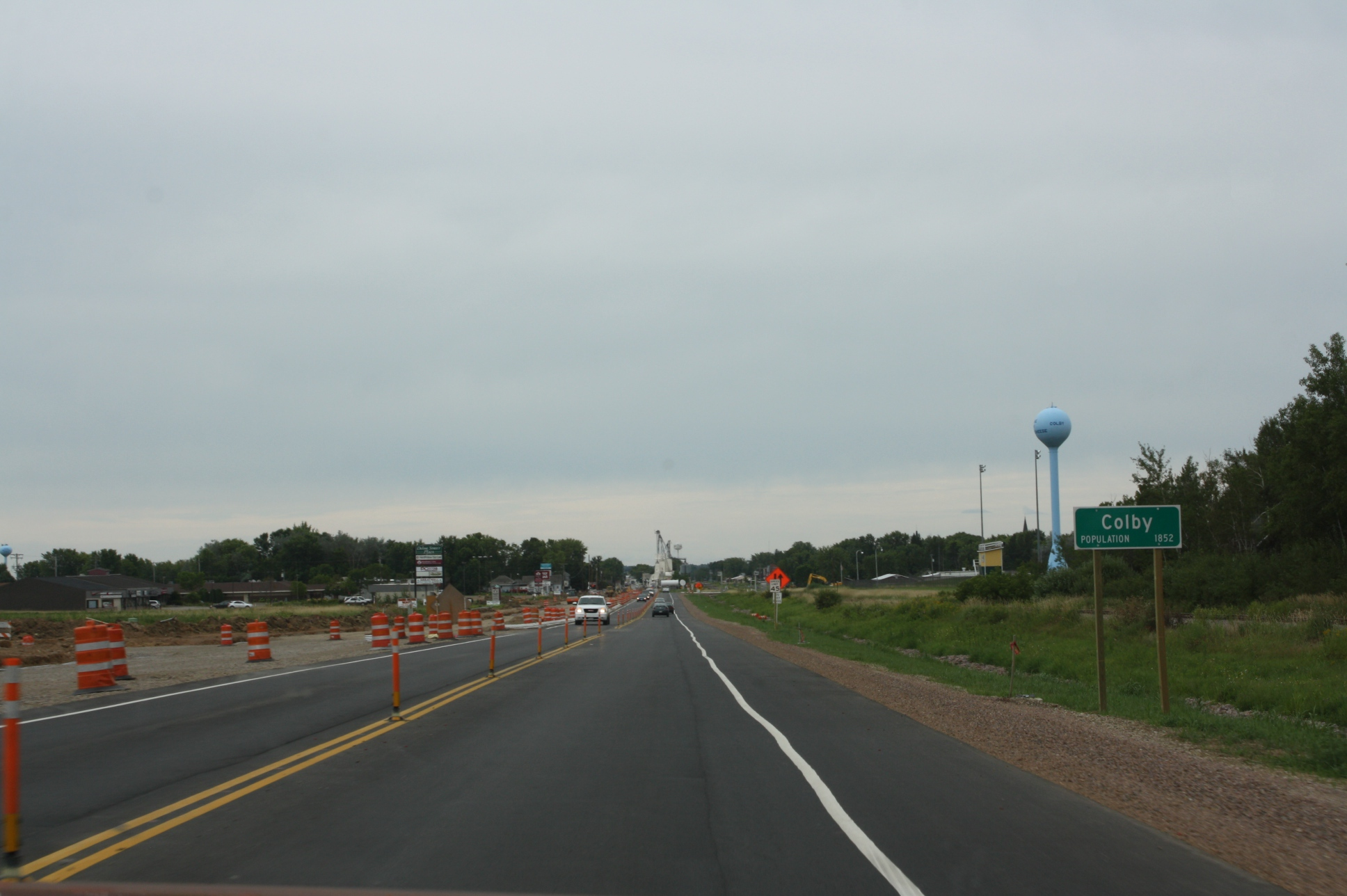
Sign
