= Hotel Galvez =

Historic hotel in Galveston, Texas, USA

- Galvez Hotel
- U.S. National Register of Historic Places
- Recorded Texas Historic Landmark
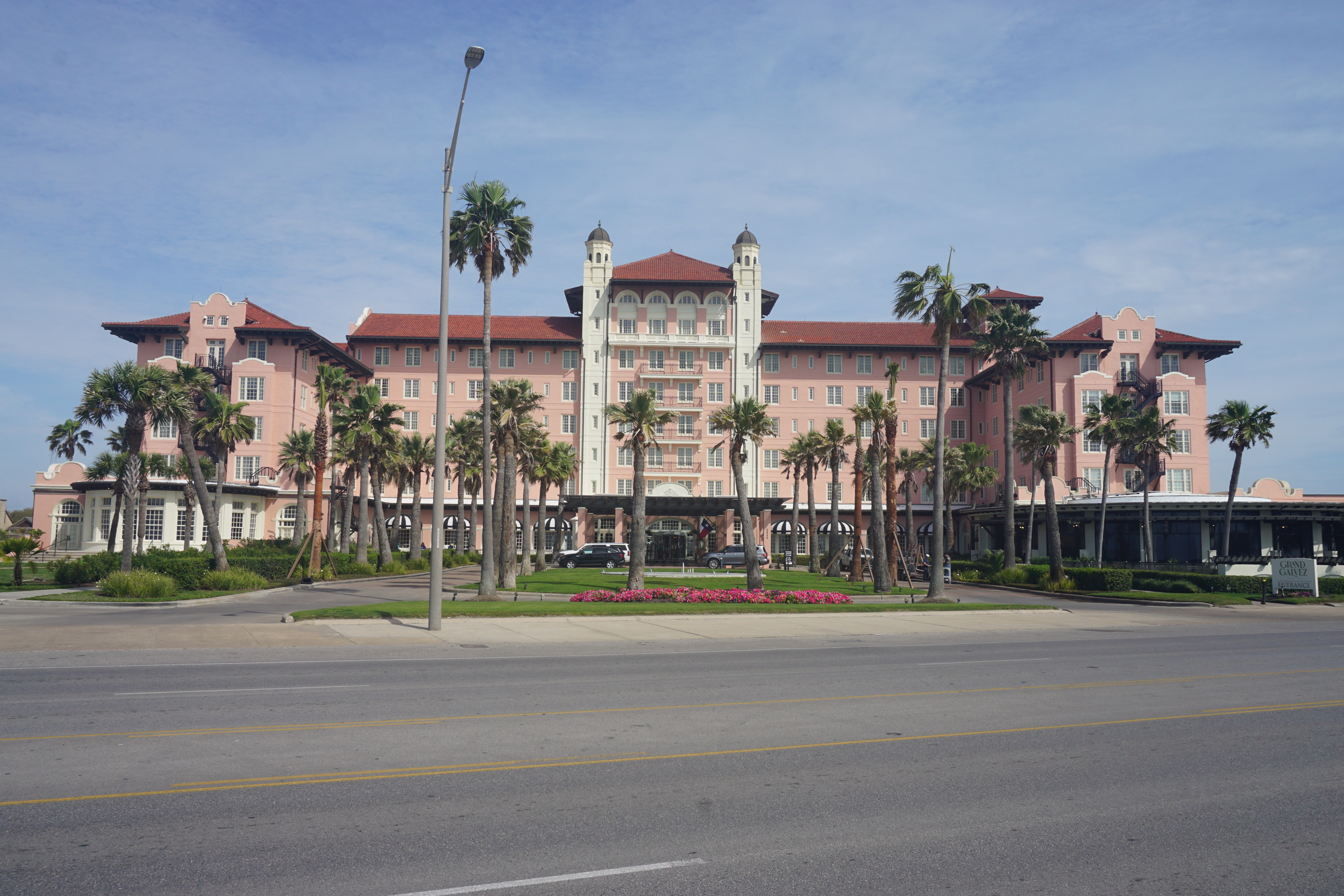
- Grand Galvez Resort & Spa in 2022

- Location within Texas Location within the United States
- Location: 2024 Seawall Blvd., Galveston, Texas
- Coordinates: 29°17′32″N 94°47′8″W
- Area: 3 acres (1.2 ha)
- Built: 1910
- Architect: Mauran & Russell
- Architectural style: Mission/Spanish Revival
- NRHP reference No.: 79002944
- RTHL No.: 7494

Significant dates
- Added to NRHP: April 4, 1979
- Designated RTHL: 1980

The Grand Galvez Resort & Spa is a historic 226-room resort hotel located in Galveston, Texas, United States that opened in 1911 as the Hotel Galvez. It was named to honor Bernardo de Gálvez, 1st Viscount of Galveston, for whom the city was named. The hotel was added to the National Register of Historic Places on April 4, 1979. It is a member of Historic Hotels of America, the official program of the National Trust for Historic Preservation.

== Architecture ==
The Hotel Galvez is a six-story building made of stucco-covered brick, built in the style of Spanish Colonial Revival architecture. It features distinctive elements of this architectural style, such as mission parapets, plastered walls, and a Ludowici tile roof.

The main building features two five-story wings jutting toward the Gulf of Mexico. These wings include round archways and windows in the Spanish Revival style. The hotel's original main entrance faced north, away from the Gulf, and featured a porte cochere.

== History ==
=== Beach Hotel ===
Preceding the Hotel Galvez overlooking the beach was the Beach Hotel, designed by Nicholas J. Clayton and completed in 1883. It was located on Tremont Street. The Beach Hotel was similar in style to some of the grand hotels built in the 1870s, the San Francisco Palace, the United States Hotel, and the Grand Union Hotel. Clayton equipped the Beach hotel with a mansard tower, a feature that he has also installed on the St. Mary's Infirmary in 1874. The three stories and three pavilions of the Beach Hotel rested on a base of 300 piles, arranged in three octagonal structures surrounding a rectangle, decorated in a polychrome-stick style.

The Beach Hotel operated until 1895, followed by brief re-openings in 1896 and another renovation by Georg Korst in preparation for another opening in 1898. However, a boiler room fire on July 22 consumed the entire hotel. Firefighters saved a restaurant and a small shop on adjacent blocks, but flames crossing another street spread to another shop and a restaurant, which were total losses. The Beach Hotel was never rebuilt.

=== Seawall ===
The 1900 Galveston hurricane struck Galveston on September 8. Storm surge reached fifteen feet. At one point during the storm, the wind shifted to blow from the north, pushing the tides in Galveston Bay back into the city, as Galveston received surging water from the north and the south. About 6,000 people died in Galveston alone. Within days after the storm, the Deep Water Committee convened to consider plans for protecting the city from hurricanes. The three engineers on the committee recommended a concrete seawall to protect the city from storm surge. By 1903, Galveston was selling infrastructure bonds and raising revenue from authority granted by the State of Texas. Construction on the seawall began in February. The seawall was built to seventeen feet in height, flared from a fifteen-foot base to five feet at the top.

The Robert Board, the three engineers tasked with the planning of the seawall for the City of Galveston, hired J. M. O'Rourke and Company of Denver as the construction contractor. They completed the initial segment in 1904. While the seawall was under construction, a second complementary project was under way to raise the level of land on the east end of the island, by jacking up the existing structures and underfilling them with slurry. The land behind the seawall, including the site of the former Beach Hotel was raised by 16.5 feet. The entire seawall and the landfill projects were completed in 1910.

=== Hotel Galvez ===
==== Development ====
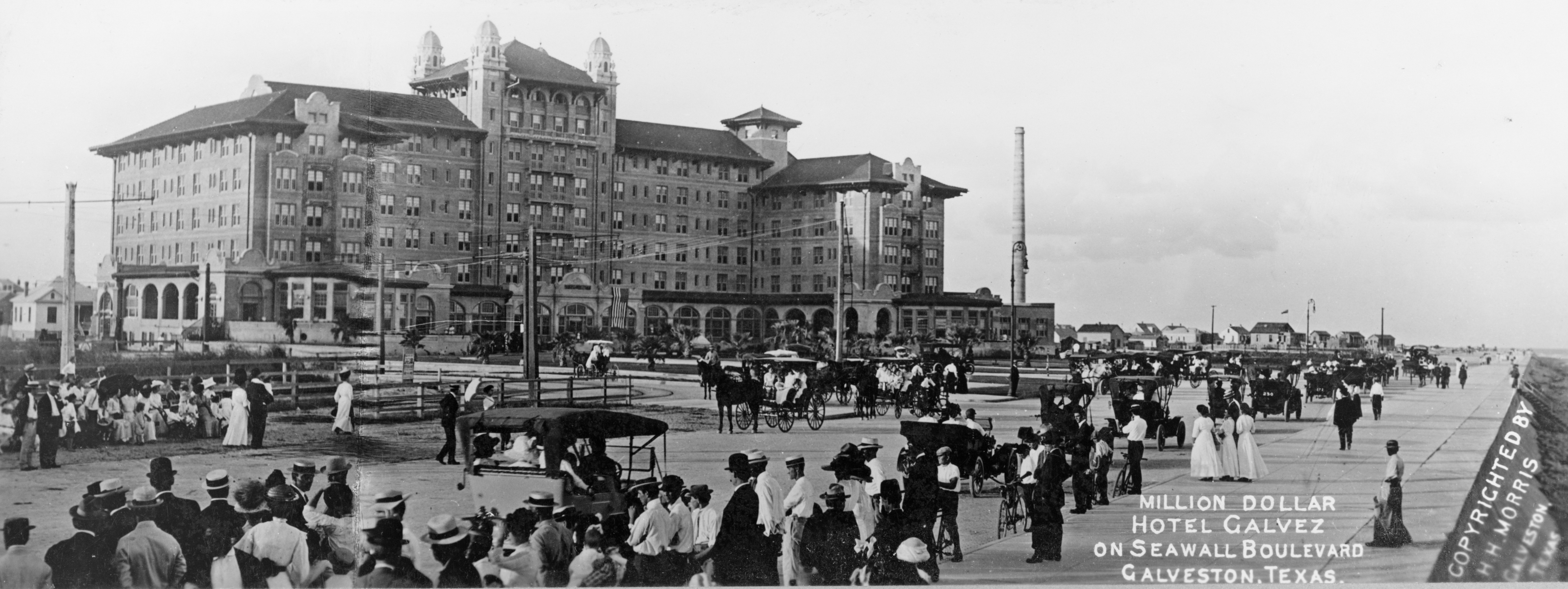
The hotel c. 1911

An organizational meeting convened in Galveston on February 13, 1910 for the purpose of raising capital and planning a resort hotel overlooking the new seawall. Isaac Herbert Kempner, John Hutchings Sealy, Bertrand Adoue, and Joseph Lobit each pledged a $50,000 investment from their firms. By March, the project raised more than $500,000. After a design committee was appointed, Mauran & Russell of St. Louis was chosen as the architecture firm for the hotel. Meanwhile, the board also contracted with Daniel Philip Ritchey, a hotel design consultant to collaborate with Mauran & Russell.

While the board considered naming it the Galveston Beach Hotel, they rejected any name including "beach" because it suggested a greater exposure to the weather and also that it would be open only during the summer months. Instead, they chose "Galvez Hotel" for the namesake of Galveston Island, Bernardo de Gálvez.

Galveston civic leaders began plans to build the Hotel Galvez in 1898, after a fire destroyed another large hotel overlooking the beach (the Beach Hotel). After the devastating Hurricane of 1900, which killed approximately 6,000 Galveston Island residents and leveled most of the buildings on the island, the plans accelerated, in order to draw tourists back to the island. The hotel occupies the site where the Beach Hotel, Electric Pavilion, and Pagoda Bathhouse once stood. The hotel was designed by Mauran, Russell & Crowell of St. Louis, Missouri, in a combination of Mission Revival and Spanish Revival styles and was constructed at a cost of $1 million. The Hotel Galvez opened in June 1911.

==== Opening ====
The Galveston Hotel Company selected the bid of Franklin "Jack" Letton as its first manager. A veteran managing a variety of hotels——including Hotel Knickerbocker, the Ritz-Carlton in London, and the Grand Hotel at Mackinac, Michigan——Letton signed a ten-year management contract to operate the Galvez Hotel. Letton recruited experienced hotel professionals as head waiters and managers, while offering housing at a staff quarters located blocks away from the hotel.

The Galvez Hotel staged its grand opening for June 12, 1911. The hotel owners collaborated with the Galveston Chamber of Commerce to promote the event. A basic single room without a bathroom was available for $2 per night or $12 per week, or with a bathroom for $2.50 per night or $16 per week.

Since the 1950s, the hotel reportedly has ghost sighting especially at room 501.

==== Moody ownership ====
On October 3, 1940, the Hotel Galvez was acquired by William Lewis Moody, Jr. During World War II, the hotel was occupied by the United States Coast Guard for two years and rooms were not rented to tourists. The Hotel Galvez's importance to the local economy was restored after the war, particularly during the late 1940s and early 1950s when illegal gambling was popular in Galveston. When the Texas Rangers shut down the illegal gambling industry in the mid-1950s, the local economy became depressed and the Hotel Galvez deteriorated.

The hotel received a major refurbishing in 1965. In 1971, the hotel was acquired by Harvey O. McCarthey and Dr. Leon Bromberg. Denton Cooley purchased the hotel in 1978 and initiated another major renovation to the hotel in 1979. The Galvez became a Marriott franchise in 1989 and was renamed Marriott's Hotel Galvez. The hotel was purchased in April 1995 by Galveston native and real estate developer George P. Mitchell. Mitchell restored the hotel to its historic 1911 look. Mitchell Historic Properties, brought Wyndham Hotels & Resorts on to manage the hotel in 1996, as under the name Hotel Galvez, a Wyndham Historic Hotel. The name was later changed slightly to Hotel Galvez, a Wyndham Grand Hotel

During Hurricane Ike in 2008, the hotel lost clay tiles from its roof and was flooded on its lower level, where the spa, health club, business offices, and laundry were located.

==== Wyant ownership ====
In May 2021, the hotel was purchased by Mark and Lorenda Wyant, through their Dallas-based Seawall Hospitality LLC. It was renamed Grand Galvez Resort & Spa and management was transferred from Wyndham to Marriott's Autograph Collection division. The Wyants completely renovated the hotel, restoring numerous original features, including the original pink exterior paint scheme. The bold, colorful interiors were inspired by the iconic interiors of The Greenbrier and The Beverly Hills Hotel. The renovations were completed in 2023.

== Gallery ==
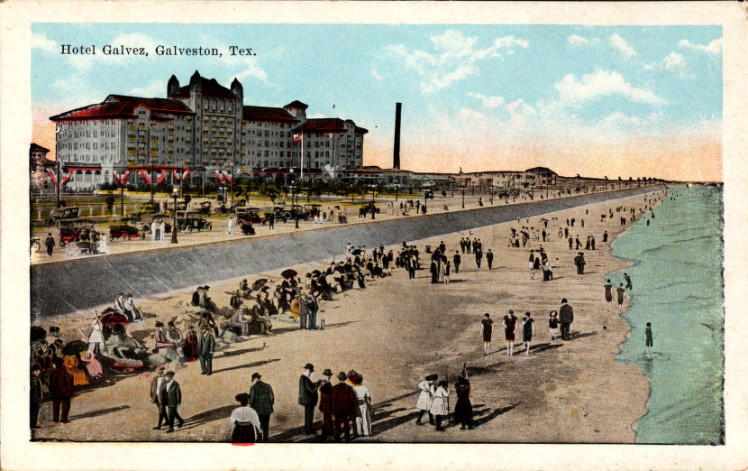
Hotel Galvez, Galveston, Texas (postcard, circa 1911-1924)

Hotel Galvez in Galveston, Texas with streetcar circa 1910s

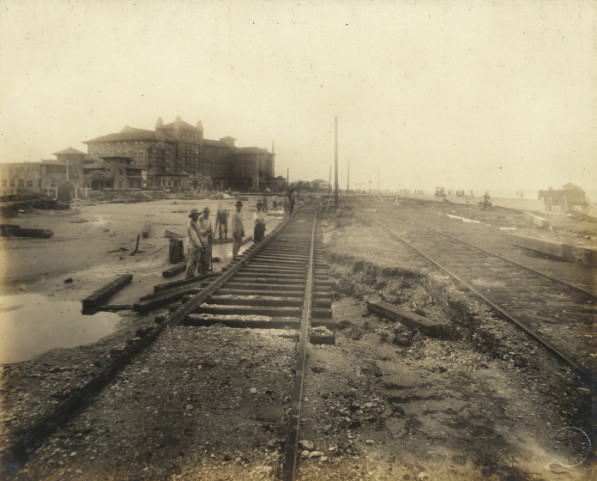
Galveston Electric Co. tracks adjacent to Hotel Galvez (in background) after the 1915 Galveston Hurricane

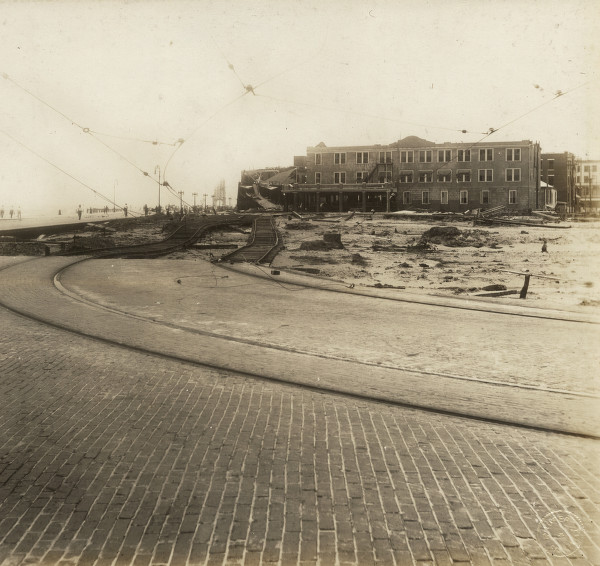
Galveston Electric Co. tracks through City Park adjacent to Hotel Galvez after the 1915 Galveston Hurricane

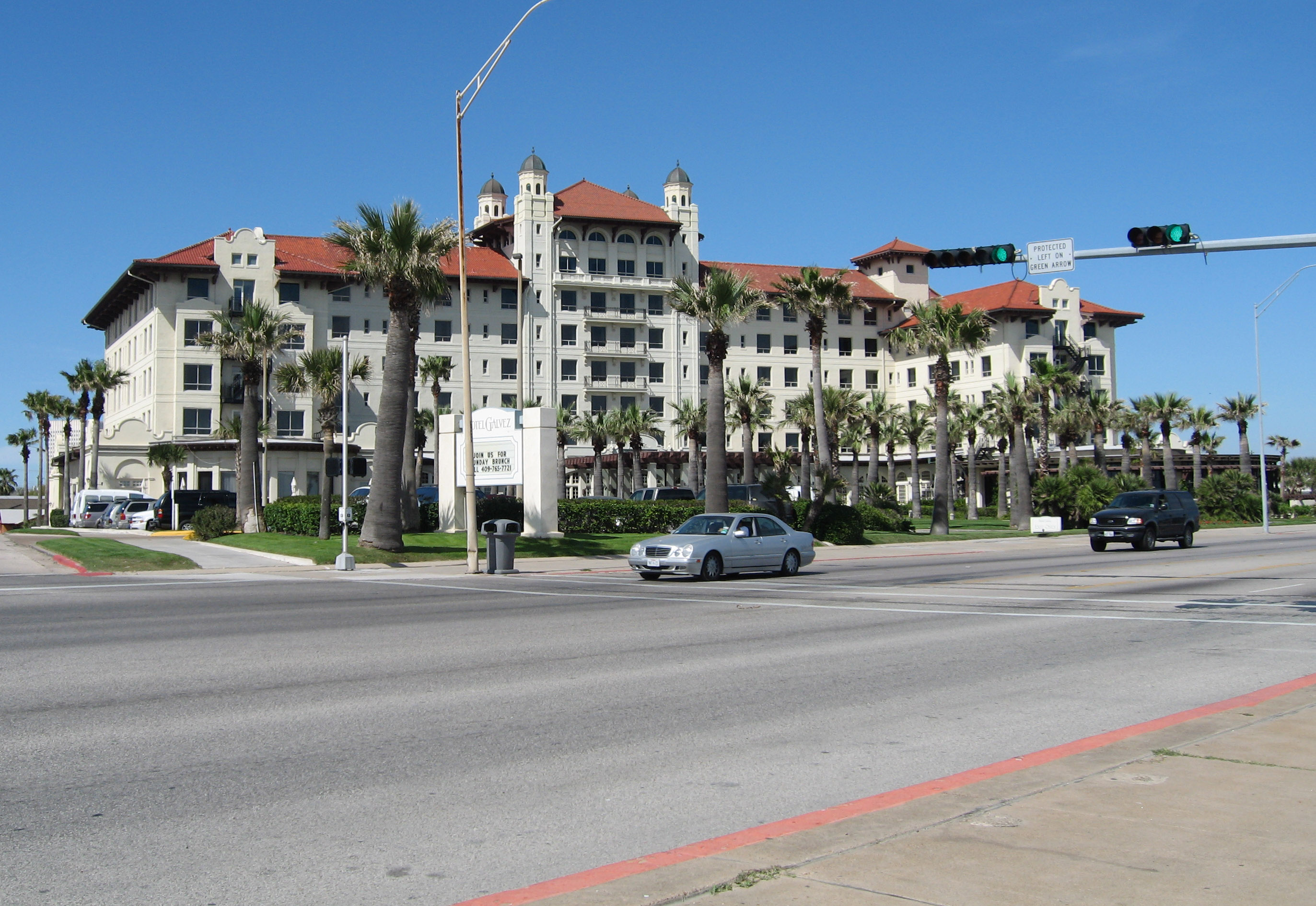
Hotel Galvez in 2006

== See also ==
- National Register of Historic Places listings in Galveston County, Texas
- Recorded Texas Historic Landmarks in Galveston County
- USS Flagship Hotel

== Bibliography ==
- Barnstone, Howard (1993). The Galveston that Was (Annotated reprint ed.). Houston: Museum of Fine Arts of Houston with Rice University Press. ISBN 978-0-89096-887-1.
- Beasley, Ellen; Fox, Stephen (1996). Galveston Architectural Guidebook. Houston: Rice University Press. ISBN 0-89263-345-X.
- Maca, Kathleen (2021). A History of the Hotel Galvez. Charleston, SC: History Press. ISBN 9781625858443.
- McComb, David G. (1986). Galveston: A History. Austin: University of Texas Press. ISBN 978-0-292-72053-4.
