= USS Flagship Hotel =

Hotel in Texas, United States

Flagship Hotel
- Interactive map of the Flagship Hotel area

General information
- Location: Galveston, Texas, USA
- Coordinates: 29°17′13″N 94°47′24″W
- Opening: 1965
- Closed: 2008

Design and construction
- Developer: James E. Lyon

The USS Flagship Hotel was a hotel, located in Galveston in the U.S. state of Texas. The 7-story 225-room hotel was built on the historic Pleasure Pier structure entirely over the Gulf of Mexico. It was a popular destination in Galveston that withstood many storms.

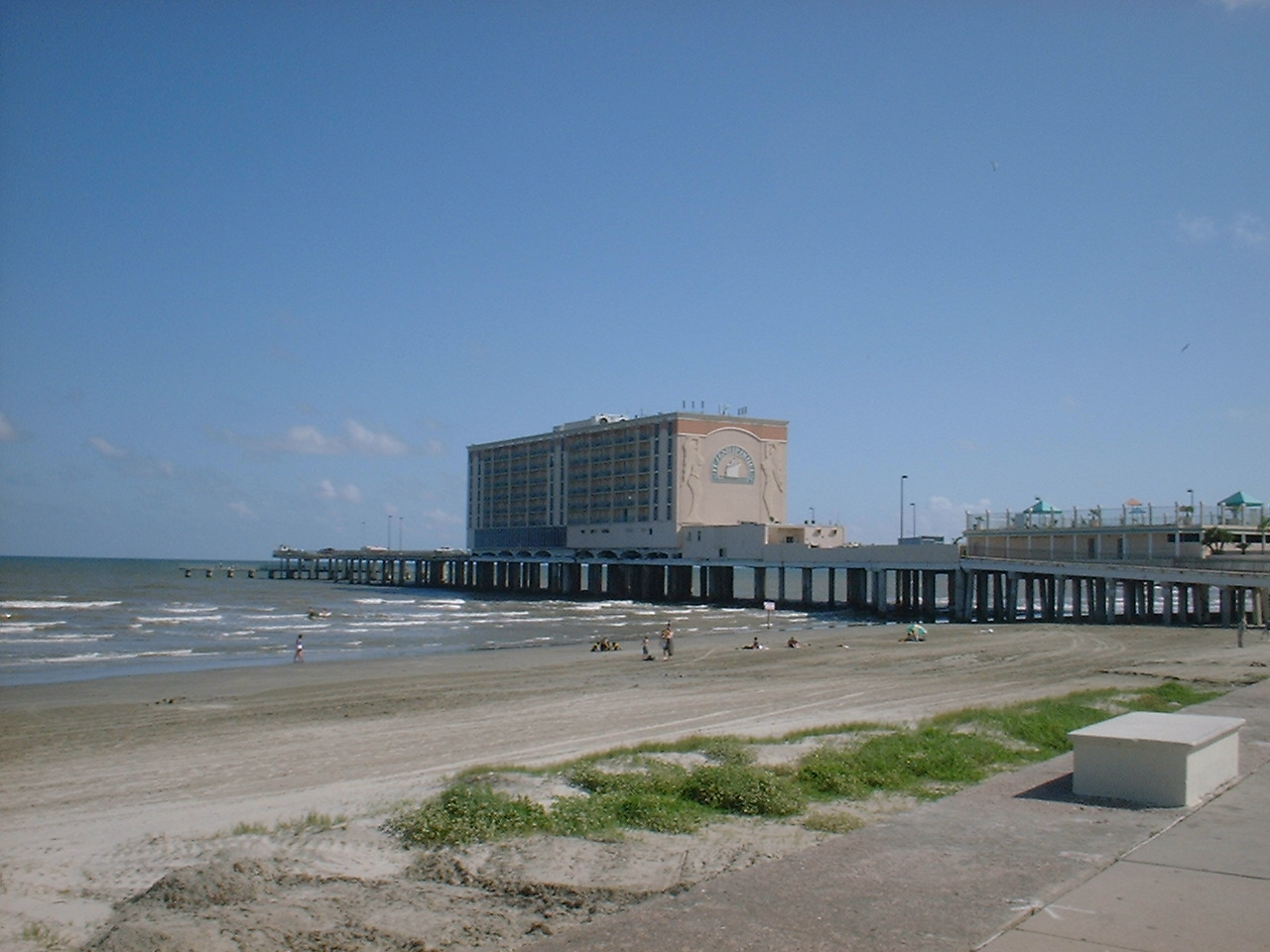
The USS Flagship Hotel in 2004

== History ==
The hotel was built in 1965 by Houston banker James E. Lyon who leased the pier for the construction. The lease rate was US$185,000 annually (US$1.89 million in today's terms) for forty years.

The structure was severely damaged in 2008 by Hurricane Ike, causing its closure.

In 2009, the owner, Landry's, Inc., which acquired the hotel from the Galveston Council in 2003 for $500,000, advised the Galveston city planning commission it would demolish the hotel and build an international amusement park on the pier. Demolition of the hotel took place in February 2011. Work then began on the new Galveston Island Historic Pleasure Pier, which opened in May 2012.

== See also ==
- Hotel Galvez
