= Charles Lyons =

Charles Lyons may refer to:

- Charles R. Lyons (1933–1999), professor of drama and comparative literature at Stanford University
- Charles W. Lyons (1868–1939), Jesuit and president of several Catholic universities

== See also ==
- Charlie Lyons, producer and financier
- Charlie Lyons (footballer) (born 2000), Irish footballer
- Charles Lyon (disambiguation)
