= Colby School District =

School district in Wisconsin, U.S.

Address
- 505 W Spence Street Colby, Clark County, Wisconsin, 54421; United States

District information
- Motto: Learning for All
- Grades: Pre-school - 12
- Superintendent: Patrick Galligan
- NCES District ID: 5502730

Students and staff
- Enrollment: 987
- Student–teacher ratio: 16.70

Other information
- Telephone: (715) 223-2301
- High School: (715) 223-2338
- Website: www.colby.k12.wi.us

The Colby School District is a public school district located in Clark and Marathon in the U.S. state of Wisconsin, and based in Colby, Wisconsin. The district operates an elementary school, a middle school, and a high school, all within the city limits of Colby.

== Schools ==
The Colby School District includes one preschool, one elementary school, one middle school, and one high school.

=== Preschools ===
- Little Stars Preschool

=== Elementary schools ===
- Colby Elementary School
  - Principal: Patrick Galligan (Superintendent)
  - Co-Principal: Brenda Medenwaldt

=== Middle schools ===
- Colby Middle School
  - Principal: Jim Hagen

=== High school ===
- Colby High School
  - Principal: Marcia Diedrich
