= General Lyons =

General Lyons may refer to:

- David B. Lyons (fl. 1990s–2020s), U.S. Air Force major general
- Henry Lyons, 1st Baron Ennisdale (1877–1963), British Army major general
- Humphrey Lyons (1802–1873), British Indian Army lieutenant general
- Judd H. Lyons (born 1962), U.S. Army National Guard major general
- Stephen R. Lyons (fl. 1990s–2020s), U.S. Army four-star general
- Thomas Lyons (British Army officer) (1829–1897), British Army general

== See also ==
- General Lyon (disambiguation)
