= David Lyons =

David Lyons may refer to:

- David Lyons (actor) (born 1976), Australian actor
- David Lyons (rugby union, born 1980), Australian rugby union player
- David Lyons (rugby union, born 1985), English rugby union player
- David Lyons (philosopher) (born 1935), professor of philosophy and law at Boston University
- David Lyons (swimmer) (born 1943), American swimmer

== See also ==
- David Lyon (disambiguation)
- Lyons (surname)
