= General Lyon =

General Lyon may refer to:

== People ==
- Edwin Bowman Lyon (1892–1971), U.S. Air Force major general
- Hylan B. Lyon (1836–1907), Confederate States Army brigadier general
- James Frederick Lyon (1775–1842), British Army lieutenant general
- LeRoy Springs Lyon (1866–1920), U.S. Army major general
- Nathaniel Lyon (1818–1861), Union Army brigadier general
- Robert Lyon (British Army officer) (1923–2019), British Army major general
- William Lyon (general) (1923–2020), U.S. Air Force major general

== Ships ==
- American steamship General Lyon (1864), steamship used as a transport in the American Civil War
- USS General Lyon (1860), steamboat that saw active service in the American Civil War

== See also ==
- General Lyons (disambiguation)
