= David Lyon =

David Lyon may refer to:

- Dave Lyon (footballer, born 1948) (1948–2019), English football forward
- Dave Lyon (footballer, born 1951) (1951–1999), English football defender
- Dave Lyon (track coach) (1938–2013), Canadian track and field coach
- David Lyon (actor) (1941–2013), British actor
- David Lyon (cricketer) (born 1943), English cricketer
- David Lyon (designer) (born 1968), car designer
- David Lyon (rugby) (born 1965), English rugby league and rugby union player
- David Lyon (sociologist) (born 1948), professor of sociology at Queen's University, Kingston, Ontario
- David Lyon (British politician) (1794–1872), West India merchant, Member of Parliament and landowner
- David Gordon Lyon (1852–1922), American theologian
- David Murray Lyon (1888–1956), British physician and medical author
- David Bowes-Lyon (1902–1961), brother of Elizabeth Bowes-Lyon, the Queen Mother
- David Murray-Lyon (1890–1975), officer in the Indian Army
- David Lyon (Nigerian politician) (born 1970), disqualified governor-elect of Bayelsa State

== See also ==
- David Lyons (disambiguation)
