= Kirk Baumgartner =

American football player (born 1967)

Profile
- Position: Quarterback

Personal information
- Born: November 3, 1967 (age 59); Colby, Wisconsin, U.S.

Career information
- College: UW–Stevens Point (1986–1989)
- NFL draft: 1990: 9th round, 242nd overall pick
- College Football Hall of Fame

Kirk Baumgartner (born November 3, 1967) is an American football player. He is the fourth son to James and Patricia Baumgartner. He joined brothers Brian, Brad, and Kevin. Another son, Keith, was born later. Baumgartner attended Colby High School and went on to attend University of Wisconsin–Stevens Point.

== Football career ==
At UW–Stevens Point, Baumgartner was a three-time First Team NAIA All-American, and arguably the best quarterback in National Association of Intercollegiate Athletics history. He is currently the leader in passing yards, with 14,847 yards in his career. Baumgartner also was a two-time NAIA National Player of the Year. He participated in the Senior Bowl before being drafted. In 1987, Baumgartner led UW-Stevens Point to a NAIA National Championship, but the season was forfeited later due to use of an ineligible athlete.

He still holds many records in the Wisconsin Intercollegiate Athletic Conference (WIAC). He currently leads all of these categories:

Passes Attempted: 1,949
Passes Completed: 997
Passing Yards: 14,847
Passing Touchdowns: 122
Total Offensive Attempts: 2,320
Total Offensive Yards: 14,553

He was also a three-time first-team All-WIAC selection and was twice named WIAC Player of the Year. Baumgartner was drafted in the ninth round of the 1990 NFL draft by the Green Bay Packers.

== Honors ==
He was inducted into the UW-Stevens Point Hall of Fame in 2001. Baumgartner was inducted into to the College Football Hall of Fame in 2005.
