= Maryland Higher Education Commission =

State of Maryland's governing board for higher education

The Maryland Higher Education Commission is the State of Maryland's governing board for higher education. It is responsible for establishing state policies for public and private colleges and universities and for-profit career schools. It is an independent agency created in 1988 and given responsibility for the planning, supervision and coordination of Maryland’s postsecondary education system under Education Article, §§10-207, 11-105.
