= James E. Lyons (academic) =

American academic administrator (born 1943)

James E. Lyons Sr.
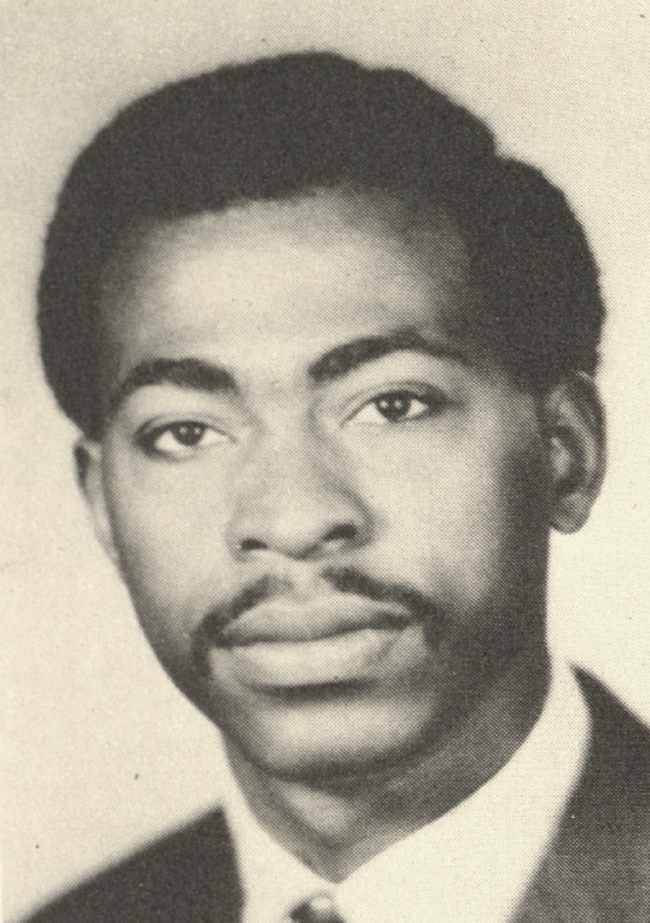
- Lyons in 1976

Interim President of Concordia College Alabama
- In office 2017–2017

Interim President of University of the District of Columbia
- In office March 2013 – June 2016

Interim President of Dillard University
- In office 2010–2013

Secretary of the Maryland Higher Education Commission
- In office 2007–2010

President of California State University, Dominguez Hills
- In office 1999–2007

President of Jackson State University
- In office 1992–1999

President of Bowie State University
- In office 1983–1992

Personal details
- Born: 1943 (age 82–83) New Haven, Connecticut, US
- Education: University of Connecticut
- Occupation: Academic administrator

James E. Lyons, Sr. (born c. 1943) is an American academic administrator who has served as president of several historically black colleges and universities. He is a former president of Bowie State University, Jackson State University, and California State University, Dominguez Hills. Lyons was interim president of Dillard University, University of the District of Columbia, and Concordia College Alabama. He was a secretary of the Maryland Higher Education Commission.

== Early life and education ==
Lyons was born c. 1943 and raised in a housing project in New Haven, Connecticut. He completed all of his degrees at University of Connecticut, including a B.A. in Spanish in 1965, M.A. in student personnel in 1971, and a Ph.D. in higher education in 1973. He conducted postdoctoral research at the Harvard Graduate School of Education's Institute for Educational Management.

== Career ==
Lyons was a tutor counselor at Rodman Job Corps in New Bedford, Massachusetts. In the late 1960s, he served in the Peace Corps in Ecuador. He was director of the Conscience Educational Day Camp at Temple University from 1967 to 1969. At University of Connecticut, he was assistant dean of students and director of the Afro-American Cultural Center, and Black student advisor. From 1973 to 1974, Lyons was an administrative assistant to the vice president for academic affairs, director of institutional research, and associate professor of education at Kentucky State University. He was the assistant to the vice chancellor for academic affairs and director of summer school at Fayetteville State University from 1974 to 1975. From 1975 to 1978, Lyons was vice president for academic affairs and professor of education at Barber–Scotia College. From 1978 to 1983, he served as vice president and dean of academic affairs, chief negotiator, and professor of education at Delaware State University.

From 1983 to 1992, Lyons served as president of Bowie State University. While at Bowie State, Lyons increased the operating budget from $12 million to over $30 million in 8 years, raised admission standards, ended the decline in enrollment by 77% and raised the institution to university status. He became the 8th president of Jackson State University on July 1, 1992, where he remained until 1999. From 1999 to 2007, Lyons served as president of California State University, Dominguez Hills, where he expanded academic programs and was involved with the installation of the $150 million Home Depot sports complex. From 2007 to 2010, he was secretary of the Maryland Higher Education Commission. From 2010 to 2013, he was interim president of Dillard University. On March 20, 2013, Lyons became interim president of University of the District of Columbia. In 2017, Lyons became chief transition officer of Concordia College Alabama appointed to serve as interim president for 6 months.

== Personal life ==
Lyons has 3 sons.
