= Arthur Lyon & Co =

Arthur Lyon & Co Ltd
- Industry: Engineering
- Founded: 1912
- Defunct: 1965
- Successor: Newage Lyon Ltd
- Headquarters: London, England
- Key people: Arthur Lyon
- Products: Pumps, Generators

Arthur Lyon & Co Ltd. was a company based in London, England founded by Arthur Anderson Lyon M.I.Mech.E. (1876–1962).

Arthur Anderson Lyon was an engineer and inventor who appears in the patent records in 1911 with a portable signalling device, but by mid-1916 his inventions move from signalling lamps to electric generators and batteries. He had created his own company, Arthur Lyon & Co, Caxton House, Westminster c. 1912, but in February 1915 he merged this with the Wrench Manufacturing Company of Crawford Passage, Farrindon Road, London to form Arthur Lyon & Wrench Limited. The merged company was based in Victoria Road, Acton, London, but was in voluntary liquidation by December 1920. Arthur Lyon & Co was re-formed directly to continue the manufacture of engine-powered generators and pumps, with a particular emphasis on light weight and portability.

Production continued through World War II with military generators being the main product. In 1948 the company was acquired by Newage Engineers, and in 1950 they transferred Arthur Lyon & Co generator business to Barnack Road, Stamford, Peterborough. In 1965 Arthur Lyon & Co and Newage (Manchester) Ltd consolidated to form Newage Lyon Ltd, and production continues in Stamford now as Cummins Generator Technologies.

== Arthur Lyon & Co products (before 1915) ==
Products were exhibited by Arthur Lyon & Co Ltd at the Olympia exhibition devoted to flying in March 1914, as follows:

- Daylight signalling lamp which is used for signalling from aircraft and for use at night in landing airships.
- Steven's-Lyon self-contained and portable signal lamp that weighs only 6.5 lbs.
- Various forms of oxy-petrol and electric arc searchlight together with an L.F. dynamo lighting equipment

== Arthur Lyon & Wrench Co products (1915–1920) ==
When the companies were merged they stated their intention to continue the production of :

- Cinema Requisities
- Lamps
- Light projecting apparatus
- Dynamos
- Signalling apparatus
- Searchlights
- Arc-projectors
- Oxy-hydrogen and oxy-petrol lighting sets for motor cars, motor lorries, etc.

At the end of World War I the Ministry of Munitions sold-off some new equipment the Royal Engineers had in stock which included 6 of "4kW Petrol Electric Generating Sets, by Lyon and Winch, consisting of Two Cycle 'Coventry Simplex' engines, direct coupled to compound wound D.C. dynamos." Coventry-Simplex was the company that became Coventry Climax in 1917, and apparently during World War I they provided hundreds of engines to power searchlights. As Coventry-Simplex only made four stroke engines of 2, 4 and 6 cylinders, it is to be assumed that the "Two Cycle" referred to should say "Two Cylinder". likewise "Lyon and Winch" should read "Lyon and Wrench".

For the civilian market, launched at the Royal Show in Cardiff in June 1919, they advertised the Lyon-Brotherhood electric lighting plant (manufactured under Lyon and Ricardo patents). Peter Brotherhood Ltd were manufacturers of engines including quite large lighting plant at this time. The article on the same page covering the show describes the lighting plant as being able to supply power for 50 to 250 lamps, but the article concludes with an unusual statement unrelated to domestic power supply that states "Thousands of the Lyon portable A.B.C. plants have been supplied to the Admiralty and the anti-aircraft department."

Given Arthur Lyon & Wrench went into voluntary liquidation in 1920. It is possible few if any of the Lyon-Brotherhood plant were sold, as they do not appear used for sale in the papers, though other Lyon & Wrench lighting plant does.

== Arthur Lyon & Co products (after 1920) ==
=== Bungalyte Generator ===
Advertised as the small electric lighting set for the small house, this used the Norman Engineering Co "D" type petrol engine, which was a compact 143cc overhead valve 4-stroke built between 1920 and 1926.

=== Pre-war Norman-Lyon lighting sets ===
These may have used the Norman successor to the D type engine (the S type or SC type), but after 1932 a Norman flat-twin of 300cc was available and this was used in the WW2 sets, so probably used in pre-war generator sets.

=== WW2 ALCO charging and pumping sets ===
Using an ALCO Featherweight four stroke overhead valve petrol engine of 129cc (51mm bore, 62.5mm stroke) which developed 1.25bhp at 3000rpm. This is an engine made by J.A. Prestwich, with the difference being that ALCO Featherweight is cast into the timing cover. More powerful charging sets were made using the Norman T300 twin cylinder petrol engine, which was 300cc and rated at 2.75bhp. Both engines were air cooled by fan or impeller.

WW2 ALCO "Firefly" steam powered battery charger. This unusual generator was designed for parachute drop in a standard parachute container, and included an oil-fired steam generator, which provided steam for a Stuart Turner Sirius twin cylinder steam engine, which drove a standard wireless service generator for charging 6 volt batteries. Several of these rare generators survive, and suggest that it was made for many years from 1943 with the MkIV version having a single cylinder steam engine. These sets were supposedly used by special operatives.

WW2 "Lyon Lights" may well have been a further product of this company. They were beach defence lights of 20 to 24 inch diameter complete with a petrol engine and electric generator. In the event of invasion from the sea they were to be turned on to allow pillboxes a clear view of the enemy. The connection has yet to be proven.

=== Immediate post-war period ===
ALCO lighting and pumping sets are advertised. The lighting sets are twin-cylinder petrol, 24 volt 1260 watt. The pumping sets are driven by a 1.25 HP J.A.P. engine and can pump 1600 gallons per hour.

=== From about 1949 ===
Diesel, petrol and petrol/paraffin driven lighting and battery charging sets, including the "Alcomatic". The diesel plant was 230 V, 5/6 kVA, and used a Petter engine.

Arthur Lyon & Co maker's plates are also to be found on much larger generators from this period, and the Internal Fire – Museum of Power has a 27 kVA generator powered by a Perkins P6 engine dating to 1954 with the 'Stamford' generator badged "Arthur Lyons & Co (Engineers) Ltd". Another smaller generator from this period that has come to light is ex-military, and is rated as 240 V 5 kVA. It is powered by a Villiers Mark 12H stationary petrol engine.
