= Rudy Juedeman =

American politician

Rudolph Frederick "Rudy" Juedeman

Montana State Representative from Toole County
- In office 1953–1959

Personal details
- Born: May 11, 1908 Creek County, Oklahoma, USA
- Died: January 20, 2004 (aged 95) Odessa, Ector County, Texas
- Resting place: Sunset Memorial Gardens in Odessa, Texas
- Party: Republican
- Spouse: Ithai M. Juedeman
- Children: Lynne J. Baldwin
- Occupation: Farmer; businessman

Rudolph Frederick Juedeman, known as Rudy Juedeman (May 11, 1908 – January 20, 2004), was a farmer, businessman, and Republican politician in the U.S. states of Montana and Texas.

== Background ==
Juedeman was born in the community of Slick in Creek County in east central Oklahoma. From 1953 to 1959, while a wheat farmer in Toole County on the Canada–US border, he served three terms in the Montana House of Representatives, including a stint as the House Majority Leader. He was also the Montana state Republican Party chairman.

== Political life ==
In 1958, he moved to Odessa in Ector County in West Texas to enter the oil and natural gas business with his brother-in-law, Morris Ford "Jake" Lawless (1903–1986). Within the next several years, Juedeman exerted a behind-the-scenes role in the development of the Permian Basin division of the Texas Republican Party and did not always receive proper recognition for his role as the original "Mr. Republican" of Ector County. In Juedeman's obituary in the Odessa American, the paragraph on politics describes him as a

mainstay of the Texas Republican Party, one instrumental in building an effective party apparatus in Ector County during the early 1960s, an era when state and local politics [was] dominated by the Democratic Party. Relying on his experience ... in Montana politics, Juedeman mentored young Republican candidates running for office, advised the party faithful on the creation of an effective vote-getting organization, and campaigned tirelessly for Texas Republican issues and candidates for over three decades. Characterized by a positive attitude and an ever-present sense of humor, he zestfully entered the political fray. Victories were received with cheerful grace, and losses ... without bitterness or rancor.

In 1962, Juedeman was credited with exerting a major role in the election of Ed Foreman to Texas's 16th congressional district, the lines of which then stretched from El Paso to the Permian Basin. Foreman later served in the U.S. House from New Mexico as well, but his tenure was limited to one term from each state.<

== Legacy ==
In Odessa Juedeman became active in many civic causes, including the Chamber of Commerce and the boards of both Odessa College and the University of Texas of the Permian Basin.

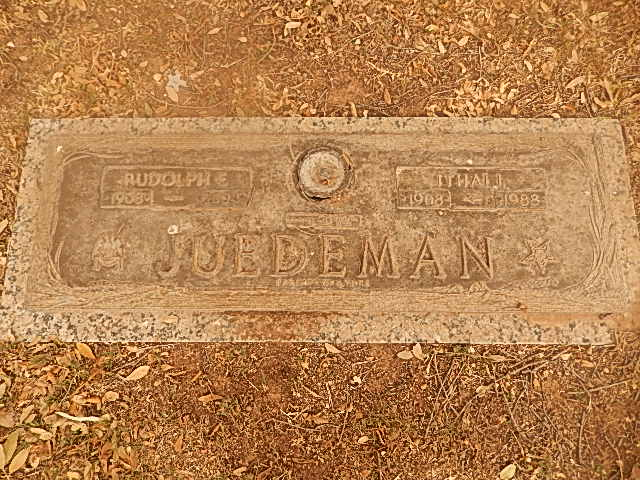
Juedeman grave at Sunset Memorial Gardens in Odessa, Texas

Juedeman died at the age of ninety-five in the Odessa Medical Center, of which he was also a board member. He was active in the large First Baptist Church of Odessa. He was predeceased by his wife, Ithai M. Juedeman (1908–1988). The couple is interred in Lot 146 of the Serenity North section at Sunset Memorial Gardens in Odessa. His survivors included a daughter, Dr. Lynne J. Baldwin (born 1946) of Omaha, Nebraska, and a brother, Ralph E. Juedeman (1917–2010) of Bristow, Oklahoma.

On Juedeman's death, Jim Reese, the mayor of Odessa from 1968 to 1974 and two-time candidate for Texas's 19th congressional district seat, told the Odessa American: "He was active in Republican Party activities out here when you could fit us all in a phone booth. ... He was a very, very energetic guy ... a likeable fellow. His sense of humor was one thing I remember about him. Regardless how things went in a campaign – win or lose – he always had that sense of humor." Juedeman had even tried to draft Reese into seeking the 1972 Republican gubernatorial nomination, but the selection instead went to then State Senator Henry Grover of Houston, who was defeated in a heavily contested election by the Democrat Dolph Briscoe of Uvalde.

Texas State Representative George E. "Buddy" West of Odessa, who worked to procure the Presidential Museum and Leadership Library on the UTPB campus, said that Juedeman was his mentor too: "He's always been to me 'Mr. Republican' in Ector County. He was a Republican when Republican wasn't cool."

In 1998, Juedeman received the "Community Statesman Award" for government from the Heritage of Odessa Foundation.
