= Senator Lyon (disambiguation) =

Lucius Lyon (1800–1851), U.S. Senator from Michigan from 1837 to 1839. Senator Lyon may also refer to:

- Bob Lyon (born 1955), Kansas State Senate
- Caleb Lyon (1822–1875), New York State Senate
- Charles W. Lyon (1887–1960), California State Senate
- Chittenden Lyon (1787–1842), Kentucky State Senate
- Francis S. Lyon (1800–1882), Alabama State Senate
- Walter Lyon (politician) (1853–1933), Pennsylvania State Senate

== See also ==
- Senator Lynn (disambiguation)
- Senator Lyons (disambiguation)
