= USS General Lyon =

Cargo ship of the United States Navy

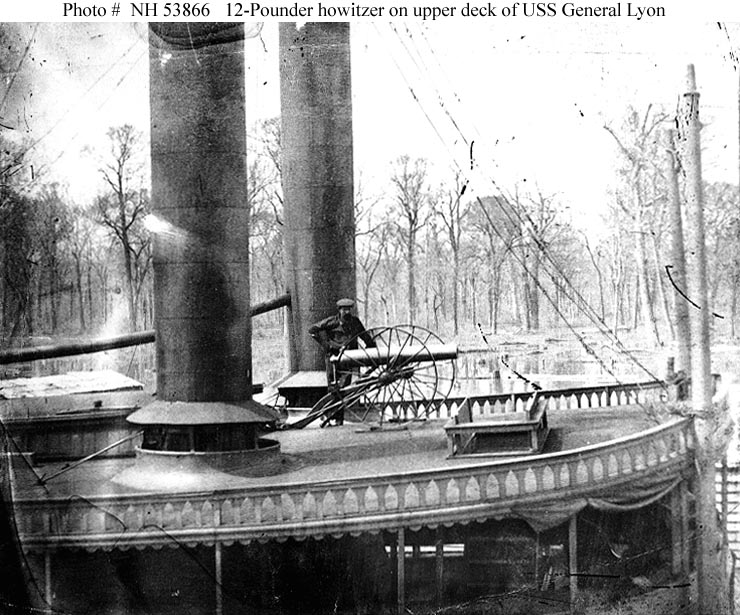
- USS General Lyon (1862-1865) View of the ship's upper deck, forward, during the Civil War, showing her smokestacks and a 12-pounder Dahlgren howitzer on an iron field carriage. Note low wooden railing around the deck edge.

History

United States
- Name: USS General Lyon
- Laid down: date unknown
- Launched: 1860
- Commissioned: 24 October 1862
- Decommissioned: 3 August 1865
- Stricken: 1865 (est.)
- Captured: by Union Navy forces; 30 September 1862
- Fate: Sold, 17 August 1865

General characteristics
- Displacement: 468 tons
- Length: 180 ft (55 m)
- Beam: 35 ft (11 m)
- Draft: 7 ft (2.1 m)
- Propulsion: steam engine; side wheel-propelled
- Speed: not known
- Complement: not known
- Armament: two 12-pounder rifled guns

USS General Lyon, originally the De Soto, was recaptured from the Confederate States of America and renamed USS De Soto, and then USS General Lyon, after Brigadier General Nathaniel Lyon.

The steamer was put into service by the Union Navy as a storeship and dispatch boat serving the Union ships on the blockade of the Confederacy.

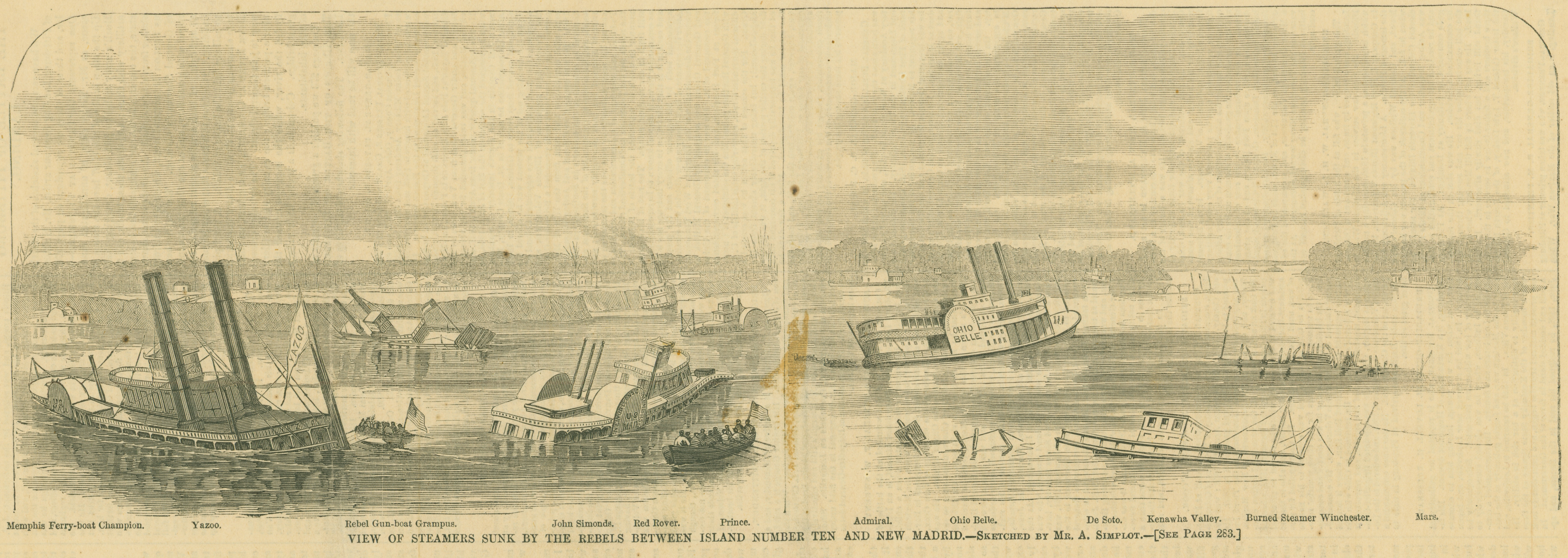
Confederate ships sinking off Island Number Ten and New Madrid, the USS General Lyon is listed as the Confederate ship CSS De Soto.

== Service history ==
The ship was a sidewheel paddle steamer built at New Albany, Indiana, in 1860, and operated out of New Orleans, Louisiana, as De Soto. She was one of the many ships taken over by Confederate forces for use on the Mississippi River and other rivers during the American Civil War (1861–1865).

In April 1862 De Soto was busy ferrying troops to evacuate the area near Island Number 10 on the Mississippi River and was used, under a flag of truce, to communicate with Union gunboats. On 7 April 1862 she carried Confederate officers who surrendered possession of Island Number 10 to Flag Officer Andrew Hull Foote. It was at night, and De Soto approached cautiously, giving four blasts of her whistle, repeatedly, until answered, whereupon Federal officers came on board to accept the surrender.

The ship was taken into Union Army service as the transport De Soto. Transferred to the United States Navy on 30 September 1862 as USS De Soto, she was renamed USS General Lyon on 24 October 1862 with Master John R. Neeld in command.

After undergoing extensive repairs at Cairo, Illinois, General Lyon saw duty as ordnance, stores, and dispatch ship for the U.S. Navy's Mississippi Squadron. Leaving Cairo on 2 February 1863, she operated for the next two and a half years on the western waters. In April 1863 she was briefly the flagship of Rear Admiral David Dixon Porter.

After the end of the Civil War, General Lyon arrived at Mound City, Illinois, on 17 February 1865, decommissioned on 3 August 1865, and was sold to H. L. Lee 17 August 1865. She was re-documented for commercial service as Alabama, and was destroyed by fire at Grand View, Louisiana, on 1 April 1867.
