= Dave Lyon (footballer, born 1948) =

English footballer (1948–2019)

Personal information
- Full name: David Edward Lyon
- Date of birth: 21 November 1948
- Place of birth: Oldham, England
- Date of death: 19 December 2019 (aged 71)
- Place of death: Oldham
- Positions: Forward; winger

Youth career
- 19??–1967: Bolton Wanderers

Senior career*
Years	Team	Apps	(Gls)
1966–1967	Bolton Wanderers	0	(0)
1967	Bury	0	(0)
1967–1968	Mossley		(10)
1968–1973	Macclesfield Town	166	(30)
1973–1974	Wigan Athletic		
1974–197?	Altrincham		
197?–1975	Poole Town		
1975	→ Macclesfield Town (loan)	10	(1)
1975–1976	Mossley		(3)
1976–1977	Southport	13	(1)
1977–197?	Runcorn		
- Ashton United
1979	Macclesfield Town	3	(0)
- * Club domestic league appearances and goals

David Edward Lyon (21 November 1948 – 19 December 2019) was an English footballer who played in the Football League for Southport. He played as a forward or winger.

== Life and career ==
Born in Oldham, Lyon began his football career as an apprentice with Bolton Wanderers, and was briefly on the books of Bury, but never played league football for either. He spent just over a season with Mossley, during which he attracted the attention of league clubs, before signing for Macclesfield Town, founder members of the new Northern Premier League.

He contributed 10 goals from 57 appearances as Macclesfield won consecutive league titles, and scored the opening goal of a 2–0 win against Telford United in the inaugural FA Trophy Final at Wembley. He was the club's top scorer in his fifth season with Macclesfield, and then spent time with Wigan Athletic, Altrincham, Poole Town, and second spells at Macclesfield and Mossley before signing for Southport of the Football League Fourth Division in 1976.

Lyon made his Football League debut at the age of 27, on 25 September 1976 in a 1–0 defeat at home to Newport County. He kept his place in the starting eleven for eight matches, and gave his team a first league win of the season with the only goal of the match at home to Barnsley on 22 October. After two appearances from the bench, Lyon did not appear again until March, when he made three starts and his final appearance from the bench.

He also played non-league football for Runcorn and Ashton United before returning to Macclesfield for a final spell in 1979.

Outside football, Lyon was a woodworker and in later years worked in the family dry-cleaning business. He also coached at local youth level.

Lyon died in December 2019 at the age of 71.
