= James Lyon =

James Lyon may refer to:

- James E. Lyon (1927–1993), American businessman and Texas Republican politician
- James Lyon, 7th Earl of Strathmore and Kinghorne (c. 1702–1735)
- James Lyon (composer) (1735–1794), early American music composer
- Sir James Frederick Lyon (1775–1842), British Army officer and Governor of Barbados, 1829–33
- James R. Lyon (1833–?), American merchant and soldier, Wisconsin Republican politician
- James M. Lyon, American computer programmer, co-author of the INTERCAL programming language

== See also ==
- James Lyons (disambiguation)
- Jimmy Lyon (disambiguation)
