= Charles Lyon =

Charles Lyon may refer to:

- Charles Lyon (British Army officer) (1878–1959), English soldier and cricketer
- Charles Lyon, 6th Earl of Strathmore and Kinghorne (c.1699–1728), Scottish peer
- Charles W. Lyon (1887–1960), American attorney
- Charles Lyon (sailor) (1915–1987), American sailor

== See also ==
- Charles Lyons (disambiguation)
- Lyon (disambiguation)
