= Alexander Lyon =

Alexander or Alex Lyon may refer to:

- Alexander Lyon, 2nd Lord Glamis (c. 1430–1486), Scottish nobleman
- Alex Lyon (politician) (1931–1993), British politician
- Alex Lyon (ice hockey) (born 1992), American ice hockey goaltender

== See also ==
- Alexander Lyons (1867–1939), American rabbi
- Alexander Lion (1870–1962), co-founder of the German Scout movement
