= James E. Lyon =

American banker, real estate developer, politician (1927–1993)

James Edwin "Jimmy" Lyon, Jr.
- Born: August 25, 1927; Houston, Texas, US
- Died: May 1, 1993 (aged 65); Houston, Texas, US
- Resting place: Memorial Oaks Cemetery in Houston
- Education: Rice University; University of Houston
- Occupations: Real estate developer; Banker
- Political party: Republican
- Spouses: Unknown first wife; Desiree Lyon (married 1990)
- Children: 3

James Edwin Lyon, Jr., known as Jimmy Lyon (August 25, 1927 – May 1, 1993), was an American banker, real estate developer, and Republican politician from Houston, Texas. Member of the Council for National Policy (not the Center for National Policy).

== Business background ==
A graduate of the former San Jacinto High School in Houston, Lyon served in the United States Marine Corps and attended Rice University and the University of Houston. In 1962, the Junior Chamber International in Houston named him one of five "Outstanding Young Texans."

Lyon excelled in business as the chairman of the board of Ruska Instrument Corporation, a calibration company, and the 13-floor former River Oaks Bank and Trust Company, located and named for the affluent River Oaks neighborhood of Houston. In 1991, Compass Bancshares purchased River Oaks Bank. Lyon's real estate company had also constructed the River Oaks Bank building. Lyon was a former board member of the Federal National Mortgage Association, known as Fannie Mae.

In his real estate career, Lyon developed numerous area subdivisions, including Briarmeadow, Spring Branch, Farnham Park, Tanglewilde, and Briarbend. In 1965, he built the 7-story, 225-room USS Flagship Hotel on Pleasure Pier in Galveston. The hotel was destroyed by Hurricane Ike in 2008, and an amusement park subsequently opened at that site. In 1984, Lyon completed The Huntingdon, a 34-story high luxury residential condominium with 120 units located at 2121 Kirby Drive in River Oaks.

== Lyon the Republican ==
Lyon was an early Republican, having worked for Thad Hutcheson, an attorney from Houston, the party's choice in a special election for the U.S. Senate held on April 2, 1957. In this contest, the Democrat Ralph Yarborough won the right to succeed his 1956 gubernatorial opponent, Price Daniel, because Daniel resigned his Senate seat to become governor in January 1957. Hutcheson finished third in the race with 23 percent of the vote; then U.S. Representative Martin Dies, Jr., known for his House investigations into communist infiltration placed second. No runoff election was then required in Texas in such situations. Yarborough won with 38 percent of the vote.

A friend, Welcome W. Wilson, Sr., also a Houston real estate businessman, recalls Lyon's GOP labors, having built the party:

step by step. Very slowly over a long period of time. And Lyon was a businessman unlike any other. He was articulate. He was a visionary. He built the Flagship Hotel out in the Gulf of Mexico. He built office buildings and subdivisions. ... He was my closest friend for twenty-five years before he died of pancreatic cancer. And everybody I know who knew James Lyon has a James Lyon story. [Like the time he fell asleep in a telephone booth at the Houston Club and did not wake up until 5 o'clock the next morning] ...

From 1968 to 1973, Lyon was the director of the finance committee of the Republican Party of Harris County. In 1969, the county GOP designated him as "Mr. Republican."

In 1972, Lyon supported conservative gubernatorial candidate Henry Grover, then a state senator from Houston. Another group of Republicans, led by Rudy Juedeman, an oilman in Odessa, tried without success to draft Jim Reese, then the mayor of Odessa, for the nomination, but Lyon remained committed to support Grover. Thereafter, Hank Grover defeated the Houston businessman Albert Bel Fay in a runoff election for the Republican nomination, but he then lost in the general election to the Democrat Dolph Briscoe of Uvalde.

Lyon was an alternate delegation to the 1972 Republican National Convention. Subsequently, he was a delegate for Ronald W. Reagan at both the 1976 and the 1980 Republican national conventions. He was Reagan's Texas finance chairman in 1976.

After Reagan's inauguration in 1981, Lyon donated $10,000 to the White House redecoration fund, which raised more than $700,000, much of which was spent on the private living quarters.

Lyon was a member of the conservative think tank, the Center for National Policy; other figures in the organization during the 1980s included Paul Weyrich, Nelson Bunker Hunt, Phyllis Schlafly, Pat Robertson, and Howard Phillips.

== Personal life ==
Active in multiple civic and community affairs, Lyon founded the James E. Lyon Medical Research Foundation, which underwrites cancer research. He was a board member of both Rice University Associates and the St. Joseph's Hospital Foundation. He served too on the president's council of Houston Baptist University.

Lyon died at his home in Houston at the age of sixty-five. His second wife of some three years, Desiree; his mother, Virginia Asbell Lyon Hedrick (1904–2000), was a native of Pierre, South Dakota, who was formerly a lecturer for the Dale Carnegie company. His daughters from the first marriage were Dana Lyon, Melissa Lyon Simon, and Jennifer Stewart Lyon (born 1959), all of Houston; he also had a stepdaughter, Lelia Ellane Dodson (born 1968) of San Francisco, California.

Lyon's services were held at the Second Baptist Church in Houston. He is interred Memorial Oaks Cemetery in Houston.
