= James R. Lyons =

American plastic surgeon

James Robert Lyons is an American plastic surgeon, author, former clinical instructor at Yale University, and former national junior ballroom dancing champion.

== Early life and education ==
Lyons was born in New Haven, Connecticut. At the age of 9, he began to study ballroom dancing. On September 27, 1966, as junior amateurs, Lyons and his partner Penny Sousa won the Foxtrot Division and were named All Around Champion at the Harvest Moon Ball held at Madison Square Garden. On October 2, 1966, as winners, Lyons and Penny Sousa appeared on Season 20, episode 4 of The Ed Sullivan Show on CBS.

== Author ==
Based on his clinical experience in plastic surgery, Lyons developed three central impressions: that there are different types of fat in the adult female body, including one he identified as structural brown fat; that the more brown fat a woman has, the leaner she tends to be; and that different types of fat can be moderated by lifestyle, diet, and exercise. In April 2009, the scientific community released information confirming Lyons' impressions that fat could be rejuvenated by exercise and diet. While previously scientists postulated that brown fat only had physiologic relevance in rodents and newborn humans, several research studies, whose results were published in the New England Journal of Medicine' article titled "Identification and Importance of Brown Adipose Tissue in Adult Humans", confirmed that brown fat can be promoted with a healthy lifestyle.

Lyons developed a nutrition and exercise program for women designed to convert yellow fat into brown fat, with a goal of improving health and fitness without losing subcutaneous volume needed to prevent wrinkles, sagging, and other signs of aging. The plan, built on his experience as a bodybuilder and professional dancer, involved an eating cycle that alternates between days focused on proteins and carbohydrates. The exercise program focused on building a strong core to raise the metabolism and create a strong hub of lean muscle.

== Awards and distinctions ==
- In 1987, Lyons received the Yale Plastic Surgery Resident's Award for Excellence in Teaching
- In 2009, Time magazine included Lyons' book The Brown Fat Revolution in its list of "Top 10 Notable New Diet Books"
