= Jim Lyons (footballer) =

Australian rules footballer

Personal information
- Full name: James Gordon Lyons
- Born: 5 April 1876; Carlton, Victoria
- Died: 26 December 1934 (aged 58)
- Original team: Parkville

Playing career^{1}
Years	Club	Games (Goals)
1897–98	Carlton	11 (0)
- ^{1} Playing statistics correct to the end of 1898.

James Gordon Lyons (5 April 1876 – 26 December 1934) was an Australian rules footballer who played with Carlton in the Victorian Football League (VFL).
