= James E. Lyons (politician) =

American politician

James Edwin Lyons (June 23, 1857 – June 1, 1943) was an American businessman and politician.

Born in Glasgow, Scotland, Lyons emigrated to the United States in 1868 and settled in Fond du Lac, Wisconsin. He then moved to Appleton, Wisconsin, and was in the general produce business. He served on the Appleton Common Council.

In 1899, Lyons moved to Colby, Wisconsin, and continued to work in the general produce business. Lyons served on the Colby Common Council and was also mayor of Colby, Wisconsin. In 1933, Lyons served in the Wisconsin State Assembly and was a Democrat. Lyons died in a hospital in Marshfield, Wisconsin, after falling and suffering a broken hip.
