= Christopher Lyon =

American political consultant

Christopher Lyon is a political consultant who has worked for Republican party candidates in Massachusetts, New York, New Hampshire, Virginia, Pennsylvania, Ohio, Illinois, Iowa, South Carolina, Florida, Arizona, California, Minnesota, North Carolina, Rhode Island, New Jersey, and on the national level.

According to The New York Times, "[Lyon] is sought-after, reviled and, according to foes and allies alike, good at what he does."

In 2000, Lyon worked for New Hampshire gubernatorial candidate Jeffrey Howard, and distributed flyers that pointed out the wife of opponent Gordon Humphrey was a member of an orgasm cult. Lyon found the orgasm cult issue in a column written by Jack Anderson, the legendary investigative journalist, in 1984. Mrs. Humphrey's very public connection to the strange group originally became an issue in Humphrey's 1984 re-election campaign against U.S. Rep. Norm D'Amours (D-N.H.). In a politically-influenced case, the New Hampshire state Attorney General issued a meaningless cease-and-desist order, almost one year after the campaign ended, to Lyon for failing to put a disclaimer on the mailing.

During the 2006 New Jersey Senate campaign, Lyon's unconventional and creative work as a subcontractor on the campaign of Republican Tom Kean Jr. earned that campaign additional attention. During the campaign, Lyon struck up a pen-pal relationship with a former Democratic Hudson County executive serving time in federal prison for accepting a bribe to seek information on opponent U.S. Senator Bob Menendez. Lyon's opposition research for the Kean campaign included work on a swiftboat-style movie said to show the complicity of Democratic incumbent Senator Bob Menendez in a 1980s case of corruption. That movie was never made, however. Before the campaign ended, the negative issues Lyon helped raise about Menendez caused then-U.S. Attorney Chris Christie to initiate a federal criminal investigation against the incumbent Democratic U.S. senator.

In February 2007, another high-profile piece of Lyon's work surfaced at the website The Smoking Gun. A memo prepared for the 1993 campaign of Rudy Giuliani for Mayor of New York City details Giuliani's potential political vulnerabilities on issues such as race, social stances, and his personal "weirdness factor".

According to The New York Times, "One New Jersey Republican consultant who has worked with Mr. Lyon described him as a relentless researcher who can trace money trails from records in county courthouse basements. As the consultant, who refused to be identified because it might damage his own political relationships, put it: 'He brings you the entire kitchen sink, and says, 'Look what I have brought you, a kitchen sink. Let's throw it at the guy.' You have to have a grown-up around who says, 'Well, I'm not sure we should throw the entire kitchen sink at the guy, but what an interesting brass spigot you found"
