= West (surname) =

West is an English surname.

Notable people with the name include:

== A ==
- Absolom M. West (1818–1894), American politician, and Confederate militia general
- Adam West (disambiguation), several people
- Addison West (born 2000), American football player
- Alan West (disambiguation), several people
- Albert West (1949–2015), Dutch singer
- Albert Benjamin West (1883–1929), American politician and lawyer
- Albert L. West (1825–1892), American architect
- Allen West (disambiguation), several people
- Allyson West, Trinidad and Tobago politician
- Almeda Lambert (née West), American cookbook writer and businessperson
- Andrew West (disambiguation), also Andy West, several people
- Anita West (born 1934), British former actress and television presenter
- Anthony West (disambiguation), several people

== B ==
- Barbara West (1911–2007), English Titanic survivor
- Barbara West (TV news anchor) (born 1948), American journalist
- Barbara Winifred West (1913–2014), British hockey player, coach, and administrator
- Belford West (1896–1973), American football player
- Benjamin West (disambiguation), also Ben West, several people
- Billy West (disambiguation), several people
- Bob West (born 1956), American voice actor
- Bob West (radio host) (1942–2016), American ethnomusicologist and radio host
- Brian West (disambiguation), several people

== C ==
- Catherine West (born 1966), English politician
- Cedric West (1918–1997), English jazz guitarist
- Chandra West (born 1970), Canadian actress
- Charcandrick West (born 1991), American football player
- Charles West (disambiguation), several people
- Chester H. West (1888–1935), American Medal of Honor recipient
- CJ West (born 2002), American football player
- Colin West (born 1962), English football player and coach
- Colin West (author) (born 1951), English children book writer and illustrator
- Colin West (footballer, born 1967), English football player
- Corinne West (born 1970), American singer-songwriter
- Corinne Michelle West (1908–1991), American painter
- Cornel West (born 1953), American philosopher, political activist, and writer

== D ==
- David West (disambiguation), several people
- Debi Mae West (born 1964), American voice actor
- Delonte West (born 1983), American basketball player
- Dominic West (born 1969), English actor
- Don West (disambiguation), several people
- Donald J. West (1924–2020), British psychiatrist
- Dorian West (born 1967), English rugby footballer
- Dot West, Australian screenwriter
- Dorothy West (1907–1998), American writer
- Dorothy West (actress) (1891–1980), American actress
- Dottie West (1932–1991), American country music singer and songwriter

== E ==
- Earl Irvin West (1920–2011), American church historian
- Ed West (disambiguation)
- Edmund West (disambiguation), several people
- Edward West (disambiguation), several people

== F ==
- Emilie West (1844–1907), Danish schoolteacher, proponent of needlework
- Florence West (disambiguation), several people
- Frederick West (disambiguation), also Fred West, several people

== G ==
- George West (disambiguation), several people
- Gilbert West (1703–1756), English poet
- Gladys West (1930–2026), American mathematician
- Gordon West (1943–2012), English footballer
- Gordon West (cricketer) (1923–2002), English cricketer
- Graeme West (born 1953), New Zealand rugby league footballer and coach
- Graham West (born 1973), Australian politician

== H ==
- Harry West (1917–2004), Irish politician
- Harry West (musician), American musician
- Henry West (disambiguation), several people
- Hershell West, American basketball player and coach

== I ==
- Isabelle Clark Percy West (1882–1976), American artist and educator

== J ==
- James West (disambiguation), several people
- Jane West (disambiguation), several people
- Jerry West (1938–2024), American basketball player and executive
- Jerry West, pseudonym of Andrew E. Svenson (1910–1975), American author and writer
- Jessamyn West (disambiguation), several people
- Jim West (disambiguation), several people
- Joseph West (disambiguation), also Joe West, several people
- Josephine Richards West (1853–1933), American mormon and suffragist
- John West (disambiguation), several people
- Josh West (disambiguation), several people
- Julian West, stage name of Nicolas de Gunzburg (1904–1981), French-American editor and bon-vivant

== K ==
- Kanye West (born 1977), American record producer and rapper
- Kit West (1936–2016), British special effects artist
- Kimber West (born 1974), Playboy Playmate

== L ==
- Lee Roy West (1929–2020), American judge
- Leslie West (1945–2020), American musician
- Leslie West (cricketer) (1905–1982), English cricketer
- Lizzie West (born 1973), American singer-songwriter
- Louis Jolyon West (1924–1999), American psychiatrist

== M ==
- Madeleine West (born 1980), Australian actress
- Mae West (1893–1980), American actress and screenwriter
- Margaret West (1903–1963), American heiress, vaudeville performer and radio hostess
- Margaretta Sully West (died 1810), American theater manager and stage actor
- Mark West (disambiguation), several people
- Martin West (disambiguation), several people
- Mary West (disambiguation), several people
- Mason West (born 2007), American ice hockey player
- Matt West, American actor and choreographer
- Matt West (baseball) (born 1988), American baseball player
- Matthew West (born 1977), American musician
- Matthew West (politician) (1801–1880), American politician
- Maura West (born 1972), American actress
- Michael West (disambiguation), also Mike West, several people
- Milton H. West (1888–1948), American politician
- Mollie Lieber West (1916–2015), American labor leader
- Moritz West (1840–1904), Austrian librettist
- Morris West (1916–1999), Australian writer
- Myrtice West (1923–2010), American self-taught painter

== N ==
- Nathan West (born 1978), American actor and musician
- Nathanael West (1903–1940), American novelist and playwright
- Nathaniel West (captain) (c. 1665–1723), Virginia colonial legislator
- Nicholas West (1461–1533), English bishop and diplomatist
- Nick West (disambiguation), several people
- Nigel West, pen-name of Rupert Allason (born 1951), British writer and politician
- Nina West (born 1978), American drag queen
- North West (born 2013), American singer and rapper

== O ==
- Oswald West (1873–1960), American politician
- Owen West (born 1969), American military officer and official
- Owen B. West (1869–1948), American politician, businessman, and farmer

== P ==
- Parker West, American dancer
- Paula West (born 1959), American jazz and cabaret singer
- Paul West (disambiguation), several people
- Pennerton West (1913–1965), American artist
- Peter West (1920–2003), British TV presenter and sports commentator
- Peter West (footballer) (1931–2010), Australian rules footballer
- Peter West (physicist) (born 1951), British physicist

== R ==
- Randy West (disambiguation), several people
- Rebecca West (1892–1983), British-Irish writer
- Red West (1936–2017), American actor, film stuntman and songwriter
- Reginald West, 6th Baron De La Warr (1395–1450), English noble
- Richard West (disambiguation), several people
- Robert West (disambiguation), several people
- Rose West (born 1953), British serial killer

== S ==
- Samuel West (disambiguation), also Sam West, several people
- Sandra Márjá West (born 1990), Norwegian Sami politician and festival manager of Riddu Riđđu
- Scott West (born 1974), Australian rules footballer
- Shane West (born 1978), American actor, singer and songwriter
- Shelly West (born 1958), American country music singer
- Simon West (born 1961), English film director
- Speedy West (1924–2003), American pedal steel guitarist and record producer
- Spencer West (born 1981), American motivational speaker and disability advocate
- Stan West (1926–2005), American football player
- Steve West (darts player) (born 1975), English darts player
- Stewart West (1934–2023), Australian politician
- Stu West (born 1964), English musician
- Stuart West, British evolutionary biologist

== T ==
- T. J. West (1885–1916) of West's Limited, English cinema chain
- Taribo West (born 1974), Nigerian footballer
- Temple West (1714–1757), British admiral
- Thomas West (disambiguation), also Tom West, several people
- Ti West (born 1980), American filmmaker
- Timothy West (1934–2024), English actor
- Togo D. West Jr. (1942–2018), African-American attorney
- Trevor West (1938–2012), Irish mathematician, academic and politician
- Tyre West (born 2003), American football player

== V ==
- Vita Sackville-West (1892–1962), English poet, novelist and gardener

== W ==
- Wallace West (1900–1980), American science fiction writer
- Walter West (disambiguation), several people
- Will West Long (c. 1869–1947), Cherokee mask maker, a translator, and a Cherokee cultural historian
- William West (disambiguation), several people
- Winifred West (1881–1971), Australian educationist

== Y ==
- Yael Averbuch West (born 1986), American soccer player and executive

== Fictional characters ==
- Herbert West, a character in the works of H. P. Lovecraft
- Honey West, a fictional detective in the works of G. G. Fickling
- Iris West, a character in DC Comics
- Josh West, a character in the Australian soap opera Home and Away
- Nathan West, a character in the American soap opera General Hospital
- Sherri West, a district attorney, appearing on Law & Order: Special Victims Unit
- Wallace West (character), a character in DC Comics
- Wally West, a DC Comics superhero known for being the first Kid Flash and third Flash

== See also ==
- Baron West
