= William West =

William West may refer to:

== Arts and entertainment ==
- William West (artist) (1801–1861), English artist (of Bristol)
- William West (director) of Flying Wild
- William H. West (entertainer) (1853–1902), American minstrel show producer
- William Edward West (1788–1859), American painter
- William E. West Sr. (1922–2014), American painter
- William West Anderson (1928–2017), birth name of American actor Adam West

== Law and politics ==
- William West (Rhode Island politician) (c. 1733–1816), American militia general in the American Revolutionary War and later political leader
- William West, 1st Baron De La Warr (c. 1520–1595), British political figure
- William H. West (judge) (1824–1911), politician and member of the Ohio Supreme Court, 1872–1873
- William H. West (policeman) (1842–1915), soldier and police officer
- William H. West (Louisiana politician) (1928-2016), American politician and educator
- William West (legal writer) (c. 1548–1598), English lawyer, known as the author of Symbolæographia
- William Stanley West (1849–1914), U.S. senator from Georgia
- William West (1612–1670), English politician
- William J. West (Canadian politician) (1892–1985), member of the Legislative Assembly of New Brunswick
- William J. West (UK politician) (1868–?), British politician and trade unionist

== Science ==
- William West (chemist) (1792–1851), English chemist of the Leeds Philosophical and Literary Society
- William West (botanist) (1848–1914), English botanist
- William West Jr (1875–1901), English botanist
- William James West (died 1848), English surgeon and apothecary
- William Dixon West (1901–1994), English geologist

== Sport ==
- William West (sailor) (born 1931), Canadian Olympic sailor
- William West (umpire) (1863–1938), cricketer and test match umpire
- William West (equestrian) (1887–1953), American equestrian
- Willie West (born 1938), American football defensive back
- Wild Bill West (1875–?), American baseball player
- Billy West (baseball) (William O. West, 1853–1928), baseball player
- Bill West (racing driver) (1927–2017), American stock car racing driver

== Other ==
- William West (antiquary) (1770–1854), English bookseller and antiquary
- William Marcus West (fl. 1830s), Scottish-American pioneer

== See also ==
- Billy West (disambiguation)
- West (name)
- William (name)
- William Cornwallis-West (1835–1917), British politician
