= James West =

James or Jim West may refer to:

== Business and industry ==
- James Marion West Sr. (1871–1941), Texas businessman and political figure
- James Marion West Jr. (1903–1957), Texas businessman
- James West (inventor) (born 1931), American engineer, co-inventor of the electret microphone

== Law and politics ==
- James West (antiquary) (1703–1772), English politician and antiquary, president of the Royal Society
- James E. West (politician) (1951–2006), American politician, mayor of Spokane, Washington
- James I. West Jr. (1930–2014), American politician, member of the Georgia House of Representatives

== Sports ==
- James West (football manager) (fl. 1900), British football manager
- James West (golfer) (1885–1968), English golfer
- James West (Scottish footballer) (1891–?), Scottish footballer
- Jim West (baseball) (1911–1970), American Negro league baseball player
- Jim West (sportscaster) (1929–2024), American sports announcer
- Jim West (boxer) (1954–2015), Australian boxer
- James West (Canadian football) (born 1955), Canadian football player
- Jim West (footballer) (born 1966), Australian footballer
- Jim West (cricketer) (born 1982), Bermudian cricketer
- James West (runner) (born 1996), English middle-distance runner

== Others ==
- James E. West (Scouting) (1876–1948), first Chief Scout Executive of the Boy Scouts of America
- James Grey West (1885–1951), British architect
- J. B. West (James Bernard West, 1912–1983), Chief Usher of the White House
- James West (physician) (1914–2012), American physician, psychiatrist and surgeon
- James R. West (1946–2021), American trumpet player and teacher
- Jim West (guitarist) (born 1953), American guitarist, film and TV composer
- Jim West (biblical scholar) (born 1960), Christian pacifist biblical scholar and activist
- James West (Australian journalist) (born 1982), Australian journalist and author

== See also ==
- Jeffrey James West (born 1950), principal of historical buildings in England
