= Sports and recreation in Bermuda =

Sports in British territory

A variety of sports are played in British Overseas Territory of Bermuda, from those brought by British and International relations (namely Cricket, football, rugby football, and tennis), and sail racing). Some sports and events have greater historical and cultural significance whilst others are played for entertainment or competition.

== British influence ==
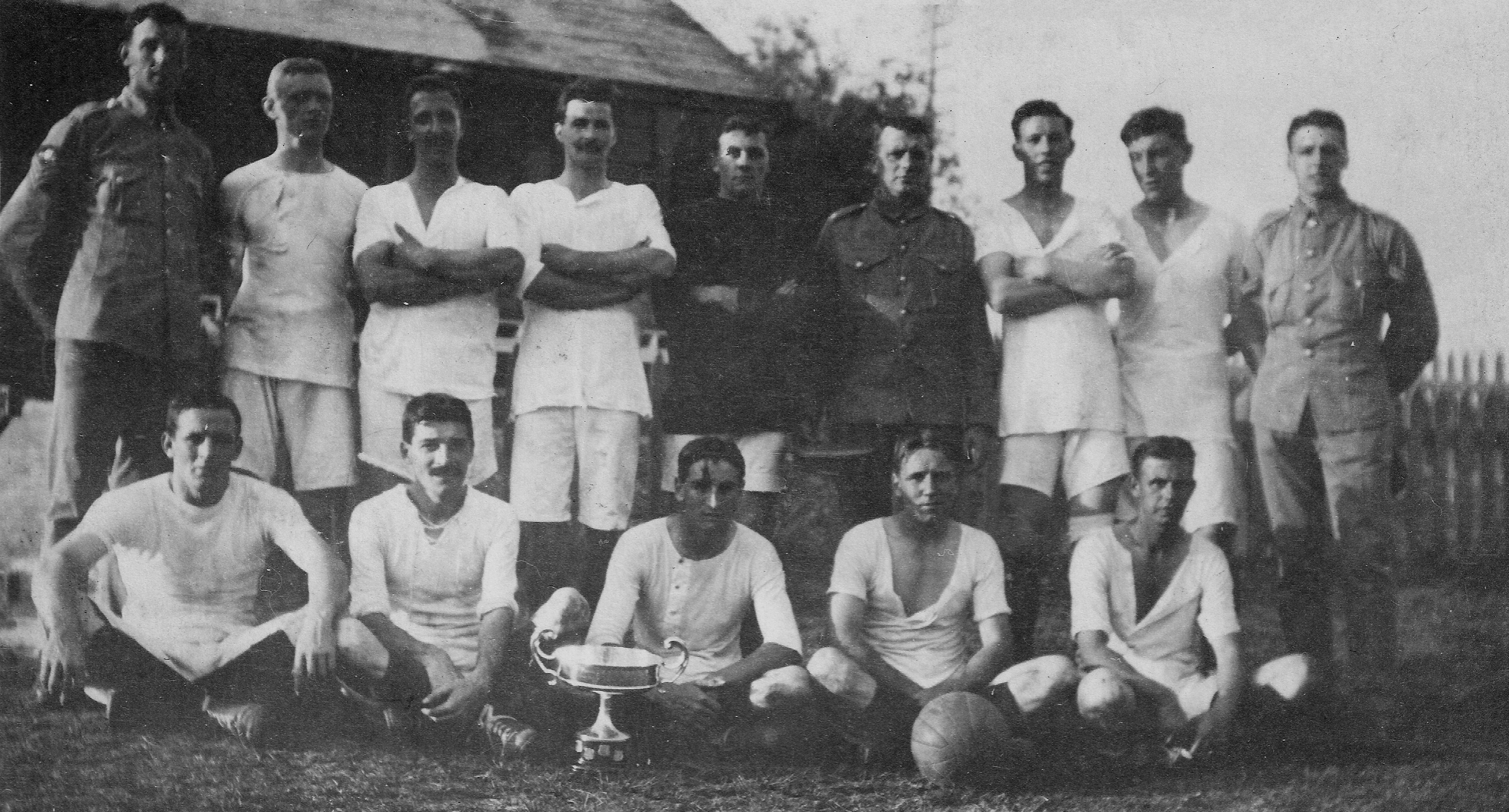
The football team of 95 Company, Royal Garrison Artillery, victors in the 1917 Governor's Cup football match, pose with the cup. The cup was contested for annually by teams from the various Royal Navy, British Army Bermuda Garrison, and Royal Air Force units stationed in Bermuda.

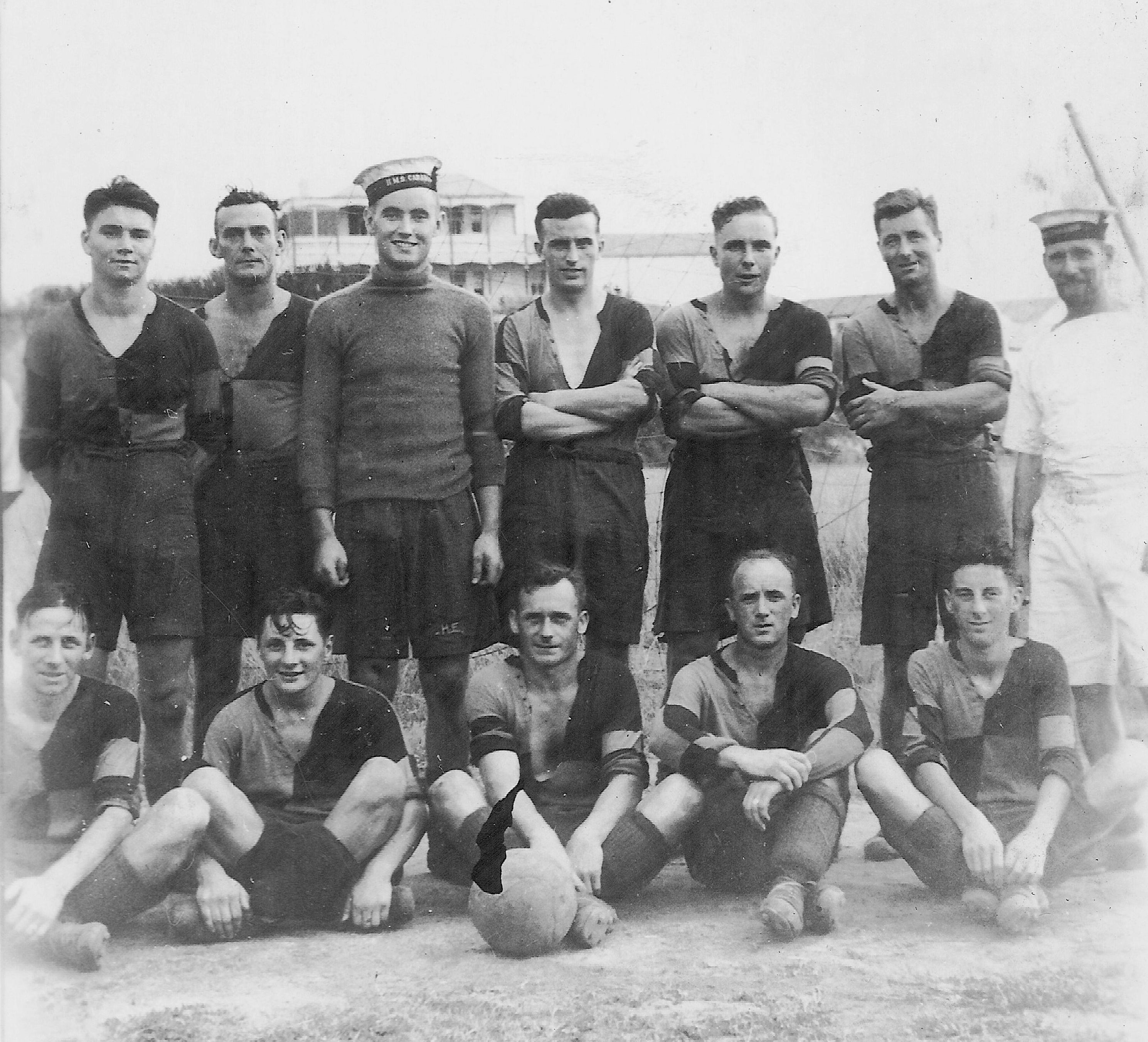
HMS Caradoc football team on Moresby Plain at the Royal Naval Dockyard, circa 1928

Many sports popular today were formalised by British public schools and universities in the Nineteenth Century. These schools produced the civil servants and military and naval officers required to build and maintain the British Empire, and team sports were a vital tool for training their students to think and act as part of a team. Former public schoolboys continued to pursue these activities, and founded organisations such as The Football Association (FA). Today's association of football with the working classes began when the FA changed its rules to allow professional players in 1885. They soon displaced the amateur ex-Public schoolboys. The armed forces encouraged competitive and team sports for all ranks for the same reasons public schools did. Bermuda's role as the primary Royal Navy base in the Western Hemisphere, with an army garrison to match, ensured that the naval and military personnel quickly introduced the newly formalised sports to Bermuda, including cricket, football, Rugby football, golf, and even tennis and rowing (rowing did not adapt well from British rivers to the stormy Atlantic, and the officers soon switched to sail racing, founding the Royal Bermuda Yacht Club). Once these sports reached Bermuda, they were eagerly adopted by Bermudians.

In Bermuda, cricket and football (soccer) are the most popular sports. Cricket in particular now has a two-day (not including the weekend) holiday dedicated to it, called Cup Match. This tournament continues a tradition that began in 1872 when Captain Moresby of the Royal Navy introduced the game to Bermuda, holding a match at Somerset to mark "forty years since the unjust thraldom of slavery". The formation of civilian clubs followed, though black Bermudians were not permitted to join the first clubs, which were established by whites. Cricket became popular among blacks following the 1895 formation of the Bermuda Militia Artillery, a part-time reserve of the Royal Artillery that recruited blacks. Many blacks were consequently introduced to cricket in the army, and soon formed clubs of their own. The first Cup Match was played in 1902. The East End versus West End rivalry resulted from the locations of the St. George's Garrison (the original army headquarters in Bermuda) on Barrack Hill, St. George's, and the Royal Naval Dockyard at Ireland Island. Moresby founded the Somerset Cricket Club, located near to Royal Navy Field in Somerset, which plays the St. George's Cricket Club, based at Wellington Oval in Wellington (named for Field Marshall Arthur Wellesley, 1st Duke of Wellington, former Commander-in-Chief of the British Army), St. George's, in this game. The whole of Bermuda ground to a complete halt for two days every summer to turn its attention to this cricket game. Venues of the game change yearly between both clubs. The popularity of the annual game was such that it caused continued absences from employment. As a direct result, the 2-day public holiday was first introduced in 1947 and has been in effect ever since. The two days (currently called Emancipation Day and Mary Prince Day (until 2019 Somers Day)) feature a single Cricket match between teams from both ends of the island, a match has been played for over a century. The Island's national Cricket team has also competed internationally.

Football did not become popular with Bermudians 'til after the Second World War, though teams from the various Royal Navy, British Army Bermuda Garrison, and Royal Air Force units of Bermuda had competed annually for the Governor's Cup introduced by Major-General Sir George Mackworth Bullock in 1913 (there were also Governor's Cups for other sports, including cricket and golf). Although most of its members had never played football before joining the army, a combined team of the Bermuda Militia Artillery (BMA) and the Bermuda Militia Infantry (BMI) defeated HMS Malabar to win the cup on 21 March, 1943, becoming the first team of a locally raised unit to do so, and the third British Army team to do so since 1926.

== Golf ==
Bermuda holds the most golf courses per square mile in the world. The golf courses on the island are quite distinct as they are generally short, and their turf hard and sandy. The wind is also higher as unblocked gusts from the sea-facing side of a course can sometimes affect the accuracy of a golf swing. Bermuda's hilly terrain is apparent at some of the island's golf courses. Bermuda holds number of golf tournaments and events annually held by the Bermuda Golf Association. One of the most popular annual tournaments is the Bermuda Open. Bermudian Quinn Talbot, who lost an arm in a motorcycle crash in 1969, was both the United States National Amputee Golf Champion for five successive years and the British World One-Arm Golf Champion.

== Water sports ==
Bermuda is an island with a history of sailing and a number of sailing clubs, it is no surprise that sailing has been historically a popular sport. Namely, dinghy racing is seen as the main competitive sport. Unsurprisingly, most Bermudians swim, and Bermudians compete in swimming competitions in the Caribbean and elsewhere. Bermudians also enjoy non-competitive sports like diving and fishing. Bermuda hosted the 2017 America's Cup being the 35th staging of the America's Cup yacht race. The challenger, Emirates Team New Zealand, won by a score of 7 to 1 over the defender, Oracle Team USA. It was held on the Great Sound in Bermuda from June 17 to June 26. The sporting event brought a major increase in jobs and tourism to the island.

== Basketball ==
In Bermuda, Basketball is played competitively nationally and internationally. At the Caribbean Basketball Championship Bermuda beat countries with many times its population size. The country has access to multiple basketball facilities.

== Pickleball ==
Founded in October 2022, the Pickleball Association of Bermuda (PAB) was recognized as Bermuda's national governing body for the sport of pickleball in March 2023. In November 2024, the PAB hosted its inaugural Bermuda National Pickleball Championships at the W.E.R. Joell Tennis Stadium near Hamilton.

== Squash ==
Squash has seen a surge in popularity since the squash world championships were held on the island in 2017. Additionally, junior squash has flourished on the island with many junior Bermudian squash players applying their trade overseas in top squash organisations. At the Caribbean Area Squash Championships, Bermuda tends to place well fending off countries such as Jamaica and Guyana that are many times the countries respective population size.

== International sport ==
Generally, Bermudians match poorly in international competition due to the territory's small population size, and mostly compete in individual events in international competition. Bermuda is often represented in the Olympic Games, and it has won two medals; a Bronze in boxing and Gold in the Women's triathlon. Bermuda also participates in the Americas' Cup Sailing Competitions with some success.

== Other ==
Other popular sports include various equestrian forms including pony-cart racing and dressage, Futsal, rugby, squash and tennis. See rugby union in Bermuda. Motorsports are gaining in popularity, particularly after the construction of Bermuda Motorsports Park. Australian rules football is also gaining popularity and the island hosted the Australian Rules Football Championships in April 2007, an international tournament featuring sides from Canada, the United States, Europe and the Bermuda Lions national team. Bermuda Fitted Dinghy racing – in which a number of small punts outfitted with huge sails and a crew of six race each other and frequently sink – has been declining in popularity over the years. Lacrosse grew in popularity on the island, but is now declining in popularity. In 2006 Bermuda was represented at the ILF world championships of lacrosse in Ontario, Canada. Bermuda is an affiliate nation of the International Lacrosse Federation. Competitive Netball has grown popular within schools.

In 2017, Adam Hall became the first professional Bermudan baseball player.

== Notable sporting figures ==
=== 1900 to 1970 ===
- Edwin Frederick Spinks (1902 in Bermuda – 1982 in Orsett) was a Bermudan cricketer who played first-class cricket for Essex
- Alma Victor "Champ" Hunt, OBE (1 October 1910 – 5 March 1999) was a Bermudian and Scottish cricketer.
- Carlyle Crockwell MBE (1932 in Bermuda – 2015) was a FIFA-certified Bermudian football referee
- Lloyd James (born 1937 in Bermuda) is a former Bermudian cricketer – a right-handed batsman and right-arm medium-fast bowler. He played one first-class match for Bermuda, against New Zealand in 1972
- Clarence Hill (born 1951 in Bermuda) is a retired Bermudian boxer. At the 1976 Summer Olympics he won the Heavyweight bronze medal. He is Bermuda's first Olympic medallist.
- Clarence Parfitt (born 1944) is a former Bermudian and Scottish cricketer.
- Robert Burgess (born 1952 in Bermuda) is a retired amateur boxer who competed at the 1976 Summer Olympics
- Roger Dill (born 1957 in Bermuda) is an international cricket umpire and a sergeant in the Bermudian fire brigade.
- Michael Watson (born 1958 in Bermuda) is a Bermudan Olympic middle-distance runner. He competed in the men's 1500 meters and the men's 800 meters at the 1988 Summer Olympics
- Mark Wyatt (born in Bermuda 1961) is a former Canadian rugby union footballer – a fullback and a fly-half
- Anthony Amory (born 1963 in Bermuda) is a former Bermudian cricketer – a left-handed batsman who bowled medium pace
- Dennis Archer (born 1963 in Barbados) is a Bermudian cricketer – a right-handed batsman and a right-arm medium-pace bowler
- Garvin Aparicio (born 1970 in Bermuda) is a former Bermudian cricketer – a left-handed batsman.

=== 1970 to date ===
- Chris Flook (born 1973 in Bermuda) is an Olympic and national record holding swimmer from Bermuda. He swam for Bermuda at the 1992 Summer Olympics
- Nigel Burgess (born 1981 in Bermuda) is a Bermudian international footballer and rugby union player
- Nick Kyme (born 1981 in Bermuda) is a Bermudian international-level squash player from Bermuda
- James West (born 1982 in Bermuda) is a Bermudian cricketer – a right-handed batsman who bowls right-arm medium-fast
- Marcus Bateman (born 1982 in Bermuda) is a British rower. He learnt to row at the University of Bath
- Graham Smith (born 1982 in Bermuda) is an international-level swimmer from Bermuda
- Dion Stovell (born 1984 in Bermuda) is a Bermudian cricketer and football player – a right-handed batsman who bowls right-arm off break. He also plays football as a striker for Somerset Trojans
- Dame Flora Duffy (born 1987 in Bermuda) is a Bermudian Triathlete – Won gold in the 2020 Tokyo summer Olympics, multiple Commonwealth gold, and multiple world series amongst other awards.
- Justin Pitcher (born 1987 in Bermuda) is a Bermudian cricketer – a right-handed batsman who bowls right-arm medium-fast
- Terryn Fray (born 1991 in Bermuda) is a Bermudian cricketer – a right-handed batsman who bowls right-arm medium pace
- Damali Bell (born 1992 in Bermuda) is a Bermudian cricketer – a right-handed batsman who bowls left-arm medium pace
- Joshua Gilbert (born 1993 in Bermuda) is a Bermudian cricketer – a right-handed batsman who bowls right-arm off break
- Delray Rawlins (born 1997 in Bermuda) is a Bermudian international cricketer currently listed with Sussex in English county cricket
- Adam Hall (born 1999 in Bermuda) is a Bermudian professional baseball player in the Milwaukee Brewers organization (Drafted in round 2 of the 2017 draft)
