= Public holidays in Bermuda =

This is a list of regular named Holidays in Bermuda. Every Sunday is also considered a holiday.

Name	2015 Date	2016 Date	2017 Date	2018 Date	2019 Date	2020 Date	2021 Date	2022 Date	2023 Date	2024 Date	2025 Date	2026 Date	Remarks
New Year's Day	1 January	1 January	2 January	1 January	1 January	1 January	1 January	3 January	2 January	1 January	1 January	1 January	if on a weekend, will be moved to the next Monday
Good Friday	3 April	25 March	14 April	30 March	19 April	10 April	2 April	15 April	7 April	29 March	18 April	3 April	Notable for extensive Bermuda kite flying.
Bermuda Day	25 May	24 May	24 May	25 May	24 May	29 May	28 May	27 May	26 May	24 May	23 May	22 May	Previously known as Victoria Day, Empire Day, and Commonwealth Day.
National Heroes Day	15 June	20 June	19 June	18 June	17 June	15 June	21 June	20 June	19 June	17 June	16 June	15 June	This holiday began in 2008, first commemorated on 12 October 2008 and was moved to replace the Queen's Official Birthday in 2009.
Emancipation Day	30 July	28 July	3 August	2 August	1 August	30 July	29 July	28 July	3 August	1 August	31 July	30 July	First day of Cup Match; formerly Cup Match Day until 2000.
Mary Prince Day	31 July	29 July	4 August	3 August	2 August	31 July	30 July	29 July	4 August	2 August	1 August	31 July	Second day of Cup Match. Named after Mary Prince, until 2020 was known as Somers' Day after Sir George Somers.
Labour Day	7 September	5 September	4 September	3 September	2 September	7 September	6 September	5 September	4 September	2 September	1 September	7 September	Established in 1982. The symbolic end of summer.
Remembrance Day	11 November	11 November	13 November	12 November	11 November	11 November	11 November	11 November	13 November	11 November	11 November	11 November	A service is held at the cenotaph in Hamilton; if on a weekend, will be moved to the next Monday
Christmas Day	25 December	27 December	25 December	25 December	25 December	25 December	27 December	26 December	25 December	25 December	25 December	25 December	normally the 25th, but the day off will be moved, if on a weekend
Boxing Day	28 December	26 December	26 December	26 December	26 December	28 December	28 December	27 December	26 December	26 December	26 December	26 December	normally the 26th, but the day off will be moved, if on a weekend

There are exceptional Holidays from time to time. E.g. 8 May 2023 was such a public holiday to commemorate the King's Coronation.

== Nature of Public Holidays ==
The official list of Public Holidays was set out in 1947 in the Public Holidays Act. Since the Act has been amended a number of times including in 2009 to move the National Heroes Day from October to June to replace the Queen's Official Holiday and the replacement of Somers' Day with Mary Prince Day in 2020.

Emancipation Day and Mary Prince Day (formerly Cup Match Day and Somers' Day) which last two days, are know together be known as Cup Match, during which an intra-island cricket game is played between the Somerset Cricket Club in the east of the island and St. George's Cricket Club in the west. The Cup Match was created to celebrate and commemorate the emancipation of enslaved people in Bermuda and has taken place since at least 1902.

Public holidays featured nearly a complete shut-down of Bermuda, with all public offices and stores closed. Not only was the sale of goods on public holidays made illegal, but offering items for sale and even allowing customers into a store constituted an offense. Hotel restaurants, pharmacies and stores that had been granted special licenses by the government were exempted from this.

In March 2005, the Bermuda government passed a major amendment to the Act that allowed stores to finally open. It required that employers give their staff at least seven days (written) notice of a need for their service; it also required that employers inform those employees of their right to refuse, and prohibited any sort of disciplinary action or dismissal for employees who did refuse.
