= Edward West =

Edward West may refer to:

- Sir Edward West (economist and judge) (1782–1828), British economist and judge
- Ted West (1930–2002, born Edward West), English professional footballer
- Edward Nason West (1909–1990), American priest
- Edward William West (1824-1905), English engineer, orientalist and translator

== See also ==
- Ed West (disambiguation)
- Edmund West (disambiguation)

Middle name

- Sir Algernon West GCB JP (1832–1921), English civil servant
- Dorian West MBE (born 1967), English former rugby union footballer
- Ernest E. West (American football) (1867–1914), American football player and coach
- James E. West (Scouting) (1876–1948), American Chief Scout Executive, civil rights activist and lawyer
- James West (inventor) (born 1931, second and third names Edward Maceo), American engineer, inventor and scientist
- John E. W. Thompson (1860–1918, second and third names Edward West), American physician and diplomat
- John West (Australian politician) (1852–1931), English-born Australian politician and trade unionist
- John West (cricketer, born 1861) (1861–1920), English cricketer and umpire
- Max West (1916–2003), American baseball player
- Sean West (born 1986), American former baseball pitcher
- William Edward West (1788–1859), American painter
