= Westie =

Westie, or Westy may refer to:

== People ==
- Westie (person) or Westy, someone who comes from the Western suburbs of Auckland, New Zealand or Sydney, Australia
- Westie, someone who dances the West coast swing
- Westies, a nickname for members of Principia College's Rackham Court West or Lowrey House
- The Westies, nickname for the Royal Westminster Regiment of the Canadian Forces
- "Westy", a common nickname of people with the surname "West" or a similar name

== Organizations and companies ==
- The Westies, an Irish American gang from New York City, United States
- The Westies, an Irish gang from Blanchardstown in Dublin, Ireland
- Westfield Sportscars, a manufacturer from Kingswinford, England
- West Adelaide Football Club, an Australian rules football club from Adelaide, South Australia

== Entertainment ==
- The Westies (TV series), 2026 TV series on MGM+
- "Westy Gals", a single by Auckland singer Jan Hellriegel
- Rock of the Westies, an album by Elton John

== Other uses ==
- West Highland White Terrier, a breed of dog
- Westy, a suburban district in Warrington, England
- Camper vans made by Westfalia, primarily based on Volkswagen vans

== See also ==
- Westi (Westinghouse Terminal Interactive), an early local teleprocessing package for IBM's DOS/VSE environment
