= Peter West (disambiguation) =

Peter West may refer to:

- Peter West (1920-2003), BBC presenter and sports commentator
- Peter West (footballer) (1931-2010), Australian sports player
- Peter West (physicist) (born 1951), British supersymmetry scientist
