= Frederick West =

Freddie, Fred or Frederick West may refer to:

== Politicians ==
- Frederick West (1767–1852), British MP for Denbigh, younger son of John West, 2nd Earl De La Warr
- Frederick Richard West (1799–1862), his son, British MP for Denbigh and East Grinstead, father of William Cornwallis-West

== Sportspeople ==
- Fred West (footballer, born 1905) (1905–1953), Australian footballer for Hawthorn
- Fred West (footballer, born 1929) (1929–2011), Australian footballer for Collingwood
- Fred West (basketball) (born c.1969), American power forward

== Others ==
- Frederick T. West (1893–1989), American orthodontist
- Freddie West (1896–1988), English aviator and recipient of First World War Victoria Cross
- Fred West (1941–1995), English serial killer
