= Charles West =

Charles or Charlie West may refer to:

== Law and politics ==
- Charles S. West (1829–1885), American judge and politician
- Charles F. West (politician) (1895–1955), U.S. representative from Ohio
- Charles P. West (1921–2015), American politician
- Charles West (Oklahoma politician) (1872–?), attorney general of Oklahoma, 1907–1915

== Sports ==
- Charlie West (footballer, born 1884) (1884–1962), Australian rules footballer
- Charles A. West (1890–1957), American basketball and football coach
- Charles Fremont West (1899–1979), American track athlete and college football player and coach
- Charlie West (American football) (born 1946), American football player
- Charlie West (footballer, born 2006), Australian rules footballer

== Others ==
- Charles West, 5th Baron De La Warr (1626–1687), English nobleman
- Charles West (physician) (1816–1898), British physician
- Charles Dickinson West (1847–1908), Irish mechanical engineer and naval architect
- Charles West (actor) (1885–1943), American silent film actor
- Charles F. West (aviator) (1899–1972), American pioneer aviator
- Charles West (author) (1927–2022), British crime mystery writer and actor

== See also ==
- Charles Sackville-West, 6th Earl De La Warr (1815–1873), British soldier
- Charles Sackville-West, 4th Baron Sackville (1870–1962), British Army general and peer
