= Rick West =

Rick West may refer to:

- Rick West (sailor), Master Chief Petty Officer of the US Navy
- Rick C. West, Canadian arachnologist
- Rick West (Oklahoma politician), member of the Oklahoma House of Representatives
- Rick West (Virginia politician), mayor of Chesapeake, Virginia

== See also ==
- Richard West (disambiguation)
