= Michael West =

Michael West may refer to:

- Michael West (British Army officer) (1905–1978), British general
- Michael West (footballer) (born 1991), English footballer
- Michael West (journalist), Australian investigative journalist
- Michael West (playwright) (born 1967), Irish writer
- Michael Philip West (1888–1973), English teacher and researcher who served in India
- Michael D. West (born 1953), American gerontologist and CEO of BioTime
- Mike West (swimmer) (born 1964), Canadian Olympic backstroke medalist
- Mike West (statistician)
- Corinne Michelle West, American painter who went by the name Michael West (and briefly Mikael West)
