= Anthony West =

Anthony West may refer to:

- Anthony West (author) (1914–1987), British author and literary critic
- Anthony West (motorcyclist) (born 1981), Australian Grand Prix motorcycle road racer
- Anthony C. West (1910–1988), Irish writer
- Anthony R. West (born 1947), British chemist and materials scientist
- Anthony West (musician), in Oh Wonder
- John Anthony West (1932–2018), American author

== See also ==
- Tony West (disambiguation)
