= Wally West (disambiguation) =

Wally West is a DC Comics fictional character and the third Flash.

Wally West may also refer to:

- Wallace West (character), a cousin to the Silver Age DC Comics character and the third Kid Flash
- Wallace West (1900–1980), American science fiction writer

== See also ==
- Walter West (disambiguation)
