= Billy West (disambiguation) =

Billy West (born 1952) is an American voice actor, comedian, singer and musician.

Billy West may also refer to:

- Billy West (baseball) (1853–1928), professional baseball player
- Billy West (silent film actor) (1892–1975), American film actor, producer and director
- Billy West, a robot character from the Futurama episode "The Silence of the Clamps"

== See also ==
- William West (disambiguation)
