= The Great Excelsior Jazz Band =

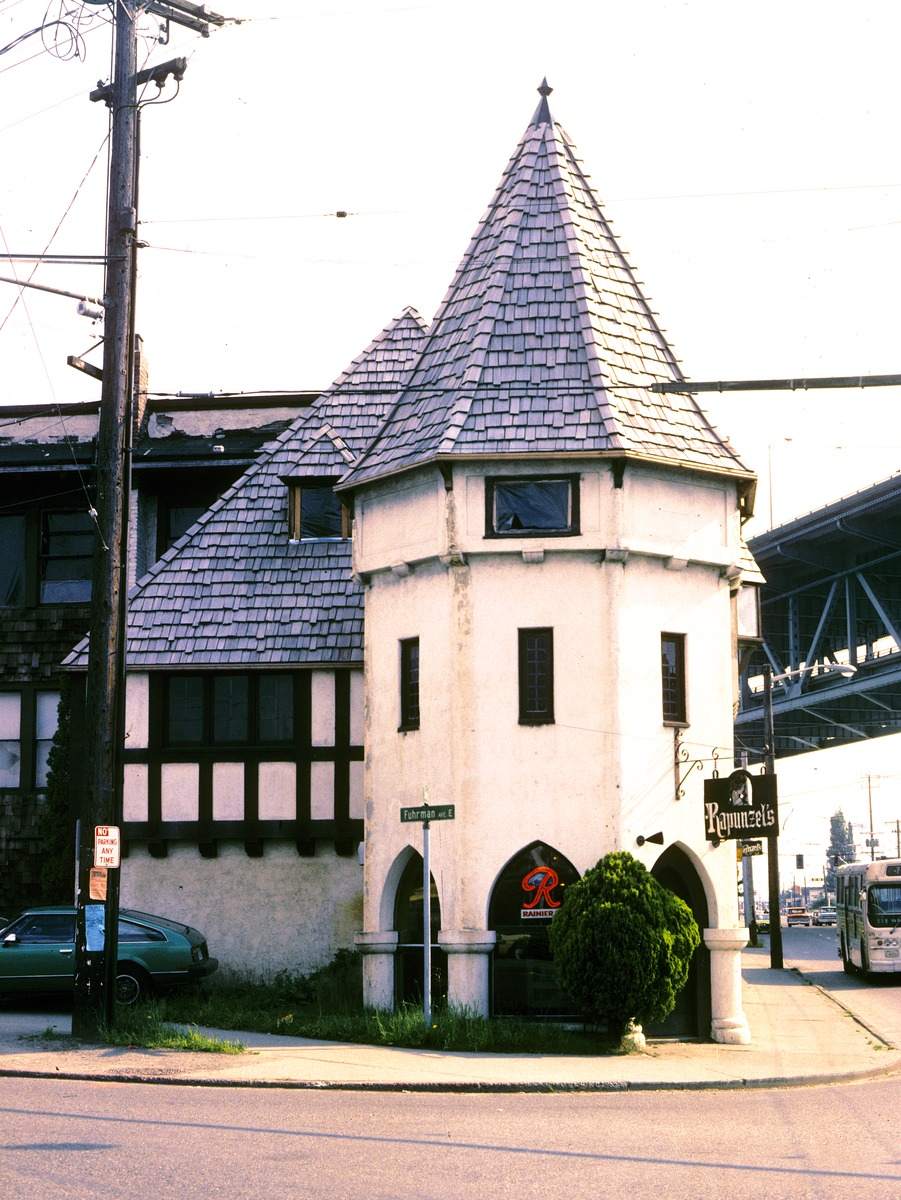
Rapunzel's, circa 1970s (37948508331)

The Great Excelsior Jazz Band was formed in Seattle in 1962. It was active in the Seattle area until 2003. Original members included Ray Skjelbred piano, Bob Jackson (1943–2020) trumpet, Bob McCallister (1942–2012) trombone, Mike Duffy (1943–2019) bass, Rich Adams clarinet and Ed Alsman Drums. They did not want to be considered Trad or Dixieland. Bass player Mike Duffy felt the band approximated a type of jazz played by territory bands that crossed the country between the wars, roughly 1920 to 1940. He said "They had their own style, a kind of a rough charm." In a larger sense, their style was summed up by sax player Bob Wilber who said “We didn't want to imitate their records. We wanted to play in their style but be creative at the same time.” The Great Excelsior Jazz Band's first gigs occurred during the Seattle World's Fair at the West Side Inn (1317 Harbor Ave SW, later The Embers) in West Seattle. Their motto was "No man stands so tall, as when he stoops to help a starving musician."

== Gigs ==
On June 5, 1962, there was a special night out for 300 graduates of Bellevue High School class of 1962. It began at the Olympic Hotel, where they were entertained by Carol Channing, the Brothers Four, and the Four Preps, next to the new Elks Club on Lake Union, where they danced the night away to the music of the Great Excelsior Jazz Band, who at the time had a nightly gig at the West Side Inn. In 1964 the Great Excelsior Jazz Band began two year long run playing at the club Pete's Poop Deck in Pioneer Square. On Sunday, April 21, 1968, there was a "Media Mash" at the Eagles Auditorium, featuring the Great Excelsior Jazz Band along with other several Seattle bands including The Magic Fern, Time Machine, Canterbury Tales, Tall Timber Boys, Cosmic Funk and Blues Feedback, playing from noon to midnight. A light show was provided by Lux Sit & Dance and the Conglomerate Light Co. The mash continued a week later with the piano drop in Duvall, Washington; admission to the piano drop was free to those who had attended the concert at Eagles. Both events were benefits for the underground newspaper Helix and the radio station KRAB-FM. The upright piano was dropped from a helicopter, after first appearing suspended by a steel cable. It was part of an all day happening. Music for the piano drop was by Country Joe and the Fish. In 1968 they were hired to promote Richard A. C. Greene, candidate for Washington state land commissioner. They created musical radio spots, often using penny whistle, washboard and kazoo, and also appeared at events, including one at the Seattle Zoo (Warren G. Harding Bandstand, behind the Ape House). In the news spot for that event, the columnist Emmett Watson refers to the candidate as "Richard AC-DC Greene." October 29, 1968 On May 2, 1969, The Great Excelsior Jazz Band played on the boat Sightseer, on a Lake Washington cruise from 8:00 p.m. to midnight. That cruise was so successful, they followed it with a Christmas Cruise on the steam ship Virginia V on December 19, 1971.

In 1972 The Great Excelsior Jazz Band began a relationship with the Seattle Jazz Society. On May 6, 1972, they played a jazz cruise on the Virginia V, sponsored by the Jazz Society, that almost immediately sold out. The relationship with the Jazz Society continued for several years. It began with the band appearing each weekend at the Jazz Gallery, sponsored by the Jazz Society, at 3450 Eastlake East. The building housing the Jazz Gallery had been built as a private residence in 1916, with a distinctive tower suggesting medieval days. The building was remodeled into a store by Fred Anhalt in the 1920s. Since then it has housed a variety of different cafes. The weekly gig ended in November 1973 when the Jazz Gallery lost its lease. The Jazz Society, which once had over a thousand members, continued on at various locations for a couple of years, and then closed down in 1978.

In 1975, The Puget Sound Traditional Jazz Society was formed, and began a relationship with the Great Excelsior Jazz Band that continued for 20 years. The Puget Sound Traditional Jazz Society and the Great Excelsior Band appeared in many venues the next several years, including The Blue Banjo, The Bombay Bicycle Shop, The Russian Center, The University Tower Hotel, and others, before finally settling into the Mountaineers Club (300 3rd Ave W) for weekly events into the mid-1980s. In early 1978 The Great Excelsior Band began a one night each week gig at Skipper's Tavern (2307 Eastlake E) that lasted into the mid-1980. That was followed by a once a week gig at the Owl Tavern in Ballard. That gig lasted into 1989. The band appeared at the Port Townsend Jazz Festival February 24–26, 1984. They appeared at the San Juan Island Dixieland Jazz Festival in Friday Harbor July 26–28, 1985. In 1989 the band began a new once a week gig at the New Orleans Cafe in Pioneer Square. The Great Excelsior Jazz Band became inactive in 1991. They played a reunion gig, sponsored by the Puget Sound Traditional Jazz Society, on July 16, 1995, at the Mountaineer's Club. On November 9, 2003, the Great Excelsior Jazz Band played a reunion gig at the New Orleans Cafe.

== Recordings ==
- Claire Austin and the Great Excelsior Jazz Band, 1965 GBH Records, LP
- The Great Excelsior Jazz Band, Ray Skjelbred - Summer Session, 1969, LP - ASP Records
- The Great Excelsior Jazz Band, Hot Jazz From the Territories, 1976, Voyager Records
- The Great Excelsior Jazz Band, Roast Chestnuts, 1979, Voyager Records, LP
- The Great Excelsior Jazz Band: Remembering Joe, 1981, Vogager Records, LP

== Members ==
Over a 50-year run, many players joined and left the Great Excelsior Jazz Band. After Ed Alsman left, Howard Gilbert played drums. Joe Loughmiller was the drummer from 1967 to 1981. In 1970 Ray Skjelbred moved to San Francisco, with Bob Gilman taking his place on piano. When Bob Jackson did his conscientious objector alternative service. Jim Goodwin filled in on trumpet. Ken Wiley was the trombonist for several years. Hamilton Carson played saxophone beginning in the late 1970s and was with them for 10 years. Pete Leinonen sat in when Mike Duffy had conflicting gigs. Skip McDaniel played bass, and appears on the LP Great Excelsior Jazz Band Roast Chestnuts. Jake Powel played guitar. Bob West sat in occasionally in the 1960s.
