= Adam Hall (baseball) =

Canadian-Bermudan baseball player (born 1999)

Winnipeg Goldeyes
- Shortstop / Second baseman / Left fielder
- Born: May 22, 1999 (age 27); Hamilton, Bermuda
- Bats: Right Throws: Right
- Stats at Baseball Reference

Adam Hall (born May 22, 1999) is a Canadian and Bermudan professional baseball shortstop, second baseman, and left fielder for the Winnipeg Goldeyes of the American Association of Professional Baseball.

Hall has played baseball since he was a child. Although there were limited opportunities for high-quality play on the island of Bermuda, where he was born and raised, coaches at a Canadian baseball day camp saw potential in him. Hall ended up moving to Canada to play in baseball youth leagues, and he had much success despite playing competition that was as much as four years older. At 15, he joined the Canadian junior national baseball team.

Ahead of the 2017 Major League Baseball draft, Hall was the top Canadian prospect. He was drafted by the Baltimore Orioles and spent six years in the organization's minor league system. After a brief sojourn in baseball's independent leagues, he joined the Milwaukee Brewers organization in 2025. At the end of that season he entered free agency.

== Early life ==
Hall was born to Helen (née Outerbridge) and Tyler Hall, who met at the University of Western Ontario. His mother held British Overseas Territories citizenship because she was born in Bermuda, and his father was from Canada. The family moved to Bermuda before Adam was born. Tyler worked as a physical education teacher and was instrumental in encouraging his child to pursue baseball; Helen also became a teacher.

As a child, Hall played baseball, basketball, volleyball, rugby, soccer, and ran track and field. He ended up taking a strong interest in baseball, and at the age of ten he dropped other sports to concentrate on it. His decision came despite baseball's relative unpopularity in Bermuda; when Hall was growing up, opportunities for high-quality play were rare especially once a child reached the age of 12. He enrolled in a Bermudian youth league to be able to play competitively more often, but Hall later described it as having "three or four teams" that would only play up to a dozen games per year. Hall's parents encouraged his interest in baseball through the installation of a batting cage in their backyard.

Hall began his Canadian youth baseball journey when he and his family were on a trip to London, Ontario to visit his grandmother. He later recalled that he was sent to a baseball day camp in lieu of going Christmas shopping with his parents, something that the teenage Hall was not interested in. The camp's coaches quickly came to believe that Hall had the potential to grow into a talented player after watching him generate high torque when swinging a baseball bat.

At the age of twelve, Hall's parents sent him to Canada on a full-time basis so he could further develop as a baseball player. After the move, he was looked after by relatives and one of his baseball coaches. His parents joined him during their summers off from teaching, and they later moved to Canada permanently.

== Baseball career ==
=== Amateur ===
After moving to Canada, Hall attended secondary school at A. B. Lucas Secondary School in London, Ontario. He also began playing for the London Badgers, a local youth baseball team, and was named their 2012 player of the year.

During Hall's 2013 season with the Badgers, a local newspaper noted that as of August the 14-year-old was having a stellar season: a batting average of .477, a .757 slugging percentage, 27 stolen bases in 28 attempts, and a highlight home run that cleared a 320-foot (98 m) fence. These numbers came despite playing against competition that was as much as four years older than him. Later that year, the Toronto Blue Jays of Major League Baseball (MLB) invited Hall to Tournament 12, an annual teenage baseball showcase of Canadian players. He also showed enough talent to play for the competitive Great Lake Canadians' regional 18U team, which allowed teenagers up to the age of 18. By 15, Hall had joined the Canadian junior national team. In 2016, he was named the most valuable player of that year's Tournament 12.

=== Baltimore Orioles ===
At the age of 18, Hall was the top Canadian prospect in the 2017 Major League Baseball draft and was expected to be drafted in the early rounds. Although he had committed to attend and play college baseball at Texas A&M, he instead chose to sign with the Baltimore Orioles, who drafted him in the second round (60th overall). He received a US$1.3 million signing bonus, which was above the predicted value for his draft pick.

Although multiple press articles have said that joining the Orioles organization made Hall the first Bermudian-born professional baseball player in the United States, at least one other came before him—B.J. Hubbert, who was born on the island and raised in the US.

Hall made his professional debut with the rookie-level Gulf Coast League Orioles, but played in only two games due to an oblique injury. He spent the 2018 season with the Low-A Aberdeen IronBirds, playing in 62 games and carrying a slash line of .293/.368/.374 with one home run, 24 RBI, and 22 stolen bases. Hall's 2019 season at the Single-A Delmarva Shorebirds came with high expectations that he matched. In the course of 122 appearances, Hall slashed .298/.385/.395 with career-highs in home runs (5), runs batted in (RBI) (45), and stolen bases (33).

Hall did not play in a minor league game in 2020 because of impact of the COVID-19 pandemic. He returned to action in 2021 with Aberdeen, now a High-A affiliate, and batted .248/.335/.337 with three home runs, 27 RBI, and 26 stolen bases. Hall split the 2022 between the rookie-level Florida Complex League Orioles, Double-A Bowie Baysox, and Triple-A Norfolk Tides; in 61 appearances for the three affiliates, he hit .270/.362/.351 with one home run, 18 RBI, and 17 stolen bases.

A shoulder injury severely limited Hall's playing time in 2023; in 11 appearances split between Aberdeen and the FCL Orioles, he went 6-for-38 (.158) with two RBI and two stolen bases. Hall elected free agency following the season on November 6, 2023, ending his stint in the organization.

=== Winnipeg Goldeyes ===
On February 2, 2024, Hall signed with the Winnipeg Goldeyes of the American Association of Professional Baseball. Hall made only six appearances for Winnipeg, going 10-for-19 (.526) with one home run, two RBI, and one stolen base.

=== Milwaukee Brewers ===
Shortly after Winnipeg's season began, Hall had his contract purchased by Major League Baseball's Milwaukee Brewers organization on May 31, 2024. He spent the remainder of the year with the Double-A Biloxi Shuckers, also appearing in one game for the rookie-level Arizona Complex League Brewers; in 53 games for Biloxi, he slashed .262/.377/.279 with 16 RBI and 10 stolen bases.

Hall split the 2025 season between Biloxi and the Triple-A Nashville Sounds, batting a cumulative .232/.321/.305 with one home run, 21 RBI, and 25 stolen bases. He suffered a torn meniscus on a defensive play in the outfield that resulted in him being placed on the 60-day disabled list in August. Hall entered free agency following the season on November 6.

=== Winnipeg Goldeyes (second stint) ===
On March 27, 2026, Hall signed with the Winnipeg Goldeyes of the American Association of Professional Baseball. He missed three May games due to injury. Hall played in a total of 85 games for the Goldeyes that season, hitting .342/.407/.488 and adding 45 stolen bases.

== World Baseball Classic ==
Baseball Canada brought on Hall to be a backup infielder for Canada's national baseball team during the 2026 World Baseball Classic.

== Personal life ==
Hall enjoys playing video games and watching hockey.
