= Robert West =

Robert, Rob, Bob, or Bobby West may refer to:

- Robert West (chemist) (born 1928), American professor of chemistry at the University of Wisconsin–Madison
- Robert West (painter) (died 1770), Irish artist, draughtsman, and teacher
- Robert West (politician) (born 1955), BNP politician and founder of the Christian Council of Britain
- Robert West (boxer) (born 1967), American boxer
- Robert West (American football) (born 1950), American football player
- Robert Lucius West (c. 1774–1850), Irish artist, draughtsman and teacher
- Robert Van Osdell West Jr., American entrepreneur in the oil and gas business
- Robert West (psychologist), professor of health psychology at University College London
- Bob West (born 1956), American actor
- Bob West, character in 1977 British comedy Adventures of a Private Eye
- Rob West, a candidate in the Ontario New Democratic Party candidates, 1987 Ontario provincial election
- Robbie West (born 1969), Australian rules footballer
- Bobby West (boxer), American boxer, opponent of Mark Kaylor in 1983
- Bobby West (musician), pianist/composer on 1972 American album A Possible Projection of the Future / Childhood's End

== See also ==
- Robert Sackville-West, 7th Baron Sackville (born 1958), British baron and publisher
- Bob Schoolley-West (1937–2012), British police officer and philatelist
- Red West (Robert Gene West, 1936–2017), American actor
