= Brian West =

Brian or Bryan West may refer to:

- Brian West (soccer) (born 1978), American soccer player
- Brian West (music producer) (born 1971), Canadian musician, writer, producer, engineer
- Brian West (sports artist) (born 1945), British sports artist
- Bryan West (rugby) (born 1948), English rugby player
- Bryan West (journalist) (born 1987 or 1988), American journalist
