= Paul West =

Paul West may refer to:

- Paul West (playwright) (1871–1918), American playwright, screenwriter, lyricist, newspaper editor, journalist, author, and talent agent.
- Paul West (radio and television writer) (1911-1988), American radio and television writer
- Paul West (writer, born 1930) (1930–2015), British-born American novelist, poet, and essayist
- Paul West (footballer) (born 1970), English footballer
- Paul West (chef), Australian chef and TV presenter known for River Cottage Australia
- Paul West, the main character in a series of novels written by Stephen Clarke

== See also ==
- West (name)
