= Tony West =

Tony West may refer to:

- Tony West (attorney) (born 1965), American attorney
- Tony West (darts player) (born 1972), English darts player
- Tony West (footballer) (born 1956), former Australian rules footballer
- Tony West, a character in the 2023 film The Exorcist: Believer

== See also ==
- Anthony West (disambiguation)
