= Hazelden Betty Ford Foundation =

American addiction treatment organization

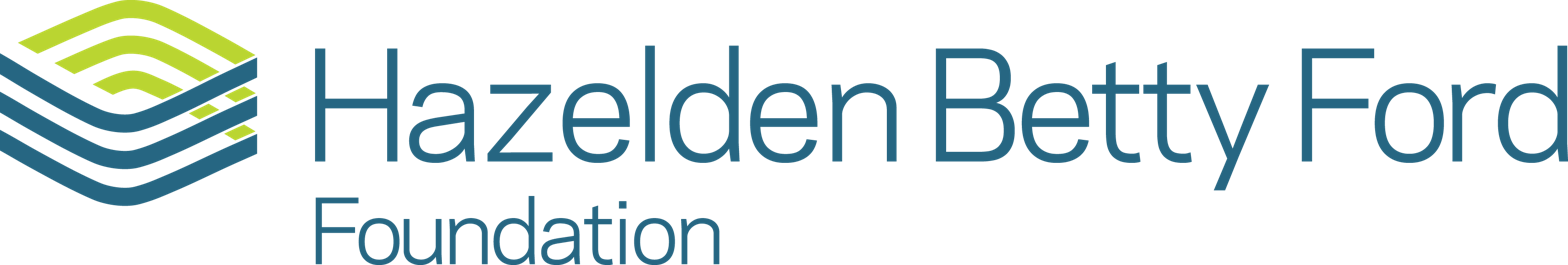
- Founded: 2014
- Locations: Center City, Minnesota; 17 in nine states
- Origins: Merger of the Hazelden Foundation and the Betty Ford Center
- Services: Addiction recovery
- Key people: Joseph Lee, MD (President and CEO)
- Website: www.hazeldenbettyford.org

The Hazelden Betty Ford Foundation is an addiction treatment and advocacy organization that was created in 2014 with the merger of the Minnesota-based Hazelden Foundation and the Betty Ford Center in Rancho Mirage, California, in the United States.

The two organizations have a long history together. Hazelden was founded in 1949, and Betty Ford visited its Minnesota headquarters in 1982 when she was planning to open the facility in Rancho Mirage. The Foundation also includes the nation's largest addiction and recovery publishing house, a fully accredited graduate school of addiction studies, an addiction research center, prevention training, an education arm for medical professionals, family members, and other loved ones, and a children's program. On February 10, 2014, it merged with the Betty Ford Center to form the Hazelden Betty Ford Foundation headquartered in Minnesota.

== The Hazelden Foundation ==
The Hazelden Foundation was an American nonprofit organization based in Center City, Minnesota which operates alcohol and drug treatment facilities in Minnesota, Oregon, Illinois, Florida, Washington, and New York. After the merger it continues to offer assessment and primary residential addiction treatment for adults and youth, including extended care and intermediate care, as well as outpatient treatment, aftercare services and a family program.

=== Hazelden Foundation history ===
Hazelden began in 1949 as a simple farmhouse retreat called the Old Lodge and served only male alcoholics. The farmhouse was purchased from a woman named Hazel, and given the nickname "Hazel's Den".

The original program designed by Lynne Carroll was based on Alcoholics Anonymous principles, especially the Twelve Steps. In the first 18 months, 156 men were helped. In 1953, the Fellowship Club was established as a halfway house to provide additional help for patients after attending the Center City program. The Dellwood site was later moved to the Center City campus. Dan Anderson was vice president of Hazelden from 1961 and president between 1971 and 1986. Mark G. Mishek was named Hazelden President and CEO in August 2008, succeeding Ellen Breyer. Mishek came to Hazelden from Allina Hospitals & Clinics, where he had been President of United Hospital of St. Paul. In 1999, the Hazelden Graduate School of Addiction Studies opened in Center City, Minnesota.

== The Betty Ford Center ==
The Betty Ford Center was an independent nonprofit residential treatment center in Rancho Mirage, California for people with substance dependence. Since becoming part of the Hazelden Foundation it offers inpatient, outpatient, and residential day treatment for alcohol and other drug addictions, as well as prevention and education programs for family and children.

=== Betty Ford Center history ===
The center was co-founded by former First Lady Betty Ford, Leonard Firestone and Dr. James West in 1982. West also served as the Betty Ford Center's first medical director from 1982 to 1989. He left that position to become the Betty Ford Center's director of outpatient services. Ford's decision to undertake such a project followed on the heels of her own battle with alcohol dependence and diazepam addiction after the Fords left the White House, and her release from the Long Beach Naval Hospital. In 2015, after merging with the Hazelden Foundation, the Betty Ford Center opened an outpatient addiction treatment clinic in West Los Angeles.

== Notable people ==
- Bob Packwood
- Matthew Perry
- Robin Williams
