= Dan Anderson (psychologist) =

American psychologist (1921–2003)

Dan Anderson (March 30, 1921 – February 19, 2003) was an American clinical psychologist and educator. He served as the president and director of the Hazelden Foundation in Center City, Minnesota. He is most associated with the development of the Minnesota Model, the clinical method of addiction treatment, based in part on the twelve-step program of Alcoholics Anonymous.

== Biography ==
Anderson was born in Minneapolis and studied at the College of St. Thomas, where he received a B.A. degree in 1950. Starting in 1952 he worked at Willmar State Hospital. After having graduated in 1956 as a M.A. in Clinical psychology from Chicago's Loyola University, he began consulting and lecturing at Hazelden in 1957.

In 1961, he left Willmar and became vice president of Hazelden. In 1966 he received the Ph.D. degree from the University of Ottawa. In 1971, he advanced to president of Hazelden, a position he held until his retirement in 1986. He also taught for many years at the Rutgers University Summer School of Alcohol Studies and lectured frequently at the University of Minnesota Chemical Dependency Counselor Certificate Program.

== Honors ==
- Honorary Doctor of Science degree from the University of Minnesota (1987)
- Distinguished Alumni Award from the University of St. Thomas (2000)

== Selected works ==
- The Origins of the Minnesota Model of Addiction Treatment–A First Person Account (Journal of Addictive Diseases. Volume 18, Issue 1, 1999) Daniel J. Anderson PhD with John P. McGovern MD and Robert L. Dupont MD

== Other sources ==
- McElrath, Damian (1998) Dan Anderson: A Biography (Hazelden's Pioneers Series, Hazelden Foundation) ISBN 9781568383101
