= Furry Lewis =

American blues musician (died 1981)

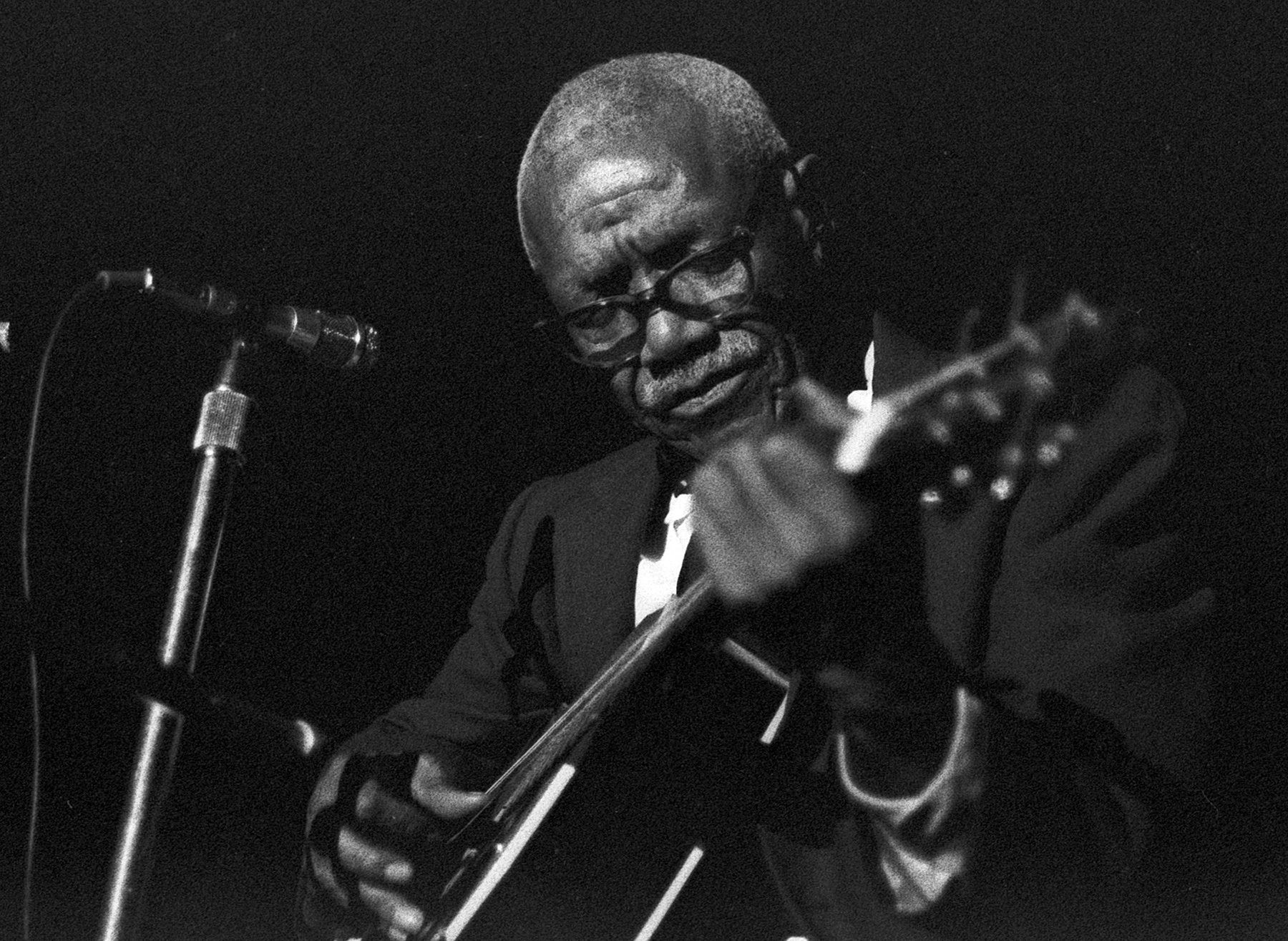
- Lewis at the Wisconsin Delta Blues Festival in 1970

Background information
- Born: Walter E. Lewis; March 6, 1893 or 1899; Greenwood, Mississippi, U.S.
- Died: September 14, 1981 (aged 82 or 88) Memphis, Tennessee, U.S.
- Genres: Delta blues; country blues
- Occupation: Musician
- Instruments: Guitar; vocals
- Years active: Late 1920s–1970s
- Labels: Vocalion; Victor; Barclay; Lucky Seven; Universal

Walter E. "Furry" Lewis (March 6, 1893 or 1899 – September 14, 1981) was an American country blues guitarist and songwriter from Memphis, Tennessee. He was one of the earliest of the blues musicians active in the 1920s to be brought out of retirement and given new opportunities to record during the folk blues revival of the 1960s.

== Life and career ==
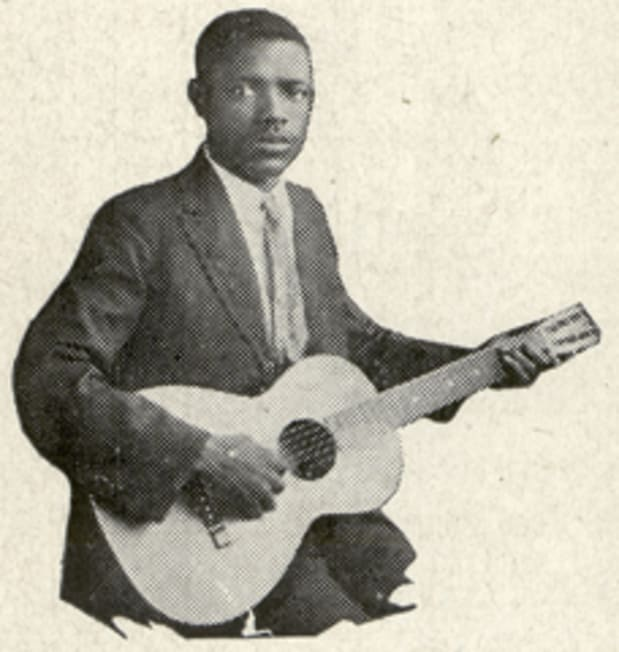
Lewis, c. 1927

Lewis was born in Greenwood, Mississippi. His birth year is uncertain. Many sources give 1893, the date he gave in his later years, but researchers Bob Eagle and Eric LeBlanc suggest 1899, based on his 1900 census entry, and other sources suggest 1895 or 1898. His family moved to Memphis when he was seven. He acquired the nickname Furry from childhood playmates. By 1908, he was playing solo at parties, in taverns, and on the street. He was also invited to play several dates with W. C. Handy's Orchestra.

In his travels as a musician, he was exposed to a wide variety of performers, including Bessie Smith, Blind Lemon Jefferson, and Alger "Texas" Alexander. In 1916, (Note: AllMusic gives the year of the accident as 1917.) Lewis lost a leg in an accident when trying to jump a freight train in the area around Du Quoin, Illinois, despite having enough cash to pay for a rail ticket. He spent a month in hospital at Carbondale, Illinois, recovering, although it took him a year to adjust to his artificial leg and in the meantime he gave up his traveling lifestyle and returned to Memphis, where he performed on street corners. In 1922 he took a permanent position as a street sweeper for the city of Memphis, a job he held until his retirement in 1966, which allowed him to continue performing music in Memphis.

Lewis made his first recordings for Vocalion Records in Chicago in 1927. A year later, he recorded for Victor Records at the Memphis Auditorium in a session with the Memphis Jug Band, Jim Jackson, Frank Stokes, and others. He again recorded for Vocalion in Memphis in 1929. The tracks were mostly blues but included two-part versions of "Casey Jones" and "John Henry". He sometimes fingerpicked and sometimes played with a slide. He made many successful records in the late 1920s, including "Kassie Jones", "Billy Lyons & Stack-O-Lee" and "Judge Harsh Blues" (later called "Good Morning Judge").

On October 3, 1959, Sam Charters, with the assistance of his wife Ann Charters, recorded Furry in his rented room in Memphis, Tennessee. The recordings were released on a Folkways Records LP that same year. On April 3, 1961, Charters again recorded two albums of Furry Lewis - this time at the Sun Studio in Memphis, Tennessee, for the Prestige / Bluesville imprint: "Back on my Feet Again" (BV 1036), and "Done Changed my Mind" (BV 1037). One track was included in Sam and Ann Charters' movie The Blues, finished in 1962, and finding wide release, after being lost for many years, in a 2020 package titled Searching for Secret Heroes by Document Records, thanks to producer Gary Atkinson.

In July 1968, Bob West recorded Furry Lewis along with Bukka White in Lewis's Memphis apartment. In 1972, West, with Bob Graf, in Seattle, released the recording on a 12-inch vinyl record. In 2001 the recording was released on CD as Furry Lewis, Bukka White & Friends, Party! at Home, by Arcola Records.

In 1969, the record producer Terry Manning recorded Lewis in his Fourth Street apartment in Memphis, near Beale Street. These recordings were released in Europe at the time by Barclay Records and again in the early 1990s by Lucky Seven Records in the United States and in 2006 by Universal Records.

In 1972, he was the featured performer in the Memphis Blues Caravan, which included Bukka White, Sleepy John Estes, Clarence Nelson, Hammie Nixon, Memphis Piano Red, Sam Chatmon, and Mose Vinson.

He opened twice for the Rolling Stones, performed on The Tonight Show Starring Johnny Carson, had a part in a Burt Reynolds movie (W.W. and the Dixie Dancekings, 1975), and was profiled in Playboy magazine.

Joni Mitchell's song "Furry Sings the Blues" (on her album Hejira) is about her visit to Lewis's apartment and a mostly ruined Beale Street on February 5, 1976. She wrote "You bring him smoke and drink and he'll play for you, It's mostly muttering now and sideshow spiel, But there was one song he played I could really feel". Lewis expressed his dislike for the song and remarked that she ought to compensate him with royalties for being its subject.

Lewis began to lose his eyesight because of cataracts in his final years. He contracted pneumonia in 1981, which led to his death from heart failure in Memphis on September 14 of that year at the age of 88. He is buried in the Hollywood Cemetery in South Memphis, where his grave bears two headstones. The second, larger headstone, was purchased by fans.

== Discography ==
- 1927-29 - Furry's Blues _The Complete Vintage Recordings (Document Recs, 1990/2003)
- 1959 - Furry Lewis (Folkway Recs, 1959)
- 1961 - Back on My Feet Again (Prestige Bluesville, 1961)
- 1961 - Done Changed My Mind (Prestige Bluesville, 1962)
- 1968 - Presenting the Country Blues (?, ?)
- 1969 - Beale Street Blues/ Forth and Bealt (Barclay/Blue Star, ?)
- 1971 - Live at the Gaslight at the Au Go Go (Ampex, 1971)
- Shake 'Em On Down (compilation), 1972
- The Alabama State Troupers Road Show, 1973
