= George West =

George West may refer to:

- George West, Texas, a city in Live Oak County, Texas, United States
- George Washington West (1851–1926), American cattle rancher and namesake of George West, Texas
- George West (American politician) (1823–1901), industrialist and U.S. Representative from New York
- George West, Viscount Cantelupe (1814–1850), British politician
- George West (footballer) (1889–1976), English footballer
- George West (bishop) (1893–1980), British Anglican missionary and bishop
- George Stephen West (1876–1919), British botanist
- George West (rugby league) (1881–1927), English rugby league footballer
