= Thomas West =

Thomas, Tom, or Tommy West may refer to:

== Nobility ==
- Thomas West, 1st Baron West (1365–1405)
- Thomas West, 2nd Baron West (1391/2–1416)
- Thomas West, 8th Baron De La Warr (c. 1457–1525), courtier and military commander
- Thomas West, 9th Baron De La Warr (c. 1475–1554)
- Thomas West, 2nd Baron De La Warr (c. 1556–1602), member of parliament (MP) for Aylesbury, member of Elizabeth I's Privy Council
- Thomas West, 3rd Baron De La Warr (1577–1618), Englishman after whom Delaware was named, MP for Lymington

== Politics and law ==
- Thomas West (MP died 1622), English politician; MP for Chichester, Mitchell and Hampshire
- Thomas West (Australian politician) (1830–1896), New South Wales politician
- Thomas West (captain), a planter, military officer and politician in colonial Virginia
- Thomas F. West (1874–1931), American lawyer; chief justice of the Florida Supreme Court
- Thomas G. West (born 1945), American professor of politics
- Thomas West (American politician) (born 1964), American politician in the Ohio House of Representatives
- Tom West (Kansas politician) (1925–1975), American politician in the Kansas state legislature
- Thomas West (Vermont politician), American politician in the Vermont state legislature
- T. C. West (1868–1936), American lawyer and member of the California State Senate
- Thomas West (burgess) (c. 1704–1743), Virginia planter and member of the House of Burgesses

== Sports ==
- Tommy West (baseball), American baseball manager (active 1937–46) in 1942 St. Louis Cardinals season
- Tommy West (American football) (born 1954), American football coach
- Tom West (rugby union) (born 1996), English rugby union player

== Others ==
- Thomas West (priest) (1720–1779), Scottish priest, author, and antiquarian
- Thomas James West (1855–1916), English-born theatre entrepreneur
- Thomas Summers West (1927–2010), British chemist
- Tom West (1939–2011), American technologist and protagonist of the Pulitzer–winning non-fiction book The Soul of a New Machine
- Tommy West (producer) (1942–2021), American music executive
- W. Thomas West (born 1943), U.S. Air Force general
- Thomas Wade West (died 1799), English-born American actor and theatre manager
- J. T. Tom West, Nigerian actor
