= Allen West =

Allen West may refer to:

- Allen West (musician) (born 1967), American guitarist
- Allen West (politician) (born 1961), American military officer and politician
- Allen West (prisoner) (1929–1978), American convicted criminal
- Allen West (tennis) (1872–1952), American Olympic tennis player

== See also ==
- Al West (alias Sonny Boy; 1929–1950), lightweight professional boxer
- Alan West (disambiguation)
- Allen–West House, Barrington, Rhode Island
- Allen Weston, pen name of American author Andre Norton (1912–2005)
- Allens West railway station
