= Benjamin West (disambiguation) =

Benjamin West (1738–1820) was an Anglo-American painter.

Benjamin or Ben West may also refer to:

- Benjamin West (New Hampshire lawyer) (1746–1817), American lawyer
- Benjamin West (astronomer) (1730–1813), American astronomer
- Ben West (1911–1974), American politician
- Ben West Jr. (1941–2019), American politician
- Benjamin West Clinedinst (1859–1931), American painter
