= Day camp =

Recreational program for children

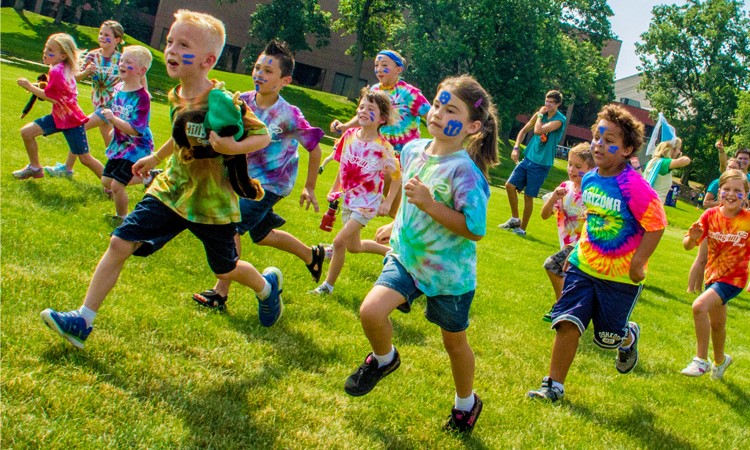
Attendees at SpringHill Day Camp which is located across Michigan, Indiana, Ohio, Illinois, Wisconsin, Iowa, and Kentucky

Day camps, also known as summer camps in some areas, are recreational programs designed to provide children with a fun and enriching experience during the summer or school breaks. Unlike residential or overnight camps, day camps operate during daytime hours, allowing children to participate in various activities and return home each evening. These camps offer a wide range of supervised activities, encouraging socialization, learning, and personal growth in a safe and supportive environment. Day camps can be booked by the day or by the week, or month depending on the institution organizing them. Programs are typically available for kids ages 3–17, but the specific age range can vary depending on the camp's focus and structure. The most popular ages for summer day camps are typically ages 5–10.

== History and Development ==
The concept of day camps for kids emerged in the late 19th and early 20th century when educators and community leaders recognized the need to provide children with productive activities during their time away from school. The goal was to create a structured program that combined play, learning, and socialization to ensure children's overall development and well-being. The Gunnery Camp, founded in 1861, is considered to be the first organized American camp.

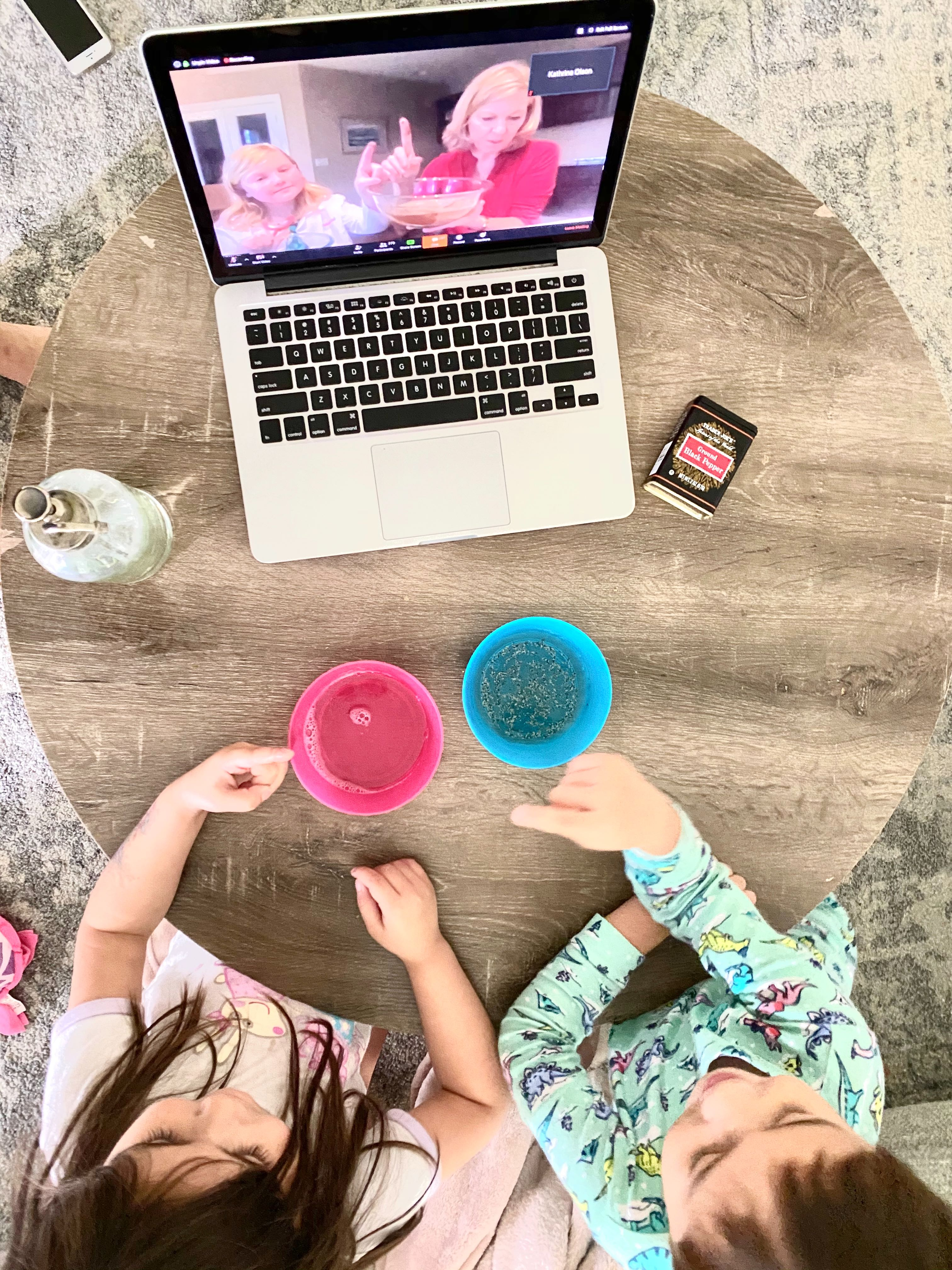
Children learn about germs during a virtual Little Medical School class, hosted by ActivityHero for free during 2020.

Over the years, day camps have evolved to meet the changing needs and interests of children and families. During COVID-19 school and day camp closures in 2020, online camps filled a gap for many families seeking enrichment for their children at home.

Today, day camps offer opportunities for exploration and skill development in a wide variety of subjects. Families also use day camps during school holidays as an alternative to daycare or hiring a nanny.

== Ages ==
Day camps typically cater to a wide range of age groups, and the specific age range can vary depending on the camp's focus and structure. Here are some common categories for age groups in summer camps:

1. Preschool or Early Childhood Camps: These camps are designed for young children between the ages of 3 and 5 years old. The activities in these camps are age-appropriate and focus on introducing social skills, basic learning concepts, and fun recreational activities suitable for preschoolers.
2. Elementary School Camps: Summer camps for elementary school-age children are generally for kids aged 6 to 11 years old. These camps offer a mix of recreational activities, arts and crafts, sports, and possibly some educational elements to keep the children engaged and entertained during the summer break.
3. Middle School Camps: Middle school camps are targeted at preteens and early teenagers, usually ranging from ages 12 to 14 years old. These camps may offer more specialized activities, such as adventure sports, leadership programs, technology-related projects, and team-building exercises.
4. High School Camps: For teenagers, ages 15 to 18 years old, high school camps may offer a more focused approach, catering to specific interests or career aspirations. Some high school camps might be centered around academic enrichment, college preparation, sports training, or arts intensives.
5. Multi-Age Camps: Certain summer camps are designed to accommodate a broader age range, with activities and programs tailored to different groups. These multi-age camps might have separate sessions or age-specific activities to ensure that each age group gets appropriate experiences.

It's important for parents or guardians to research and choose a summer camp that aligns with their child's age, interests, and developmental stage to ensure an enjoyable and enriching experience for the participants. Additionally, some camps may have specific age restrictions or requirements, so it's essential to check the camp's guidelines and policies before enrolling.

== Format ==
A day camp's hours of operations vary based on the specific program, typically offering either a half day or full day program. Some day camps offer extended care to accommodate working caregivers with early drop-off and late pick-up. A day camp usually follows a structured schedule where children engage in various activities throughout the day with snack breaks and lunchtime to offer opportunities for socializing and resting.

To ensure safety for all campers many day camps will have a check-in and check-out procedure to ensure children are released to the correct caregiver.

== Activities and Programs ==
Day camps for kids provide a diverse range of activities and programs to cater to different age groups and interests. These activities may include, but are not limited to:

1. Sports and Outdoor Games: Children engage in team sports like soccer, baseball, basketball, and participate in outdoor games that promote physical activity and teamwork.
2. Arts and Crafts: Kids have the opportunity to unleash their creativity through various art projects, such as drawing, painting, sculpting, and crafting.
3. STEM Activities: Some day camps incorporate science, technology, engineering, and mathematics (STEM) projects to enhance critical thinking and problem-solving skills.
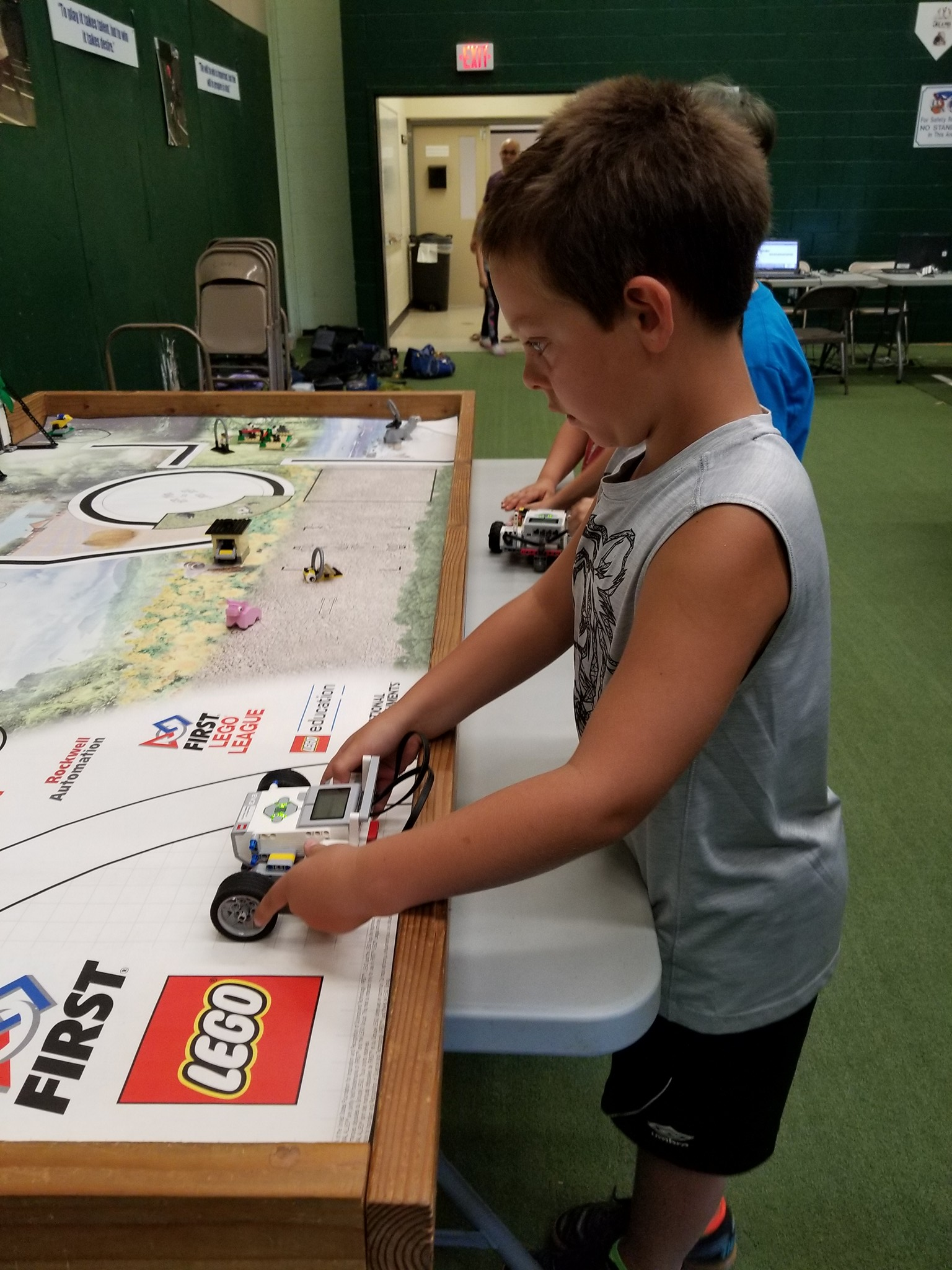
  Child tests a robot built at a hands-on LEGO day camp in Maine.
4. Nature Exploration: Campers may participate in nature walks, hikes, and environmental activities to foster an appreciation for the outdoors and environmental stewardship.
5. Performing Arts: Children interested in drama, music, or dance can enjoy workshops and performances, nurturing their artistic talents.
6. Educational Enrichment: Day camps may include educational components that reinforce learning and prevent summer learning loss.
7. Swimming: Many day camps offer access to swimming pools, providing kids with an opportunity to cool off and improve their swimming abilities. These could range from recreational to competitive swimming camps.
8. Team-Building Activities: Camps often organize team-building exercises and challenges to encourage cooperation and communication among campers.

== Cost ==
The cost of day camps, according to the American Camp Association, day camps that are ACA accredited typically range from $201 to $400 a week, depending on the type of camp that it is. Day camps, which nonprofit organizations sometimes run, are usually the most affordable; they start as low as $100 a week and can range to $500. For-profit camps can cost anywhere from $300-$500 a week. Privately owned or specialized day camps can be a variety of specialty camps that teach the children specific skills. Because of the one-on-one attention that the child gets, prices will be much higher than other day camps. These prices could range from $500 to $1,000 per week.

According to purchase data from ActivityHero.com, a nationwide marketplace for kids' activities, camp prices increased 12.2% in 2023. Camps have experienced significant increases in operation costs, including wages, rent, and materials. To keep camp costs affordable for families, many camp programs are expanding their financial aid programs and offering registration discounts for early enrollment or siblings. ActivityHero has over 2500 need-based scholarships available to offset the rising costs of summer enrichment.

The hourly price of summer day camps is still cost-effective compared with other forms of childcare. The average price paid per hour of camp is $16.64 in 2023, compared to $24 – 27 per hour for a babysitter or nanny in the San Francisco Bay Area in California.

Day camps are also less expensive than sleepaway camps (e.g., summer camps), because they often do not include meals or as much supervised time each day. Some day camps are located at the same site as a resident camp with the same resources and activities to serve local campers, along with kids from abroad. Many day camps are located in city parks, sports complexes, schools, or community centers, such as a YMCA, Boy Scouts, or government organizations.

== Education and Benefits ==
Day camps teach children an abundance of skills that they can utilize. Campers are able to learn independence through day camps because children are going to be responsible for changing themselves, making sure they are aware of where their belongings are, and deciding what they want to eat for the day. Day camps educate children on new skills that they are able to see from the professionals working at the day camps and also from their peers. With the set of new skills that the child has from the day camp, they are also able to gain the courage to try new things.

Child development professionals recognize camps as a whole as places where children can learn how to create relationships with friends that they would be less likely to make in other settings. Day camps teach children how to mature socially, emotionally, intellectually, and physically. Camps give children a sense of community of their own. Day camps educate young people on how to discover their talents, interests, and values more extensively than in other settings, such as school.
