= James West (Scottish footballer) =

Scottish footballer

Personal information
- Full name: James Lockhart West
- Date of birth: 14 June 1891
- Place of birth: Govanhill, Scotland
- Position: Right back

Senior career*
Years	Team	Apps	(Gls)
1913–1921	Queen's Park	14	(0)
- * Club domestic league appearances and goals

James Lockhart West was a Scottish amateur footballer who played as a right back in the Scottish League for Queen's Park. He later became a member of the club's committee.

== Personal life ==
West served in the Highland Light Infantry during the First World War and rose from private to second lieutenant during the course of the war.

== Career statistics ==
Appearances and goals by club, season and competition
Club	Season	League			Scottish Cup		Other		Total	
Club	Season	Division	Apps	Goals	Apps	Goals	Apps	Goals	Apps	Goals
Queen's Park	1912–13	Scottish First Division	2	0	0	0	0	0	2	0
Queen's Park	1913–14	Scottish First Division	3	0	1	0	1 (Note: Appearance in Glasgow Merchants Charity Cup)	0	5	0
Queen's Park	1914–15	Scottish First Division	4	0	—		1 (Note: Appearance in War Fund Shield)	0	5	0
Queen's Park	1920–21	Scottish First Division	5	0	0	0	1	0	6	0
Career total			14	0	1	0	3	0	18	0

== Honours ==
Queen's Park Strollers

- Scottish Amateur League (1): 1911–12
- Scottish Amateur Cup (2): 1911–12, 1919–20
