= Ontario New Democratic Party candidates in the 1987 Ontario provincial election =

The New Democratic Party of Ontario ran a full slate of candidates in the 1987 provincial election, and won 19 out of 130 seats to become the second-largest party in the Ontario legislature. Some of the party's candidates have their own biography pages; information about others may be found here.

== Central Ontario ==
Riding	Candidate's Name	Notes	Residence	Occupation	Votes	%	Rank
Dufferin—Peel	Sandra Crane				4,195		3rd
Hastings—Peterborough	Elmer Buchanan			Teacher	6,579		3rd
Muskoka–Georgian Bay	Dan Waters			Small business owner	7,059		3rd
Northumberland	Judi Armstrong				4,372		3rd
Peterborough	Linda Slavin				10,641		2nd
Simcoe Centre	Frederick Ruemper				7,265		3rd
Simcoe East	Fayne Bullen				9,699		3rd
Simcoe West	Noel St-Laurent				4,788		3rd
Victoria—Haliburton	Ivan Moore				4,251		3rd
York—Mackenzie	Susan Wakeling				6,092		3rd

== Eastern Ontario/Ottawa ==
Riding	Candidate's Name	Notes	Residence	Occupation	Votes	%	Rank
Carleton	Elaine Gibson				4,590		3rd
Carleton East	Joan Gullen				6,105		2nd
Cornwall	Bob Roth				6,756		3rd
Frontenac—Addington	Lars Thompson				4,996		3rd
Kingston and the Islands	John Wilson				6,402		2nd
Lanark—Renfrew	Donald Page				5,486		3rd
Leeds—Grenville	Geraldine Sheedy				4,869		3rd
Nepean	Larry Jones				4,526		3rd
Ottawa Centre	Evelyn Gigantes	Member of Provincial Parliament for Ottawa Centre (1985–1987); Member of Provincial Parliament for Carleton East (1975–1981)		Radio/television broadcaster	11,780		2nd
Ottawa East	Alexander Connelly				4,137		2nd
Ottawa–Rideau	Beatrice Murray				6,000		3rd
Ottawa South	Penina Coopersmith				6,038		3rd
Ottawa West	Paul Weinzweig				4,403		3rd
Prince Edward—Lennox	Paul Johnson		Prince Edward	Lawyer	4,724		3rd
Quinte	Eugene Morosan				3,520		3rd
Renfrew North	Frederick Theilheimer				3,958		3rd
Stormont—Dundas—Glengarry and East Grenville	James Carkner				2,345		4th

== Greater Toronto Area ==
Riding	Candidate's Name	Notes	Residence	Occupation	Votes	%	Rank
Beaches—Woodbine	Frances Lankin				11,948		1st
Brampton North	John Deamer				6,667		3rd
Brampton South	Paul Ledgister				5,786		3rd
Burlington South	Judy Worsley				4,694		3rd
Don Mills	Margery Ward				6,424		3rd
Dovercourt	Ross McClellan				9,727		2nd
Downsview	Maria Augimeri	Member of North York City Council for Ward 5 (1985–1988)			11,658	46.11	2nd
Durham Centre	Sarah Kelly				9,881		2nd
Durham East	Marg Wilbur				6,805		3rd
Durham West	Jim Wiseman		Ajax	Teacher	5,779		3rd
Durham—York	Donna Kelly				5,549		3rd
Eglinton	Michael Lee				3,789		3rd
Etobicoke–Humber	Peter Sutherland				4,511		3rd
Etobicoke—Lakeshore	Ruth Grier	Member of Etobicoke City Council for Mimico (1969–1985)			14,821		1st
Etobicoke—Rexdale	Ed Philip		Rexdale	Teacher	13,892		1st
Etobicoke West	Phil Jones				5,784		3rd
Fort York	Joe Pantalone	Member of Toronto City Council for Ward 4 (1980–1997)	Toronto	Legal aid worker	9,456		2nd
Halton Centre	Richard Banigan				4,487		3rd
Halton North	Fern Wolf				5,796		3rd
High Park—Swansea	Elaine Ziemba	ONDP candidate for High Park—Swansea in the 1985 provincial election Candidate for Ward 2 in the 1980 Toronto municipal election	Toronto		8,764	31.43	3rd
Lawrence	Evelyn Murialdo				8,201		2nd
Markham	Anne Swarbrick			Civil servant	4,323		3rd
Mississauga East	Salvatore Manni				4,864		3rd
Mississauga North	John Moszynski				6,153		2nd
Mississauga South	Barry Stevens				4,976		3rd
Mississauga West	Paul Simon				6,280		3rd
Oakville South	Ronald Cooper				3,080		3rd
Oakwood	Tony Grande	Member of Provincial Parliament for Oakwood (1975–1987)	Toronto	Teacher	9,861	42.54	2nd
Oriole	Judy Rebick				4,470		3rd
Oshawa	Michael Breaugh	Member of Provincial Parliament for Oshawa (1975–1990)		Teacher	12,957		1st
Parkdale	Vasco Dos Santos				3,961		2nd
Riverdale	David Reville	Member of Provincial Parliament for Riverdale (1985–1990); Member of Toronto City Council for Ward 7 (1980–1985)			10,321	44.9	1st
Scarborough—Agincourt	David Kho				7,021		2nd
Scarborough Centre	Menno Vorster				8,525		2nd
Scarborough East	Mary Cook				7,048		2nd
Scarborough—Ellesmere	David Warner	Member of Provincial Parliament for Scarborough—Ellesmere (1985–1987 & 1975–1981)		Teacher	11,941		2nd
Scarborough North	Nicholas Summers				4,509		3rd
Scarborough West	Richard Johnston	Member of Provincial Parliament for Scarborough West (1979–1990)		Social worker	13,330		1st
St. Andrew—St. Patrick	Gladys Rothman				5,608		3rd
St. George—St. David	John Campey				5,658		3rd
Willowdale	Batya Hebdon				5,774		3rd
Wilson Heights	Jennifer Paton				6,697		2nd
York Centre	Joseph Licastro				7,692		3rd
York East	Sophia Apostolides				7,056		3rd
York Mills	Steve Shorter				3,195		3rd
York South	Bob Rae	Leader of the Ontario New Democratic Party (1982–1996); Member of Provincial Parliament for York South (1982–1996); Member of Parliament for Broadview–Greenwood (1978–1982); Member of Parliament for Broadview (1978–1979)		Lawyer	13,190		1st
Yorkview	Sheila Lambrinos				6,148		2nd

== Hamilton/Niagara ==
Riding	Candidate's Name	Notes	Residence	Occupation	Votes	%	Rank
Hamilton Centre	Brian Hinkley				10,333		2nd
Hamilton East	Robert W. Mackenzie	Member of Provincial Parliament for Hamilton East (1975–1995)		Union leader (United Steelworkers)	16,421		1st
Hamilton Mountain	Brian Charlton	Member of Provincial Parliament for Hamilton Mountain (1977–1995)	Hamilton	Property assessor	14,743		1st
Hamilton West	Richard Allen	Member of Provincial Parliament for Hamilton West (1982–1995)	Dundas	Professor at McMaster University	13,430		1st
Lincoln	Ron Hansen			Engineer	6,207		3rd
Niagara Falls	Margaret Harrington				7,936		2nd
Niagara South	Camilla Gyorffy				4,396		3rd
St. Catharines	Robert West				5,566		2nd
St. Catharines—Brock	Christel Haeck			Librarian	6,514		3rd
Welland–Thorold	Mel Swart	Member of Provincial Parliament for Welland–Thorold (1977–1988); Member of Provincial Parliament for Welland (1975–1977); Mayor of Thorold (1955–1965); Member of Thorold Town Council (1948–1954)			17,490		1st
Wentworth East	Sharon Lehnert				8,676		2nd
Wentworth North	Linda Spencer				6,641		3rd

== Northern Ontario ==
Riding	Candidate's Name	Notes	Residence	Occupation	Votes	%	Rank
Algoma	Bud Wildman	Member of Provincial Parliament for Algoma (1975–1999)	Echo Bay	Teacher	8,562		1st
Algoma—Manitoulin	Ronald Boucher				4,385		2nd
Cochrane North	Len Wood			Mechanic	5,675		2nd
Cochrane South	Gilles Renaud				6,010		3rd
Fort William	Donald Smith				7,861		3rd
Kenora	Doug Miranda				6,845		2nd
Lake Nipigon	Gilles Pouliot	Member of Provincial Parliament for Lake Nipigon (1985–1999); Mayor of Manitouwadge	Manitouwadge	Miner	8,446		1st
Nickel Belt	Floyd Laughren	Member of Provincial Parliament for Nickel Belt (1971–1998)	Sudbury	Professor at Cambrian College	9,849		1st
Nipissing	Sandra Clifford				2,961		3rd
Parry Sound	William Pabst				2,231		3rd
Port Arthur	Christopher Southcott				11,828		2nd
Rainy River	Howard Hampton			Lawyer	5,538		1st
Sault Ste. Marie	Karl Morin-Strom				19,064		1st
Sudbury	Sharon Murdock			Lawyer	9,260		3rd
Sudbury East	Shelley Martel			Insurance professional	15,179		1st
Timiskaming	Ollie Rivard				5,871		2nd

== Southwestern Ontario ==
Riding	Candidate's Name	Notes	Residence	Occupation	Votes	%	Rank
Brant—Haldimand	Tracy Macdonnell				4,992		2nd
Brantford	Jack Tubman	ONDP candidate for Brantford in the 1985 provincial election Candidate for Brantford City Council (Ward 3) in the 1974 Brantford municipal election	Brantford	President of the Canadian Auto Workers Local 397	12,112		2nd
Bruce	Norma Peterson				3,986		3rd
Cambridge	Mike Farnan			Teacher	11,284		1st
Chatham—Kent	Brian Rice				7,623		2nd
Elgin	Gord Campbell				7,674		3rd
Essex–Kent	Pat Hayes	Member of Provincial Parliament for Essex North (1985–1987)		Work safety professional/Union official (CAW)	11,478		2nd
Essex South	Marv Ewing				7,312		2nd
Guelph	Derek Fletcher	Wellington County Public School Board Trustee (1985–1990)	Guelph	Press operator	9,119		2nd
Huron	Paul Klopp	ONDP candidate for Huron–Middlesex in the 1985 provincial election	Bluewater	Farmer	3,841		3rd
Kitchener	Susan Coulter				8,379		2nd
Kitchener—Wilmot	Mike Cooper	ONDP candidate for Kitchener—Wilmot in the 1985 provincial election		Rubber worker	7,503		2nd
Lambton	Grant Reynolds				2,914		3rd
London Centre	Marion Boyd	ONDP candidate for London North in the 1985 provincial election	London		9,266		2nd
London North	Diane Whiteside				7,961		2nd
London South	David Winninger	ONDP candidate for London South in the 1985 provincial election		Lawyer	7,074		3rd
Middlesex	Michael Wyatt				5,720		3rd
Norfolk	Norm Jamison			Metalworker	8,346		2nd
Oxford	Wayne Colbran				6,606		3rd
Perth	Warren Ham				6,080		2nd
Sarnia	Catherine Giles				4,552		3rd
Waterloo North	James Hastings				5,785		3rd
Wellington	Burna Wilton				5,159		3rd
Windsor—Riverside	Dave Cooke	Member of Provincial Parliament for Windsor—Riverside (1977–1997)	Windsor	Social worker	17,162		1st
Windsor—Sandwich	George Dadamo		Windsor	Radio broadcaster	12,535		2nd
Windsor—Walkerville	Donna Champagne				13,415		2nd
