= Ed West =

Ed West may refer to:

- Ed West (American football) (born 1961), American football tight end
- Ed West (fighter) (born 1983), American mixed martial artist
- Ed West (journalist), British journalist

== See also ==
- Edmund West (disambiguation)
- Edward West (disambiguation)
