= Edward Nason West =

American priest, writer and theologian (1909–1990)

Edward Nason West (1909–1990) was an American priest of the Episcopal Church. He ministered for many years at the Cathedral of St. John the Divine in New York City where he was canon sacrist and subdean. He was also a theologian, author, iconographer, and an expert in the design of church furnishings. He was the inspiration for Canon Tallis in Madeleine L'Engle's young adult novels and was her spiritual mentor. He was a graduate of Boston University and the General Theological Seminary of the Episcopal Church. He was an officer of the Order of the British Empire, officer of the Order of Orange-Nassau, chevalier of the Legion of Honor, and a knight commander of the Royal Order of St. Sava.

== Early life and education ==
West was born in Boston and graduated from Boston University in 1931. After graduating from the General Theological Seminary he was ordained a deacon in 1934 and a priest in 1935.

== Ordained ministry ==
West was curate and then rector of Trinity Church in Ossining, New York, from 1934 to 1941 and was then named the sacrist at the Cathedral of St. John the Divine. He became canon sacrist in 1943 and subdean in 1966. As subdean, he was responsible for cathedral life when the dean was absent or, as was often the case, the position was unfilled. He retired in 1981 as canon sacrist.

== Authority on liturgical art ==
West was an authority on liturgical art and designed and painted the iconostasis, or altar screens, of the Serbian Orthodox Cathedral of St. Sava in Manhattan. He also created the official emblem of the worldwide Anglican Communion, designed the coat of arms for the Diocese of Albany, as well as Episcopal rings, stained glass windows, altar frontals, processional crosses, and religious vestments.

In 1989, Walker Publishing Company of New York published his book Outward Signs: The Language of Christian Symbolism.

== Spiritual influence and practice ==
West was a high church Episcopalian attuned to both Anglican and Eastern Orthodox culture and practice. He was an admirer of the writer Fyodor Dostoevsky and was especially fond of, and fashioned his mission akin to the character of, Father Zossima in Brother's Karamazof (a starets, or Christian guru without high political ranking but the go-to person for advice among the people in his community).

== Role in assisting Jewish refugees in World War II ==
West assisted with the resettlement of Jewish refugees in World War II. For his services and those of the Cathedral of St. John as a whole, the cathedral was given two large menorahs by Adolph Ochs, publisher of The New York Times. These stand today before the cathedral's high altar.

== Mentor to writer Madeleine L'Engle ==
West was a spiritual mentor and a literary adviser to the writer Madeleine L'Engle. The two had a long and close relationship, always platonic, which carried with it both a formality and informality at the same time. L'Engle became the cathedral's librarian and her office was adjacent to his, with a door that went from the library to his office. The two also shared a love of dogs and together cared for Irish setters. They both were also mentors to many people who were part of the cathedral community and otherwise.
