= Henry West =

Henry West may refer to:

- Henry F. West (1796–1856), mayor of Indianapolis, Indiana
- Henry Wyndham West (1823–1893), English barrister and Liberal politician
- Henry Litchfield West (1859–1940), journalist and commissioner of the District of Columbia
- Henry Skinner West (1870–1961), principal of Maryland State Normal School, now Towson University
- Henry West (MP for Bedford), MP for Bedford
- Harry West (1917–2004), politician in Northern Ireland
