= William West (antiquary) =

English bookseller and antiquarian

- Born: 23 October 1770; Whaddon, Croydon, Surrey
- Died: 17 November 1854 (aged 84)
- Occupations: Bookseller and antiquarian

William West (23 October 1770 – 17 November 1854) was an English bookseller and antiquarian.

== Biography ==
West was born on 23 October 1770 at Whaddon in the parish of Croydon, Surrey. Being tired of agricultural pursuits, in December 1784, when just fourteen, he set out on foot for London in company with an elder brother. He was apprenticed to Robert Colley, liveryman of the Company of Stationers, and was turned over by him to Thomas Evans, the Paternoster bookseller who beat Goldsmith; a brother of West had been articled to Evans since 1778. Before he was out of his time, West married and had three children. At the age of eighteen he became manager to Evans, upon whose retirement the business was carried on by Evans the younger, with the assistance of West. Young Evans was imprudent and had to leave the country, and West went into business himself. In 1808 he was living in Cork, and published a guide to that city. Here he remained until 1830, when he printed his ‘Recollections.’ He then went to Birmingham, and devoted himself with much industry to the compilation of topographical works. Towards the end of his life he resided in London, and obtained employment as a bookseller's assistant or in literary work. His last years were passed in the Charterhouse, where he died on 17 November 1854.

West came of a long-lived race and had a large family. One daughter married Frederick Calvert, who made the drawings for one of his books. His son Samuel was a portrait-painter. A lithographed portrait of West, at the age of sixty, by his son, is prefixed to the ‘Recollections.’

He wrote: 1. ‘Tavern Anecdotes and Reminiscences of the origin of Signs, Clubs, Coffee Houses, Streets, City Companies, Wards, &c., by one of the Old School,’ London [1825], sm. 8vo (anonymous). 2. ‘Fifty Years' Recollections of an Old Bookseller, consisting of Anecdotes, Characteristic Sketches, and Original Traits and Eccentricities of Authors, Artists, Actors, Books, Booksellers, and of the Periodical Press for the last half-century, and an unlimited Retrospect, including some circumstances relative to the Letters of Junius,’ Cork, 1830, 8vo (portraits and plates); 2nd edit. 1st ser., to which is added some additional sketches of the late Captain Grose, London, 1837, 8vo (the autobiographical portion is alone of any value). 3. ‘The History, Topography, and Directory of Warwickshire, inclusive of some portions of the ancient histories of Rous, Camden, Speed, and Dugdale,’ Birmingham, 1830, 8vo (with etchings and map and Birmingham directory). 4. ‘Picturesque Views and Descriptions of Cities, Towns, Castles, and Mansions, and other Objects of interesting Features in Staffordshire and Shropshire, from Original Drawings taken expressly for this Work by Frederick Calvert,’ Birmingham, 1830–31, 2 vols. 4to. 5. ‘Three Hundred and Fifty Years' Retrospection of an old Bookseller, containing an Account of the Origin and Progress of Printing, &c.,’ Cork, 1835, 8vo (plates, supplementary to No. 2). 6. ‘Description of some of the principal Paintings, Machinery, Models, Apparatus, and other Curiosities at the Leeds Public Exhibition, by W. West and E. Baines, junr.,’ Leeds, 1839, 8vo. 7. ‘The Aldine Magazine of Biography, Bibliography, Criticism, and the Arts,’ vol. i. 1839, London (edited by West, who contributed ‘Letters to my Son at Rome,’ which are full of interesting information relating to contemporary booksellers; the magazine ran from 1 December 1838 to June 1839).
