= James R. West =

James R. West (November 30, 1946 – June 16, 2021) was a professor of music focusing on the trumpet at Louisiana State University School of Music in Baton Rouge, Louisiana from 1978 to 2013. Well known as an educator and active in the International Trumpet Guild, he was a writer for the International Trumpet Guild Journal and was the principal trumpet of the Baton Rouge Symphony Orchestra. He was the Louisiana state chairperson of the National Association of College Wind and Percussion Instructors. He was also a student of Vincent Cichowicz who was a member of the Chicago Symphony Orchestra.
