= Martin West =

Martin West may refer to:

- Martin West (colonial administrator) (1804–1849), British colonial administrator
- Martin West (actor) (1937–2019), American actor
- Martin Litchfield West (1937–2015), classical scholar
- Martin West (writer), Canadian writer
