= Fred West (footballer, born 1905) =

Australian rules footballer, born 1905

Personal information
- Full name: Frederick William West
- Born: 22 February 1905; Birmingham, England
- Died: 13 June 1953 (aged 48); Parkdale, Victoria

Playing career^{1}
Years	Club	Games (Goals)
1928–29	Hawthorn	12 (3)
- ^{1} Playing statistics correct to the end of 1929.

Frederick William West (22 February 1905 – 13 June 1953) was an Australian rules footballer who played with Hawthorn in the Victorian Football League (VFL).
