= Adam West (disambiguation) =

Adam West (1928–2017) was an American actor best known for playing Batman on a popular 1960s television series.

Adam West may also refer to:

- Adam West (Family Guy), a character on Family Guy based on, and voiced by, the actor
- Adam West (band), a hard rock band
- Adam West (soccer) (born 1986), American defender with the Seattle Sounders
