= James West (physician) =

Physician (1914–2012)

- Born: James Ward West; March 29, 1914; Chicago, Illinois U.S.
- Died: July 24, 2012 (aged 98); Palm Desert, California, U.S.
- Education: Loyola University Chicago
- Years active: 1942-1981
- Medical career
- Profession: Surgeon
- Field: Physician
- Institutions: University of Chicago
- Sub-specialties: Organ transplantation Addiction treatment

James Ward West (March 29, 1914 – July 24, 2012) was an American physician, psychiatrist, surgeon, and pioneer in the fields of organ transplantation and addiction treatment. He was part of a team of surgeons who performed the world's first kidney transplant in 1950. West practiced as a surgeon from 1948 to 1981. He then focused on psychiatry during his later career. He co-founded the Betty Ford Center in Rancho Mirage, California, in 1982. West served as the founding medical director of the Betty Ford Center from 1982-89.

== Background and education ==
West was born in Chicago, Illinois, on March 29, 1914. He was the oldest of his parents' four children. West attended a Wisconsin boarding school run by the Jesuits, where, as a high school sophomore, he decided to become a doctor. West graduated from the Stritch School of Medicine at Loyola University Chicago. Another student at Loyola Chicago first gave him amphetamines and he became an alcoholic as an undergraduate student.

== Career ==
West was a member of the surgical team, led by Richard Lawler, who carried out the world's first kidney transplant in 1950 at the Little Company of Mary Hospital in Evergreen Park, Illinois. The surgery was performed on a 44-year-old female patient who suffered from polycystic kidney disease. He practiced surgery from 1942 until 1981.

A recovering alcoholic, West successfully remained sober for 54 years, from the late 1950s until his death in 2012. West carried a sobriety chip in his pocket everyday during all of those years. He gave up surgery after forty years to specialize and study psychiatry, specifically focusing on substance abuse and related issues.

He taught at Rush-Presbyterian-St. Luke's Medical Center, now called the Rush University Medical Center, as an assistant professor. He also taught psychiatry at the University of Chicago. West also founded Haymarket Center, a detox center located in Chicago, in 1975.

West joined with former First Lady of the United States Betty Ford to help launch the Betty Ford Center. The facility opened on October 4, 1982. He served as the Center's first medical director from 1982 until 1989. West mandated that physicians served as full members of the center's treatment teams.

In 1989, West became the director of the Betty Ford Center's outpatient programs. He remained with the Betty Ford Center until 2007, when he retired at 93 years old.

West also contributed a weekly column called "Sober Days" to The Desert Sun, addressing questions about alcoholism and alcohol abuse sent in by newspaper readers. His last column was published on July 26, 2012.

His health began to decline in April 2012. James West died at his home in Palm Desert, California, on July 24, 2012, at the age of 98. His memorial service was held at Sacred Heart Catholic Church in Palm Desert.
