= Charles F. West (aviator) =

American aviator and chairman

Charles F. West (April 24, 1899 – July 14, 1972) was a pioneer aviator and the North Pacific Area Chairman of the Early Birds of Aviation.

== Biography ==
He was born on April 24, 1899. He built a biplane glider and soloed in it in the year 1914.

In 1936 he attempted to rescue Paul Redfern who was lost on an expedition to South America. On one expedition he discovered an Indian tribe that had jerrycans that appeared to be part of Redfern's flight equipment.

He died on July 14, 1972, in Oakland, California.
