= Walter West =

Walter West may refer to:

- Walter West (director) (1885–1958), British film director
- Walter J. West (1917–1984), American football player and coach
- Walter Scott West (1872–1943), American soldier
- Walter West (politician) (1861–1934), Australian politician
- Walter West (wrestler), British competitor at the 1908 Summer Olympics
- W. Richard West Sr. (1912–1996), Southern Cheyenne painter, sculptor, and educator from Oklahoma
- Walter West (comics), an alternate reality version of the superhero The Flash
- Walter T. West (1845–?), American politician in the Oregon House of Representatives
- Joseph Walter West (1860–1933), English artist
- Walter West (?–1984), white supremacist killed by fellow neo-nazis, as depicted in the semi-biographical The Order (2024)

== See also ==
- Wally West (disambiguation)
