= Brian West (sports artist) =

British sports artist (born 1945)

- Website: brianwestart.com

Brian West (born 1945) is a British sports artist born in Sutton-in-Ashfield. He studied at Mansfield College of Art and worked as a production engineer in various fields then was a founder of companies supplying equipment to the National Coal Board before becoming a professional artist. His interest in drawing began at age nine when his crayoned depiction of Wolverhampton Wanderers goalkeeper Bert Williams won first prize in a Daily Express art competition.

== Work ==
West is best known for his paintings of association football, capturing layers of movement, emotion, and concentration. He has portrayed players such as Paul Gascoigne, Stuart Pearce, Ryan Giggs, and Gordon Strachan. Among his notable works is a painting commissioned by Dave Mackay depicting the moment of respect and mutual admiration between Mackay and Brian Clough when Derby County won the Second Division title in 1969. West has also produced artworks for figures including Danny Murphy, Gary Lineker, Sir Bert Millichip, Sir Jack Hayward, and Roy Bentley among others. His montage-style portraits often illustrate key moments from a subject's career.

Sir Alex Ferguson commissioned a painting from West to hang in his snooker room. Ironically, the scene featured Scotland's Lawrie Reilly challenging England's Bert Williams during England's 7-2 victory over Scotland did not deter the Scottish manager because Ferguson claimed that he attended the game with his father as a child.

For many years West was commissioned by the Royal Yachting Association to paint a series of action montages titled 'Sailing For Gold' depicting the sailors of the British Olympic and Paralympic sailing teams.
