= Ted West =

English footballer (1930–2002)

Edward West (4 November 1930 – April 2002) was an English professional footballer who played as a left-back. His clubs included Oldham Athletic, Gillingham, and Doncaster Rovers and he played a total of 215 games in the Football League.

== Early life ==
Born in Parbold, Lancashire, England, West lived in India for part of his youth, and during the Second World War he was evacuated to Wigan. After leaving school he worked in the motor trade while playing amateur football.

== Career ==
West played for Eastbourne United as an amateur before beginning his professional career with Doncaster Rovers, but did not play a first team game. He had an unsuccessful trial with Aldershot, before joining Gillingham in July 1954. Initially a member of the reserve team, he made his Football League debut for the club against Leyton Orient in September 1954. The correspondent for the Sunday Dispatch wrote that West was "fully tested by the forceful Groves but after settling down kept a tight hold on him". In his first season with the club, West played 28 times, but was sent off against Watford in March 1955. In his second season with the club he was a near ever-present, playing 46 times, and the following season he played 26 times, missing a month of action due to injury.

After three seasons and exactly 100 professional games with Gillingham, West left the club and joined Oldham Athletic. He spent four seasons with the club, making 117 Football League appearances. In 1958, Tottenham Hotspur and Norwich City were both reported to be scouting West but ultimately did not sign him.

== Playing style ==
West was slightly built for a full-back but fast and was described in 1956 as having "an almost uncanny anticipatory sense for danger" on the pitch.

== Subsequent life ==
After leaving Doncaster, West emigrated to Australia and played football for a club in Bankstown. He died in April 2002 in Mansfield.
