= Garvin Aparicio =

Bermudian cricketer

Personal information
- Born: 15 August 1970 (age 56); Bermuda
- Batting: Left-handed

Domestic team information
- Years: Team
- 2007/08: Bermuda

Career statistics
Competition	Twenty20
Matches	1
Runs scored	3
Batting average	3.00
100s/50s	–/–
Top score	3
Balls bowled	–
Wickets	–
Bowling average	–
5 wickets in innings	–
10 wickets in match	–
Best bowling	–
Catches/stumpings	–/–
- Source: Cricinfo, 21 February 2012

Garvin Aparicio (born 15 August 1970) is a former Bermudian cricketer. Aparicio is a left-handed batsman. He was born in Bermuda.

Aparicio made a single Twenty20 appearances for Bermuda against Guyana in the 2008 Stanford 20/20. He was dismissed for 3 runs Lennox Cush in Bermuda's total of just 62 all out. Bermuda lost the match by 9 wickets.
