= Samuel West (disambiguation) =

Samuel West (born 1966) is a British actor.

Samuel West or Sam West may also refer to:

- Sam West (1904–1985), baseball player
- Sam Ku West (1907–1930), American steel guitar player
- Samuel H. West (1872–1938), United States federal judge
