= Alan West =

Alan West may refer to:

- Alan West (footballer) (born 1951), English midfielder
- Alan West, Baron West of Spithead (born 1948), British politician and admiral in the Royal Navy
- Alan West, former vocalist of English death metal band Bolt Thrower

== See also ==
- Allen West (disambiguation)
- Allen West (politician)
