= Don West =

Don West may refer to:

- Don West (educator) (1906–1992), American writer, poet, educator and civil-rights activist
- Don West (wrestling) (1963–2022), American pitchman, television personality and professional wrestling broadcaster
- Don West (singer), Australian singer
- Major Don West, a fictional character on the TV series Lost in Space
- Don West, a lawyer in the trial of George Zimmerman in 2013

== See also ==
- Donald West Harward, American philosopher
