= Anthony C. West =

20th century Irish author

- Born: Cathcart Anthony Muir West
- Citizenship: Irish
- Writing career
- Language: English

Cathcart Anthony Muir West (1910–1988), who wrote under the name of Anthony C. West, was an Irish writer of novels, short stories, poems, and essays.

The fifth child in a Protestant family, West was brought up in County Down and County Cavan. He served in the Royal Air Force during World War II. After periods living in the United States, Canada, and England, he married an English woman, Olive, and settled with his family in Anglesey. He died in London in 1988.

== Works ==
- The Native Moment (New York, 1959)
- River's End and other stories (New York, 1959)
- Rebel to Judgment (New York, 1962)
- The Ferret Fancier (New York, 1963)
- As Towns with Fire (London, 1968)
- All the King's Horses and other stories (Dublin, 1981)
