= Fred West (footballer, born 1929) =

Australian rules footballer

Personal information
- Full name: Fred West
- Born: 17 December 1929
- Died: 24 November 2011 (aged 81)
- Original team: Parkside Amateurs
- Height: 183 cm (6 ft 0 in)
- Weight: 84 kg (185 lb)

Playing career^{1}
| Years | Club | Games (Goals) |
| 1950, 1953 | Collingwood | 17 (4) |
- ^{1} Playing statistics correct to the end of 1953.

Fred West (17 December 1929 – 24 November 2011) was an Australian rules footballer who played with Collingwood in the Victorian Football League (VFL). He went to Box Hill in 1954.
