= Mary West =

Mary West may refer to:

- Mae West (1893–1980, born Mary Jane West), American actress, singer, comedian, screenwriter, and playwright
- Mary Allen West (1837–1892), American journalist, editor, educator, philanthropist, superintendent of schools, and temperance worker
- Mary Jo West (born 1948), American former television news anchor, spokeswoman and communications director
- Mary Pratt (painter) (1935–2018, born Mary Frances West), Canadian painter
- Mary West (businesswoman) (born 1945/46), American entrepreneur and philanthropist

== See also ==
- Cheves Perky (1874–1940, born Mary Cheves West Perky), American psychologist
- Jessamyn West (writer) (1902–1984, born Mary Jessamyn West), American author
- Mary Jane West-Eberhard (born 1941), American theoretical biologist
- Mary Stanley, Countess of Derby (1824–1900, née Lady Mary Sackville-West), English grande dame and political hostess
- Mary West Niles (1854–1933), American physician and missionary
