= William E. West Sr. =

American painter

William E. West Sr. (1922–2014) was an American painter. Born in Pittsburgh, Pennsylvania in 1922, West moved to Buffalo, New York in 1927. His art career spanned for about 70 years.

== Life and Family ==
In his early life West was encouraged by his mother to pursue his artistic interests. He was the youngest of seven siblings, born in 1922. A year after his birth he was adopted by his Aunt and later they moved to Buffalo in 1926. He spent the majority of his life living in the East Side of Buffalo.

When he returned from World War II in 1946, he attended art school and worked under many well-known artists including Charles E. Burtchfield and Robert Blair. The schools he attended during his studies were the Albright Art School and after that the Art Institute of Buffalo. He held two jobs as a community organizer and a postal worker in addition to his budding art career. West also had four children and a wife named Geraldine Summers.

== Artwork ==
The subject matter of his art ranged from buildings both demolished and under construction, to a series inspired by the women in his life who were dressmakers. His most notable artworks were his landscapes, which served as tributes to the architectural past of the city of Buffalo. West never considered himself to be a professional artist, stating in an interview that "...art continued to be something I pursued without an ambition to be a commercial artist or wanting to make money off of it. I just wanted to paint."

== Death ==
West died in 2014 of congestive heart failure. Many buildings and an art gallery have his work in their permanent collection, one of which is the Burchfield Penney Art Center.
