= Edmund West =

Edmund West may refer to:

- Edmund A. West (1823–1922), American lawyer and politician
- E. B. West (c.1804–1854), American dentist, medical doctor, and surgeon

== See also ==
- Ed West (disambiguation)
- Edward West (disambiguation)
