= Charlie West (footballer, born 1884) =

Australian rules footballer (1884–1962)

Personal information
- Full name: Charles Wooldridge West
- Born: 19 May 1884; Avenel, Victoria
- Died: 16 February 1962 (aged 77); Benalla, Victoria

Playing career^{1}
Years	Club	Games (Goals)
1903	South Melbourne	3 (0)
- ^{1} Playing statistics correct to the end of 1903.

Charles Wooldridge West (19 May 1884 – 16 February 1962) was an Australian rules footballer who played with South Melbourne in the Victorian Football League (VFL).
