= Bob West (radio host) =

American musician (1942–2016)

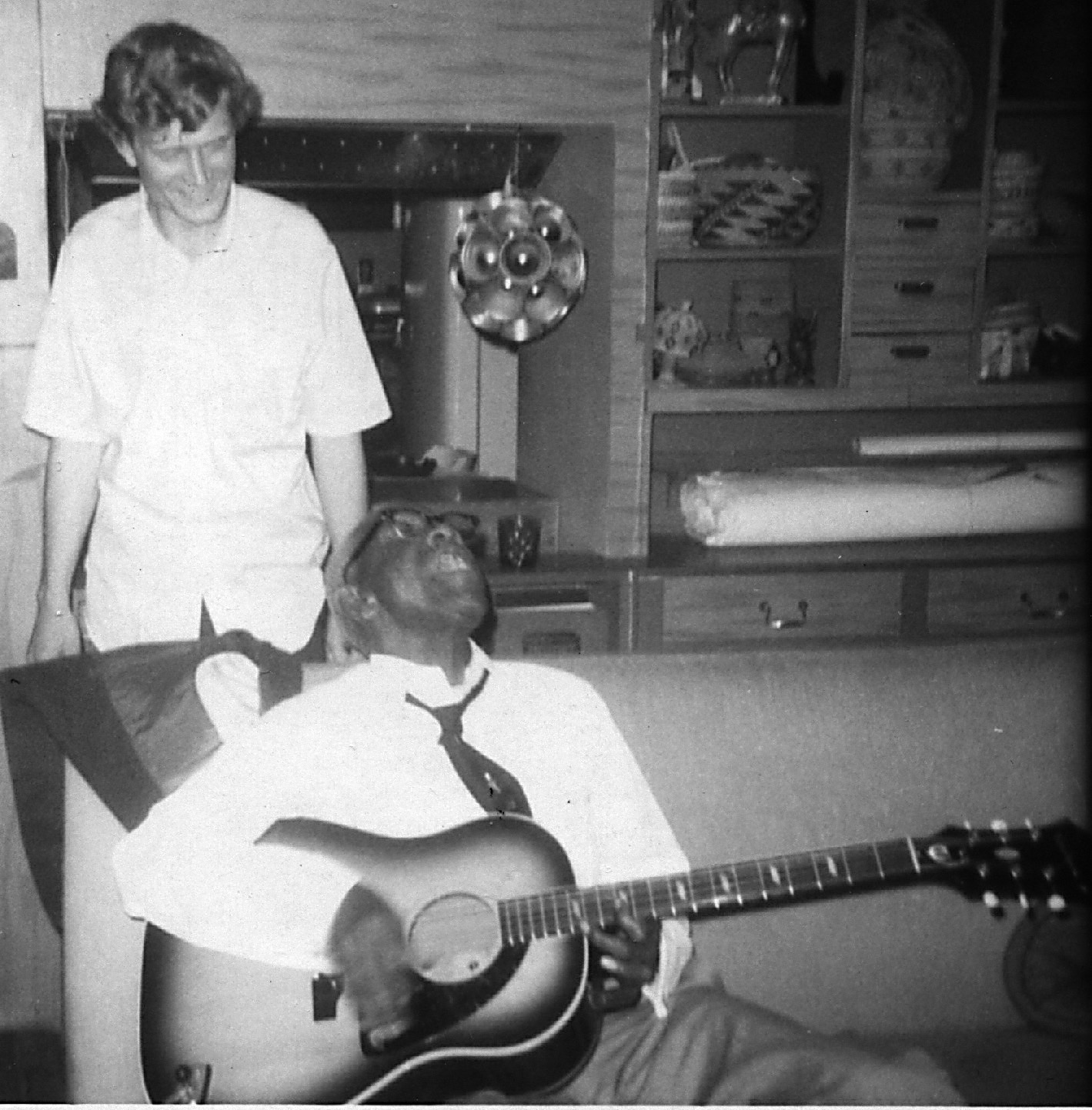
- West with Furry Lewis

Background information
- Born: Jay Robert West; March 27, 1942; Seattle, Washington, United States
- Died: July 31, 2016 (aged 74) Seattle, Washington, United States
- Occupations: ethnomusicologist, record producer, musician, radio host

Bob West (March 27, 1942 – July 31, 2016) was an American ethnomusicologist, radio host, musician, and record producer. He became involved in radio in 1966 at KRAB Radio in Seattle. Lorenzo Milam, who heard him as a guest on another KRAB show, asked him in 1967 to host a weekly jazz and blues show on KRAB. A year later, West made his first field trip to Memphis to record Furry Lewis and Bukka White. In 2001 he founded Arcola Records in Seattle to create and distribute CDs of his field recordings.

== Early life and education ==
West began his interest in jazz and blues at an early age, with his musical interests coming from his father and mother, who collected records. His father, Frank, appreciated blues players, and favored such bands as Billie Holiday, Lester Young, Coleman Hawkins, Fletcher Henderson, and Earl Hines. However, it was his mother, Taimi, who really liked the blues, especially Peetie Wheatstraw. After graduating from high school in Seattle in 1960 West, learning to play the trumpet, and first heard The Great Excelsior Jazz Band, featuring Ray Skjelbred, Bob Jackson, Duffy, Joe Loughmuller, and others. There he met Bob Graf who was a record collector his father knew. Bob Graf became a friend and mentor. West then learned to play piano and guitar and trombone. Later West played trombone with the Great Excelsior Jazz Band.

== KRAB radio and field recordings ==
West was first on the air at KRAB FM in 1966. The next year he had his own show on KRAB, debuting on February 14, 1967. The KRAB program guide announced in 1967 "Rhythm and Blues. Seattle collector Bob West takes over the R&B program with his extensive collection of LPs and 78s." During the first couple of years the program didn't have a consistent name. The typical description in the guide was "Bob West and his giant collection of old scratchies." His first radio interview was Bukka White in the KRAB Studio in December 1967. Bukka had been brought to Seattle by John Ullman and Seattle Folklore Society. The interview was conducted by John Ullman, Mike Duffy, and Bob West. On his show March 16, 1968, West interviewed Son House. Others interviewed included Mississippi Fred McDowell (1969), Big Joe Williams (1970), Mance Lipscomb (1972), Pinetop Perkins (1982) and Barbara Dane (1983). In 1970 he gave the title "King Biscuit Time" to his radio show, naming it after a 1941 radio program heard over KFFA in Helena, Arkansas which had been sponsored by King Biscuit Flour. He hosted King Biscuit Time until 1984 when KRAB went off the air. West made his first field recordings in Memphis in July 1968. He used his own AMPEX 601 reel to reel deck with an RCA 77 microphone that had been provided by Lorenzo Milam. The recordings were made in the house of Furry Lewis. Bukka White also took part in the recordings. West, in 1972, with Bob Graf, issued a 12-inch LP on their own ASP label of Bukka and Furry in Memphis. Over the next sixteen years Bob recorded more field interviews with Robert Pete Williams, Johnny Shines, and others.

== Arcola records ==
The first Arcola Records release, Furry Lewis, Bukka White & Friends, Party at Home (2001), was composed of the field recordings from July 1968. The next two releases were Henry Townsend's The Real St. Louis Blues and Big Al Calhoun's Harmonica Blues, both 2002 from field recordings in St. Louis in 1979. Babe Stovall – The Old Ace: Mississippi Blues And Religious Songs made from field recordings in New Orleans in 1968 was released in 2003. Sunnyland Slim's "Long Tall Daddy with Big Time Sarah", came out of recordings made in Seattle in 1976.

In 2005 Arcola released a two disc CD of Son House. Disc one was a field recording of a March 19, 1968, Seattle concert by Son House, arranged by the Seattle Folklore Society. Disc two began and ended with Son's 1930 song My Black Mama pts one and two. West's interview of Son in 1968 was then interspersed with 1930s recordings by Louise Johnson, Charlie Patton, Willie Brown, Rube Lacey and Robert Johnson.

== Wandesforde dock ==
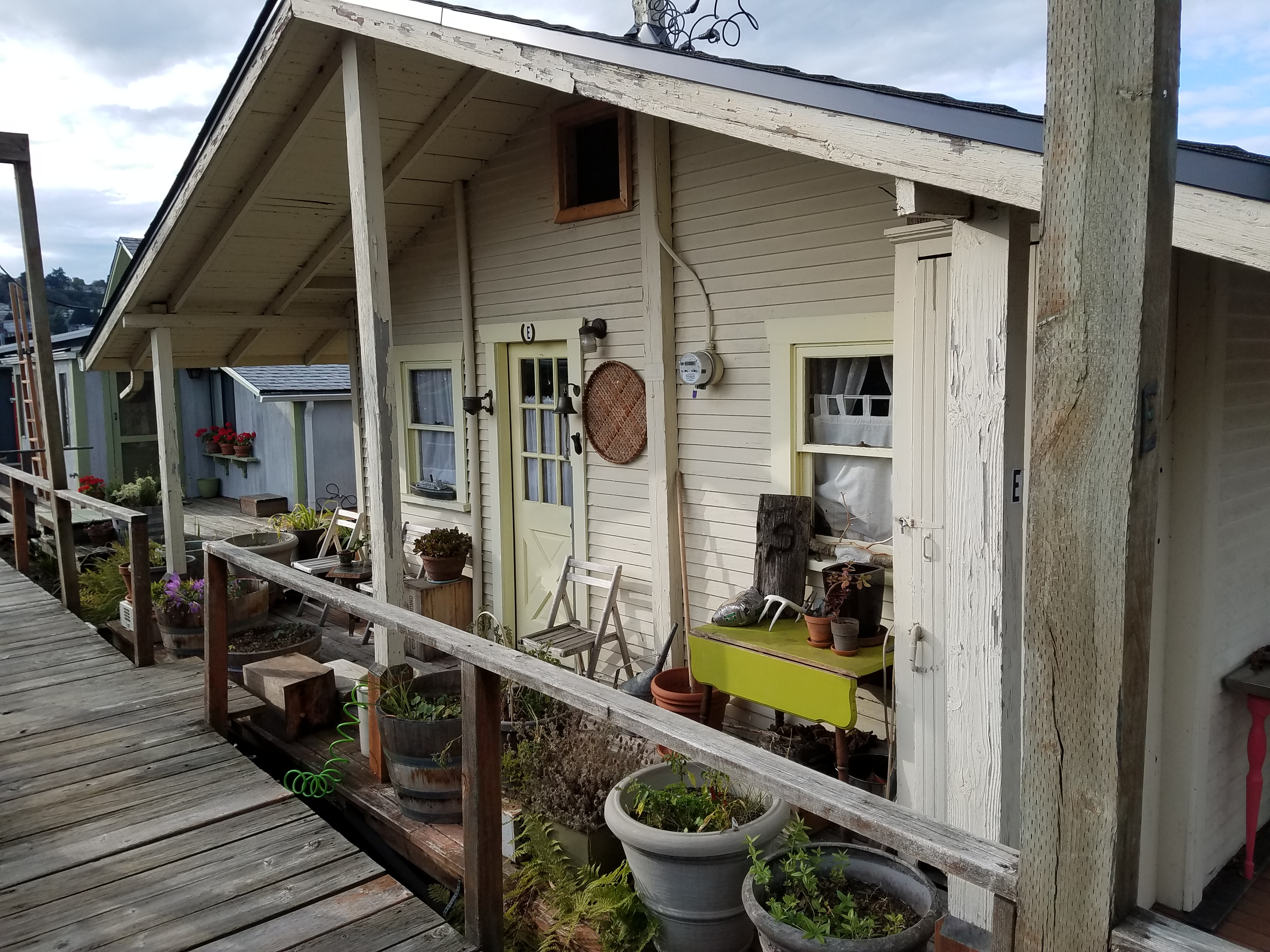
Bob West's houseboat on Wandesford Dock, Lake Union, Seattle

After meeting Ray Skjelbred the first time at the Great Excelsior Jazz Band gig; West was invited to jazz events at Skjelbred's houseboat on the Wandesforde Dock on Fairview Ave. West bought the houseboat from Skjelbred in 1972. West lived there for 47 years. His neighbors on the dock became accustomed to his late night record-listening and jam sessions. Jazz and blues musicians visiting Seattle came to West's houseboat to relax before and after shows. West also give the house to visiting musicians, while West lived with his family. Various people who stayed at the houseboat included Bukka White, Pete Seeger, Son House, Sunnyland Slim, and many others. Every July 4, through to 2015 West held a special party for people who wanted to hear live blues and jazz and see the fireworks go off over Lake Union. For that party, he would cook up a big pot of red beans and rice with other victuals, stock up beer, and then people started arriving in the afternoon, with many staying well after midnight. Entertainment was live music and also projected 16mm jazz films. West also had a wooden rowboat that guests could take out onto Lake Union for a better view of fireworks and other boats.
