= Richard West =

Richard West may refer to:

== Academics and scientists ==
- Richard West (priest) (1670?–1716), English churchman and academic, archdeacon of Berkshire
- Richard C. West (1944–2020), American Tolkien scholar
- Richard Gilbert West (born 1926), British botanist and geologist
- Richard Martin West (born 1941), Danish astronomer
- Richard Temple West (1827–1893), English clergyman and academic
- W. Richard West Sr. (1912–1996), Cheyenne, artist and director of Bacone College's art program
- W. Richard West Jr. (born 1943), Cheyenne, founding Director of the Smithsonian National Museum of the American Indian

== Musicians ==
- Richard West (keyboardist) (born 1967), member of British rock band Threshold
- Mr. C (Richard West, born 1968), British DJ and musician

== Politicians ==
- Richard West (MP for Haslemere) (1636–1674), English landowner and politician
- Richard West (Lord Chancellor of Ireland) (c. 1691–1726), 18th-century Irish politician and lawyer, MP for Grampound, and for Bodmin
- Richard West (Missouri politician), member of the Missouri House of Representatives
- Richard W. West (1932–1936), mayor of Newport News, Virginia

== Sportspeople ==
- Dick West (baseball) (1915–1996), American baseball player
- Richard West (cricketer, born 1916), English cricketer
- Richard West (cricketer, born 1920) (1920–1985), English cricketer
- Richard West (footballer), (born 1985), Jamaican footballer
- Richard West (rugby union) (born 1971), former English rugby union footballer

== Other people ==
- Richard West, 7th Baron De La Warr and 4th Baron West (1430–1475/6)
- Richard West (journalist) (1930–2015), British journalist and author
- Richard West (outlaw) (1860–1898), outlaw of the Old West
- Richard Annesley West (1878–1918), British army officer, Victoria Cross recipient

== Other uses ==
- Richard West Houses, a building in Toronto, Canada
