= Billy West (baseball) =

American baseball player (1853–1928)

- Second baseman
- Born: August 15, 1853; Williamsburg, New York
- Died: October 27, 1928 (aged 75); Richmond Hill, New York
- Batted: Unknown Threw: Unknown

MLB debut
- May 22, 1874, for the Brooklyn Atlantics

Last MLB appearance
- September 9, 1876, for the New York Mutuals

MLB statistics
- Games played: 10
- Runs scored: 4
- Hits: 8
- Batting average: .205
- Stats at Baseball Reference

Teams
- Brooklyn Atlantics (1874); New York Mutuals (1876)

William O. West (August 15, 1853 – October 27, 1928), was a professional baseball player who played second base for the 1874 Brooklyn Atlantics and 1876 New York Mutuals.
