= Peter West (footballer) =

Australian rules footballer

Personal information
- Full name: Peter West
- Born: 3 May 1931
- Died: 20 June 2010 (aged 79)
- Original team: Brim
- Height: 173 cm (5 ft 8 in)
- Weight: 65 kg (143 lb)

Playing career^{1}
Years	Club	Games (Goals)
1952	Geelong	2 (0)
- ^{1} Playing statistics correct to the end of 1952.

Peter West (3 May 1931 – 20 June 2010) was an Australian rules footballer who played with Geelong in the Victorian Football League (VFL).
