= Jim West (cricketer) =

Bermudian cricketer (born 1982)

Personal information
- Full name: James West
- Born: 15 September 1982 (age 44); Bermuda
- Batting: Right-handed
- Bowling: Right-arm medium-fast

International information
- National side: Bermuda

Career statistics
Competition	List A	Twenty20
Matches	3	1
Runs scored	2	1
Batting average	1.00	1.00
100s/50s	0/0	0/0
Top score	2	1
Balls bowled	117	18
Wickets	0	1
Bowling average	–	37.00
5 wickets in innings	–	0
10 wickets in match	–	0
Best bowling	–	1/37
Catches/stumpings	0/–	0/–
- Source: Cricinfo, 20 February 2012

James West (born 15 September 1982) is a Bermudian cricketer. West is a right-handed batsman who bowls right-arm medium-fast. He was born in Bermuda.

West made his debut for Bermuda in a List A match against Namibia at the Wanderers Cricket Ground, Windhoek. He later made his second List A appearance against the touring United Arab Emirates at the National Stadium, Hamilton. Following the match against the United Arab Emirates, West played a single Twenty20 match against the same opposition, taking the wicket of Amjad Javed for the cost of 37 runs from three overs.

He was later a part of Bermuda's squad for the 2011 World Cricket League Division Two in the United Arab Emirates, featuring in a single List A match against Uganda.
