= Corinne Michelle West =

American painter

- Born: 1908; Chicago, Illinois
- Died: 1991 (aged 82–83); New York City
- Known for: Painter
- Movement: Abstract Expressionism
- Website: michaelcorinnewest.com

Corinne Michelle West (1908–1991) was an American painter; she also used the names Mikael and Michael West. She was an Abstract Expressionist.

== Life and career ==
Corinne Michelle West was born in Chicago, Illinois. She attended the Cincinnati Conservatory of Music before moving to the Cincinnati Art Academy in 1925. She graduated from the Cincinnati Art Academy in 1930. West – on June 26, 1930, at the Wesley Chapel in Cincinnati – married theatre actor Randolph Nelson (1909–1978).

West moved to New York in 1932. She began to study painting with Hans Hofmann at the Art Student's League of New York and commercial art at the Traphagen School of Fashion. After graduating and leaving the teachings of Hofmann, in 1934, West began studying under Raphael Soyer. She was Arshile Gorky's muse and probably his lover, although she refused to marry him when he proposed several times. They shared a passion for art and visited museums and galleries together.

West's paintings in the mid-1930s through the mid-1940s were Cubist and Neo-Cubist in style. In 1936 she had her first solo exhibition, at the Rochester Art Club; also in 1936, she had begun to go by Mikael to obtain better opportunities, and after Arshile Gorky told her that the name "Corinne" sounded like that of a "debutante's daughter." Gorky's suggestion however, was based on a real prejudice against women in the art world, such as with George Sand and George Elliot. In 1941 she began to use the name Michael, which she used in her regular life as well as her painting.

She is considered one of the pioneers of Abstract Expressionism, a style commonly associated with Willem de Kooning and the Action Paintings of Jackson Pollock. Inspired by Parisian philosopher Henri Bergson’s theory of “living energy” and the new spirituality to come out of post-war American art, West adopted a style that can be described as Neo-Cubist, using heavy painterly brushstrokes to bring movement to the canvas. In an essay from January 1946, she says, “The new peace has brought about a world of opening facts — and a speed which causes change both of matter and a way of doing things — a different system — the world by the artist is sudden viewed and felt in a new way." In 1946, after returning to New York from Rochester, she exhibited at the Pinacotheca Gallery alongside Mark Rothko and Adolph Gottlieb. West – on June 30, 1948, in Manhattan – married filmmaker Francis Lee; they divorced in 1960.

West was one of the few female members of the New York Art School movement. In creating her work, West was inspired by the existentialist writer Henri Bergson's theory of 'living energy' and was guided by her instinctive creativity and passion. During the 1950s, she was committed to action painting, as shown in works like Space Poetry (1956). She exhibited in Manhattan's prestigious Stable Gallery in 1953, and had a solo show in 1957 at the Uptown Gallery in New York City. In 1958 she had a one-woman show at the Domino Gallery in Georgetown, Washington, D.C.

In the 1960s and 1970s, West held three solo exhibitions at the Granite Gallery, Imaginary Art, and Woman Art Gallery, all in New York. Her style in these years became more experimental, with West exploring collage, calligraphy, and staining techniques.

West also wrote poems; she wrote a series of 50 poems in the 1940s, including the poem The New Art in 1942. Later in 1968 she created a series of poem-paintings related to the Vietnam war.

West died in 1991 in New York. Five years after her death, a retrospective of her work was held at the Pollock-Krasner House. The first major West Coast exhibit of her work was held posthumously at Art Resource Group's Newport Beach, California gallery in 2010.

== Notable works ==
Blinding Light

With Harlequin, (1946), West investigated “art as process” and her expressive abstractions became more aggressive action paintings. She soon destroyed Harlequin by painting over it (leaving some parts still visible) with Blinding Light (1947-48); the overpainting was a deliberate act of destruction, her response to the destructive power of the atomic bomb. Kelly Grovier described Blinding Light as "one of the most daring, uncompromising and innovative paintings to emerge in the [twentieth] century", and said that it is one of the "most intriguing plot points" of American modern art.

This is where West’s Blinding Light looms so powerfully in the story of 20th-Century art – how it succeeds more radically and unflinchingly than more celebrated works created around the same time. Unlike works by her better-known male contemporaries such as Richard Pousette-Dart's Comprehension of the Atom, Crucifixion (1944) or Jackson Pollock’s Shimmering Substance (1946), West’s complex canvas is not content merely to represent symbolically the spiritual implications of nuclear physics... it’s apparent that the artist is not attempting to distill from detonation a lyricism of rhythm or harsh harmonies from explosive chaos. These are actual abrasions. Real violence. There is a brutal authenticity to West’s painting...

— Kelly Grovier, BBC October 2020

== Legacy ==
In 2016 her biography was included in the exhibition catalogue Women of Abstract Expressionism organized by the Denver Art Museum.

In 2023 her work was included in the exhibition Action, Gesture, Paint: Women Artists and Global Abstraction 1940-1970 at the Whitechapel Gallery in London.
