= Griffis =

Griffis or Griffiss is a surname. Notable people with the surname include:

- Elliot Griffis, composer
- William Elliot Griffis, orientalist
- Rhoda Griffis (born 1965), American actress
- Townsend Griffiss, aviator

== See also ==
- 16253 Griffis, asteroid
- Griffiss International Airport, in Rome, New York
- Griffis Sculpture Park, in Cattaraugus County, New York
