= Francis Hall (Japan) =

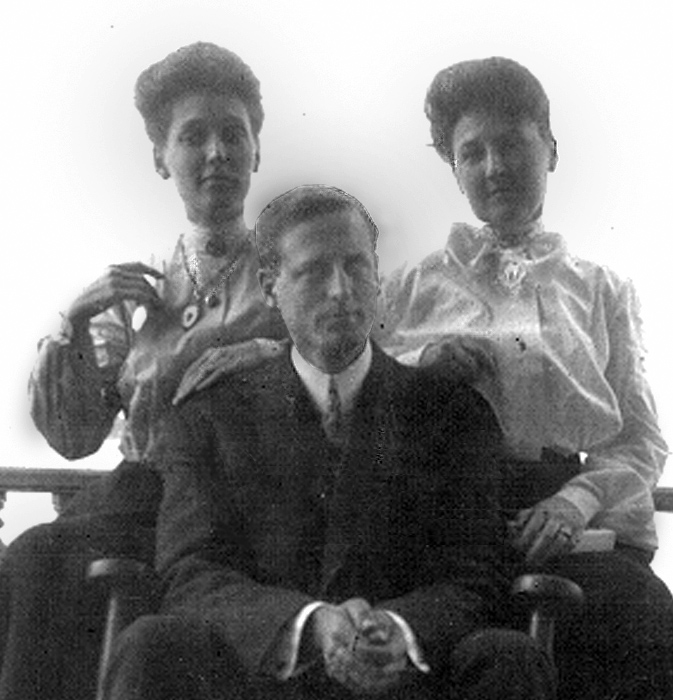
Photograph of Francis Hall with his sisters-in-law after his return from Japan in 1866

Francis Hall (1822–1902) was an upstate New York book dealer who went to Japan in 1859 and became the founder of Walsh, Hall and Co., America's leading trading house in 19th-century Japan. Hall served as Japan correspondent for Horace Greeley's New York Tribune during the final years of the Tokugawa shogunate, publishing nearly 70 articles in the Tribune. While in Japan he kept a detailed journal that has become a major source on life in Japan during the middle of the 19th century. Having made a fortune in trade between Japan and the United States he returned home in 1866 and became a philanthropist and world traveler.

== Early life ==
Francis (Frank) Hall was born the sixth son in a family of sixteen children in Ellington Connecticut on October 27, 1822. His father, John Hall (1783–1847), a Yale graduate (1802), founded one of the nation's premiere preparatory academies, the Ellington School, in 1829. The Ellington School continued until 1839 when the elder Hall retired. But the family's role in education was continued by Frank's older brother, Edward, who established the Hall Family School for Boys in 1844. This was an exclusive school that took no more than twelve students annually. Years later, in 1872, Frank Hall was instrumental in sending Iwasaki Yanosuke, the man who came to head the Mitsubishi Corporation and later the Baron Iwasaki, to his brother's school in Ellington.

Hall graduated from the Ellington School in 1838. The financial panic of 1837 made it impossible for him to attend Yale, so he took up a career of teaching school. By 1842 he had given up teaching and moved to Elmira, New York, where he opened the town's first book store. Hall became a successful book dealer and a cultural figure in the community. In 1846 he married Sarah Covell the daughter of Miles Covell one of Elmira's most prominent citizens. Unfortunately, Sarah died two years later in 1848. Troubled by his wife's death, Hall thought of leaving Elmira, but could find no buyer for his store. For the next decade he busied himself in the life of the community and served for a time as the elected president of the Board of Trustees of Elmira, which was the equivalent of serving as mayor of the city.

== Travel to Japan ==
In 1859, after selling his business to his two brothers Frederic and Charles C., Hall decided to join Samuel Robbins Brown, Guido Verbeck, and Duane B. Simmons, three Dutch Reformed Board missionaries, on a trip to Japan. Hall had worked with Brown in the creation of Elmira College, one of the nation's first female institutions of higher learning. Hall had also been close to Bayard Taylor, America's premier travel writer, who had visited Elmira at Hall's invitation on the Lyceum Circuit. Taylor had gone to Japan with the Perry expedition in 1854 and had covered the expedition for Horace Greeley's Tribune. It seems that Taylor served as an intermediary to Greeley who decided to hire Hall as the Tribune’s Japan correspondent.

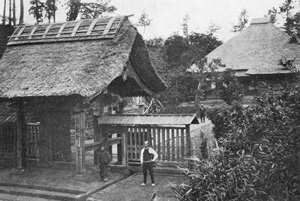
The temple in which Hall resided in Kanagawa. Only known Japan photo made by Hall. Hall lived with J.C. Hepburn and his wife in this temple.

Hall took up residence in Kanagawa on November 1, 1859, among a mere handful of Westerners then residing in the new Treaty Port (Kanagawa-Yokohama). His seven years in Japan covered the most momentous period, during which the old feudal regime gave way to the forces that made the Meiji Restoration. Constantly surrounded by violence and the threat of violence, Hall remained remarkably calm and collected. His journal records the life of the treaty port in great detail. Hall quickly learned Japanese with some of the best students of the age, J.C. Hepburn, the great missionary scholar being one of the men with whom he studied. Consequently, what Hall recorded was not only the daily life of Westerners, but much of the daily life of the Japanese around him. Ethnographer, demographer, sports writer, social observer, economist, agronomist, diplomat, personal participant in momentous events, Hall left a remarkable portrait of Japan and the Japanese in his daily observations. In addition, Hall was interested in photography and a serious student of Japanese plants. He was a friend of George R. Hall, Robert Fortune and Philipp Franz von Siebold—all major "plant hunters." Hall sent some of the first Japanese lilies to the U.S., which were sold at his brothers’ bookstore in Elmira.

Detail from Hiroshige II Print showing Walsh Hall & Co. Garden in Yokohama with George R. Hall's plants about to be sent to the U.S.

In 1862 Hall's business instincts convinced him to bring some of his capital from the United States and to start a new line of enterprise in Japan. That year he joined John Greer and Thomas Walsh to found Walsh, Hall, & Co., a commission trading house that quickly expanded into the tea and silk trade. Under Hall's leadership Walsh, Hall, & Co's business flourished and the company came to be known in Japan as "Ame-ichi," the "No. 1 American firm." Its position ranked with the greatest British houses such as Jardine-Matheson & Co. and Dent & Co. Although Hall terminated his partnership with the Walsh Brothers and returned to the United States in 1866, the firm continued to use the Hall name because of the reputation for integrity he had created. Walsh, Hall, & Co. was active in Japan until 1897 when John Greer Walsh died in Yokohama and the firm's remaining interests were sold to the Mitsubishi Corporation.

== Post-Japan ==
After leaving Japan Hall returned to Elmira and split his time between that city and New York. He continued to pursue his business interests and became the founder, First Vice President and major stockholder in the Syracuse Chilled Plow Co. His real estate holding ranged from New York to Puget Sound. He also became a major philanthropist, supporting Elmira College, the Steele Memorial Library, the Arnot-Ogden Hospital and other charities in Elmira. In 1902 he set out to build the Hall Memorial Library a splendid $40,000 structure in Ellington Connecticut to honor the educational work of his father and brother Edward. When it was completed in 1903, the New York Tribune called it "one of the finest gifts ever made to a Connecticut town."

== Legacy ==
Hall Memorial Library, Ellington, Connecticut

In addition to his philanthropy Hall became a world traveler. At the time of his death on August 26, 1902, the Elmira paper noted in his obituary, that "next to Bayard Taylor, he was the greatest American traveller, Greenland and Iceland being the only two countries he had not visited." Hall's massive journal was not published until 1992, close to a hundred years after his death. Hall amassed an art collection that was sold at auction in New York in 1904. Many of his Japanese antiques were dispersed in the Elmira region. His collection of photographs taken in Japan has yet to be rediscovered.
