= Billie Lawless =

American sculptor (born 1950)

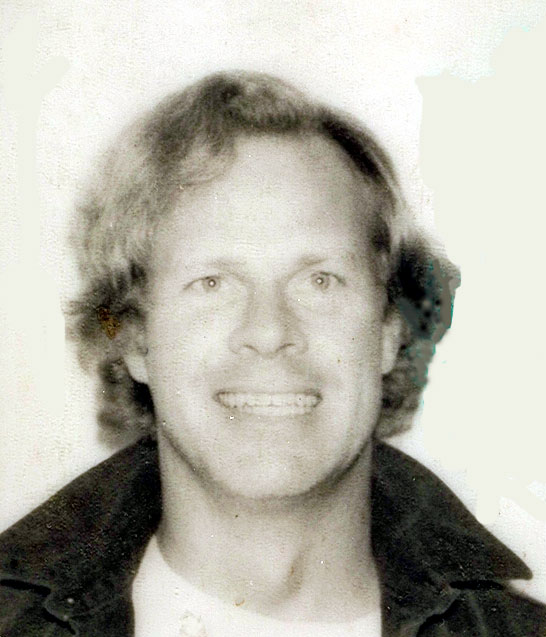
- Billie Lawless
- Born: July 16, 1950 (age 76); Boston, Massachusetts
- Education: Rutgers College, New Brunswick, New Jersey
- Known for: sculpture
- Notable work: Green Lightning,Didy Wah Didy,The Politician: A Toy

Billie Lawless (born July 16, 1950) is an American sculptor.

== Biography ==
Lawless was born in Boston, Massachusetts and grew up in Buffalo, New York. His interest in art was fostered by the presence of the Albright–Knox Art Gallery nearby, and by sculptor Larry Griffis, who was a friend of the family. Lawless was a rower and in 1967 he stroked the first Senior Heavyweight crew to win the American and Canadian Schoolboy National Championships (Canadian Secondary School Rowing Association) in the same year. In his senior year of high school he represented the United States at the World Rowing Championships held in the Netherlands, competing in the straight four. Rowing has remained a constant in his life through college as a coach at the West Side Rowing Club.

He attended Rutgers College, New Brunswick, New Jersey from 1968 to 1970 and from 1972 to 1974 when he graduated with a BFA degree. At Rutgers College Lawless studied with Bob Cook, Livingston College and Melvin Edwards.

Between the years of 1970 and 1972 Lawless actively fought against the war in Vietnam. He was involved in litigation with his local draft board. Board officials arbitrarily removed his student status and made him available to the draft, so he claimed conscientious objector status. Lawless litigated and won a decision in New York State Supreme Court.

After his student status was restored he enrolled at the University of Notre Dame, South Bend, Indiana and studied with Konstantin Milonadis, a Distinguished Professor and Artist-in-Residence at the university. Lawless committed himself to working with steel and the idea of combining it with as many different materials as possible (in particular at that time, stained glass).

From 1980 to 1982 Lawless attended the University at Buffalo, SUNY studying with Duayne Hatchett and George Smith, receiving a MFA degree in June 1982. During this period, though unrelated to his graduate studies, Lawless also built and installed Cock-a-doodle-doo at Buffalo State University. This piece was dedicated in May 1982.

In 1984 Lawless created the sculpture titled Green Lightning which was placed in the Midtown Corridor of Buffalo, New York.

The installation created controversy since part of the imagery employed neon lighting and was visible only after dark.

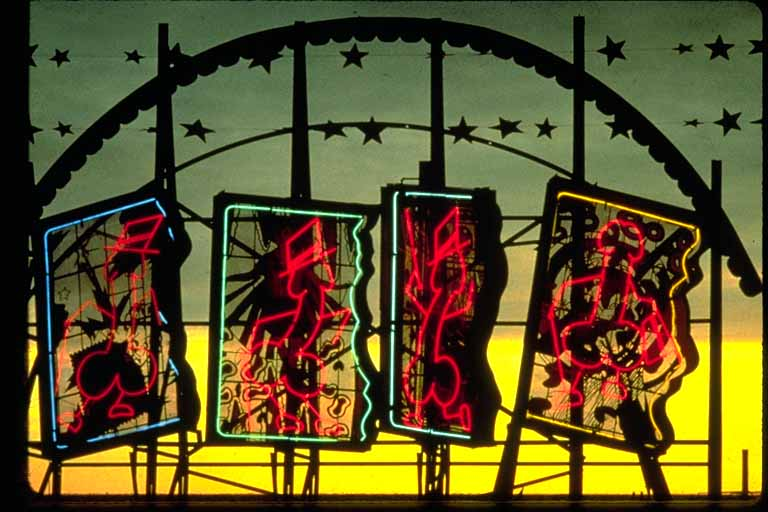
Green Lightning Night

Some City officials found the work to be offensive, and Mayor James D. Griffin ordered it removed on 20 November, 5 days later. The Mayor hired a salvage company to cut it apart at night, but before the demolition was complete, Supreme Court Justice Vincent Doyle issued an injunction halting the demolition.

In 1994 Lawless married Svetlana Schreiber, an immigration attorney, in Cleveland, Ohio and originally of Sighetu Marmației, Romania. He has two stepsons who reside in New York City.

== Works ==
=== Green Lightning ===
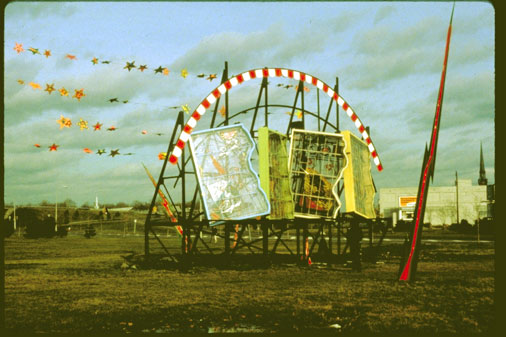
Green Lightning

Green Lightning was originally conceived as a project at Artpark, Lewiston, New York for the 1983 season. It was subsequently erected in Buffalo, New York in 1984 and heavily damaged a week after its unveiling by the City of Buffalo and City of Buffalo Arts Commission (Director, David More.) Its total destruction was prevented when Lawless drove down to where the sculpture had been unveiled and climbed atop the 30-foot structure in an attempt to prevent workers from cutting it down. He later obtained a court order halting the destruction which had begun by the City under the cloak of darkness well after the Courts had closed. Lawless was one of eight artists accepted to exhibit at Sculpture Chicago '85 in the Spring of 1985. The jurors, Howard Fox of the Los Angeles County Museum of Art, Mary Jane Jacobs of the Museum of Contemporary Art, Chicago, and John Chandler, Director of Supervision, Art Consultancy and Management, Boston, selected Lawless' Green Lightning which was subsequently installed at Harrison and Wells Streets in the South Loop. It stood for five years with no controversy.

In 1992 a jury in the New York State Supreme Court ruled that the Mayor of the City of Buffalo James D. Griffin and the City of Buffalo Urban Renewal Agency had violated Lawless's civil rights with its unauthorized actions in 1984.

In the Spring of 1993 Green Lightning was accepted into an exhibition to be held at the Manhattan Psychiatric Center in New York, New York. The exhibition was sponsored by the Association of Independent Artists and curated by John Rosis and Glenn Reed (See prospectus for this exhibition). When the Director of the Center (Michael Ford) voiced his objections to the sculpture both curators (artists living in New York City) attempted to pressure Lawless into submitting another piece. Lawless refused and the American Civil Liberties Union initiated litigation.

Justice Ira Gammerman of the New York State Supreme Court ruled that the Manhattan Psychiatric Center did have to exhibit the piece but that it was not required to give Lawless the site which he had requested. The Center offered a piece of land which was not large enough to hold the sculpture which effectively precluded Lawless from exhibiting the piece. No artists from the exhibition voiced any support for Lawless.

Years later in a 2014 interview, when Lawless was asked if he would bring the Green Lightning sculpture back to Buffalo, he replied "Any time".

=== Didy Wah Didy ===
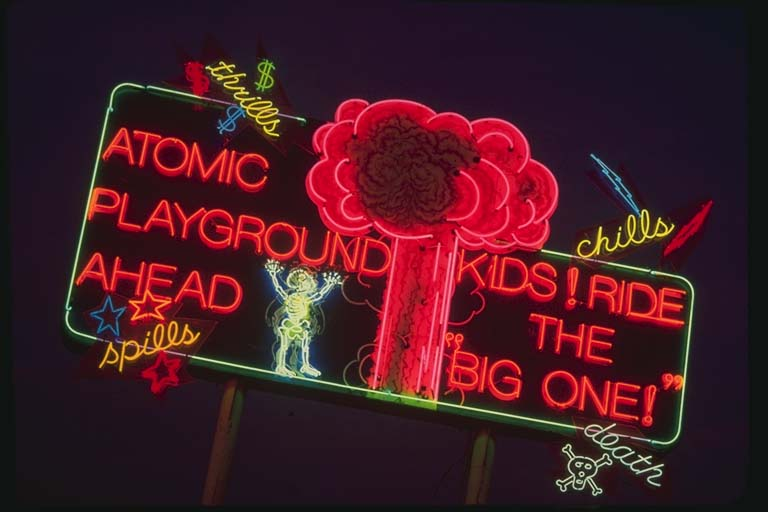
Didy Wah Didy

Didy Wah Didy is named for the last stop on a mythical railroad bound for hell (Black Southern American folklore.) With simple imagery and few words the piece is a timed neon sequence that shows a mushroom cloud forming (animated) over a boy's head. With the words "Atomic Playground Ahead" and "Kids Ride the Big One!" it is a piercing send-up of typical American roadside attractions. In three of the four corners, constantly flashing are the words "chills," "spills" and "thrills." When the "kid", who starts out smiling, then becomes alarmed, is finally "nuked," "death" with an alternating skull and crossbones flashes in the lower right hand corner. The three flashing words are surrounded by the icons common in Lawless' work, thunderbolts, dollar signs and stars. The display takes about 60 seconds to complete its sequence.

=== The Politician A Toy ===
The Politician A Toy is a Lawless sculpture, created under the fiscal umbrella of the Cleveland Public Theatre which is located at 6345 Detroit Avenue, Cleveland, Ohio. The sculpture was funded by some 150 corporations of local and national origin. For many years, the sculpture was located close to downtown at the corner of Chester Avenue and E. 66th Street on a site provided by Roy Kuhn and the Kinco-Balin Corporation. The sculpture stands over forty feet tall and is enclosed with a wrought iron fence forty feet by fifty feet.The sculpture is composed of twenty tons of steel (plate, channels and I-beams), two tons of polypropylene rope (the tail), fiberglass (the bowties), a ton of cedar (the handle), assorted bearings (for the wheels and mouth mechanism,) television sets (the eyes,) industrial epoxy paints and the various electrical components which power the piece. The sculpture is set on four concrete foundations and surrounded by a wrought iron fence five feet tall. The top of the fence is lined with double entrendres of political cliches. The Mayor of Cleveland, Michael R. White, opposed the erection of the sculpture for purely aesthetic reasons ("I 've seen it and I don't like it...." The Plain Dealer, Feb. 19, 1994.) This opposition created difficulty in obtaining the required building permits from the City's Building Department. Ultimately the threat of a Federal lawsuit persuaded City officials to process Lawless' building permits. The sculpture stood on private land for the last thirteen years and was privately funded. Currently, the work resides near the Monte Ahuja College of Business at Cleveland State University, 18th Street and Chester Avenue in downtown Cleveland.

=== $...I Know It When I See It...$ (Uncensored Einstein to Uncensored Bork) ===
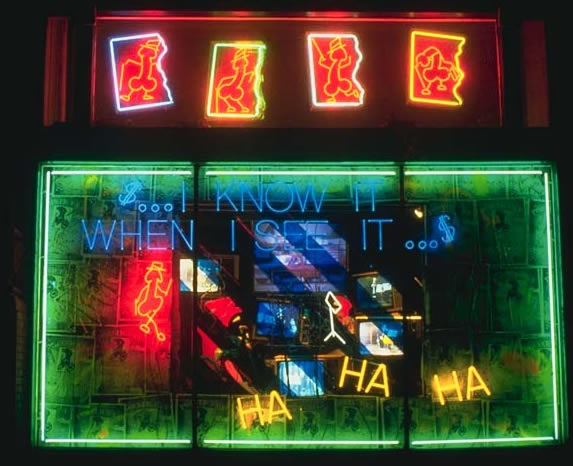

Armed with inspiration in the form of Walter Kendrick's The Secret Museum and Walker Percy's The Message in the Bottle, books dealing with the history of pornography, its suppression, and the nature of language and man, Lawless created a multimedia installation at SPACES (Cleveland), a key work in the Uncensored exhibit in 1987. Although smaller than Green Lightning this work confronted many of the same issues, resurrected the offending "images", and incorporated video technology.

From the title down to the sources for the video clips, Lawless rips political statements out of their contexts and illuminates them with biting irony. Judge Potter Stewart's infamous inadequate definition of pornography forms the title. Passages from the 1986 Meese Report lifted verbatim from banned films and books were used—titillating material, considering it is a government document. A Mozart string quartet and quotes from Albert Einstein and Susan Sontag were also included on scrolling text. Lawless juxtaposes the "safest, most conservative music—that of Mozart—with scenes from The Devil and Miss Jones, and comments on the frequent censorship in art as compared to music and science.

Framing the video monitors was a wall of manufactured political posters slapped up repetitively with graffiti, and superimposed on what was a timed sequence of the same neon penis figure stepping up to a podium to direct the proceedings. Although much of the work is tongue-in-cheek, it addresses the issue of censorship, tries to define the weird line between pornography and art, and wrestles with the urge for communication under government suppression.

=== Broasted Babies Brew-ha-ha ===
Broasted Babies Brew Ha Ha - was first shown at SPACES in Cleveland, Ohio in March 1989. It was exhibited again at CAGE in Cincinnati Ohio in the Fall of 1992. It is a full gallery installation that involved repainting the walls of the gallery a bright pink and which were then layered with stencils, enlarged photocopied recipes with alterations by Lawless, and tri-fold silkscreened plastic panels that had animated swinging babies. On the floor Lawless laid out enlarged images from original photographs of the My Lai Massacre in Vietnam. These photographs were purchased from the National Archives which included full usage of the copyright. Between and on top of these photographs were laid icons that incorporated images repeatedly used by Lawless in his work set in decorated rat traps.

Between the photographs and leading toward the center of the installation (a broken crucifix on a funeral pyre) were spermlike images composed of yellow paint pigment. Following these images toward the center were multicolored, silkscreened, folded rats that started amassed from one wall in a corner of the gallery. The broken crucifix approximately 8' wide and 10' long and 2' high and composed of sheet metal rested on a funeral pyre of ascending railroad ties. Inside this crucifix in each corner was a small television set which had a looping video that dealt with a carefully chosen metaphor referring to genocide. The cover of this crucifix was 1/4" Lexan, painted with images of babies in severed sections. Crisscrossed and also inside were the words BROASTED and BABIES in a light blue neon. According to Lawless this installation dealt with the subject of 2000 years of genocide as perfected by mankind.

=== Cock-a-doodle-doo ===
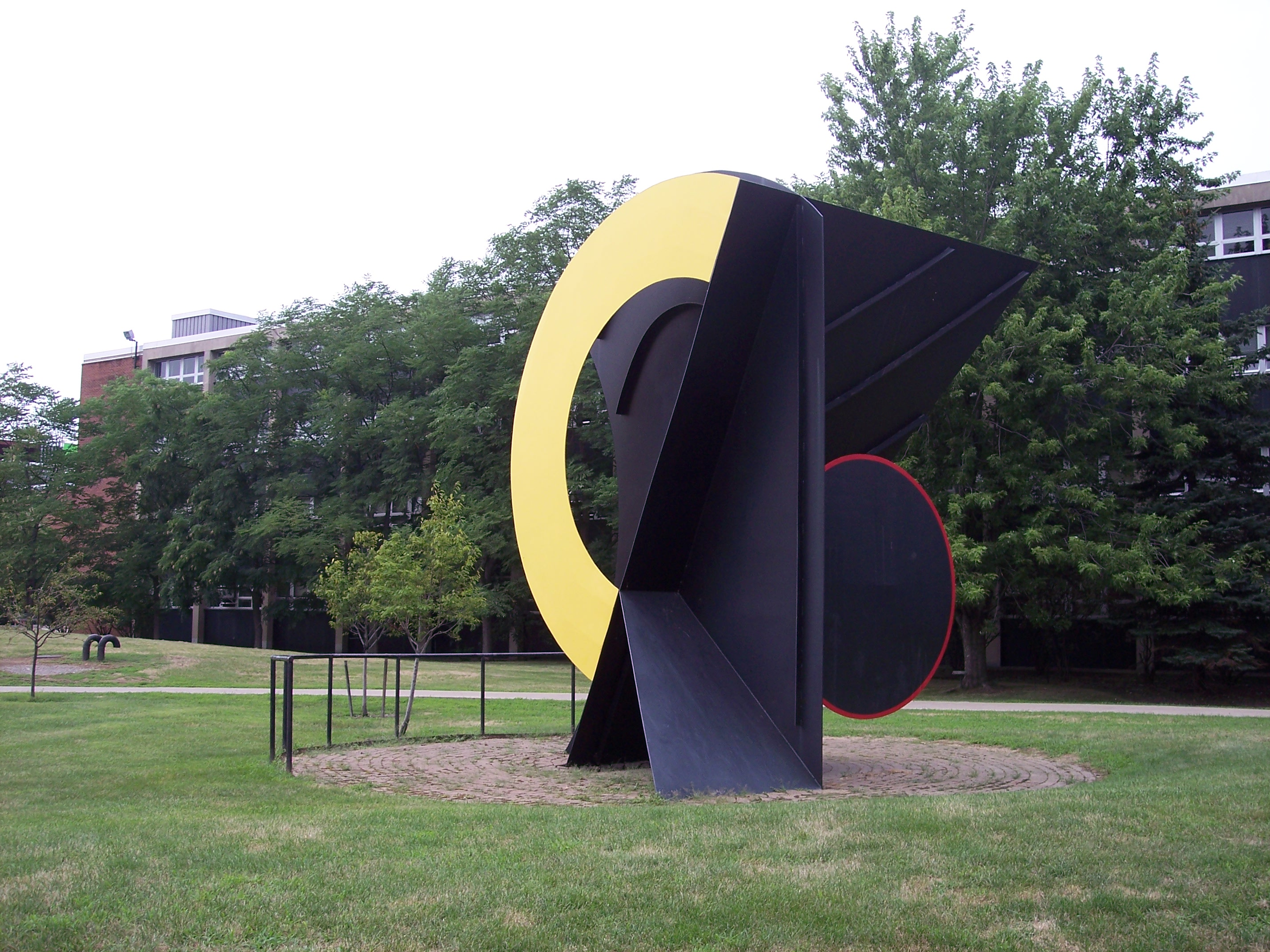
Cock-a-doodle-doo

Cock-a-doodle-doo is located at SUNY College at Buffalo, across from the Albright-Knox Art Gallery in Buffalo, New York. The sculpture stands 26' High and is 23' wide and 19' deep. The sculpture is composed of steel plate that has been heat treated, sandblasted and finished with epoxy paints. This piece is one of a series of six pieces created by Lawless that deal with a subtle shift of planes, intersections and juxtapositions, formalist in nature, and were the last of his abstract work.

==== Other abstract work ====
Other works in the abstract sculpture series include:

- Hungry Fish is an 18' tall abstract and figurative sculpture.
- Life Savers which is located in Philadelphia, PA on the campus of the University of Pennsylvania.
- Dancing Fish which is in the collection of the Buscaglia-Castellani Art Gallery, Niagara University, Niagara Falls, NY.

== Photo gallery ==
The Politician and Protege

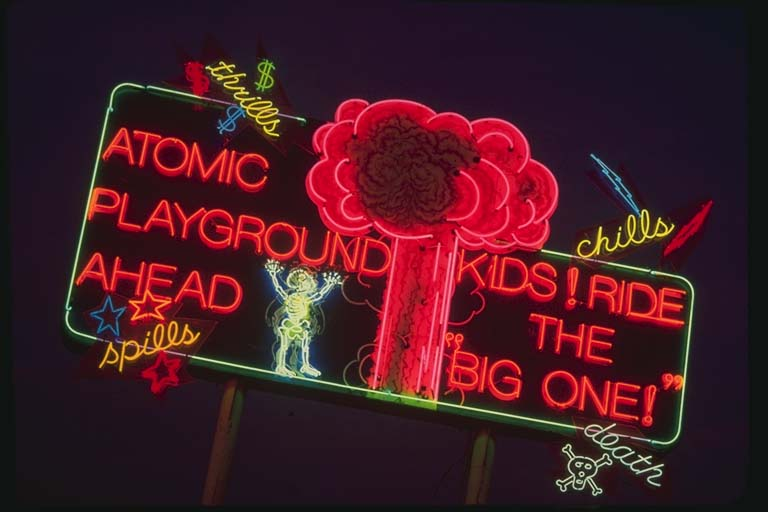
Didy Wah Didy

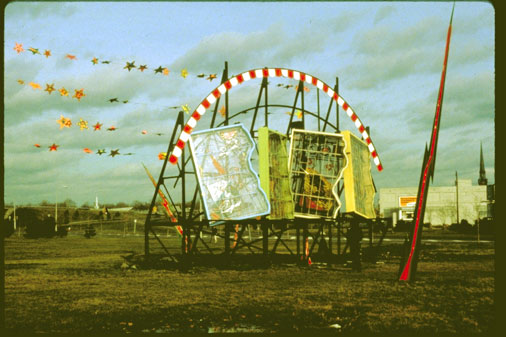
Green Lightning

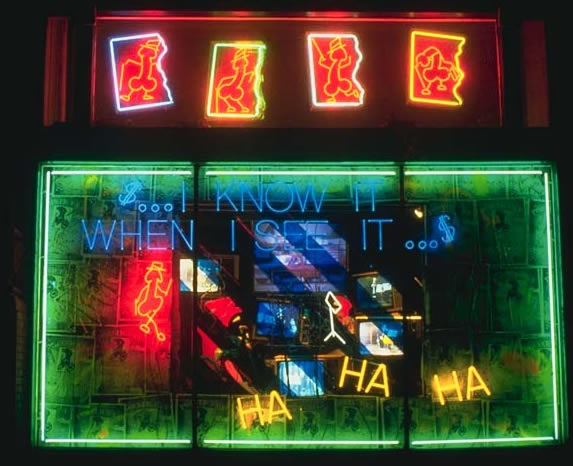
I Know It When I See It
