= Tomoyasu =

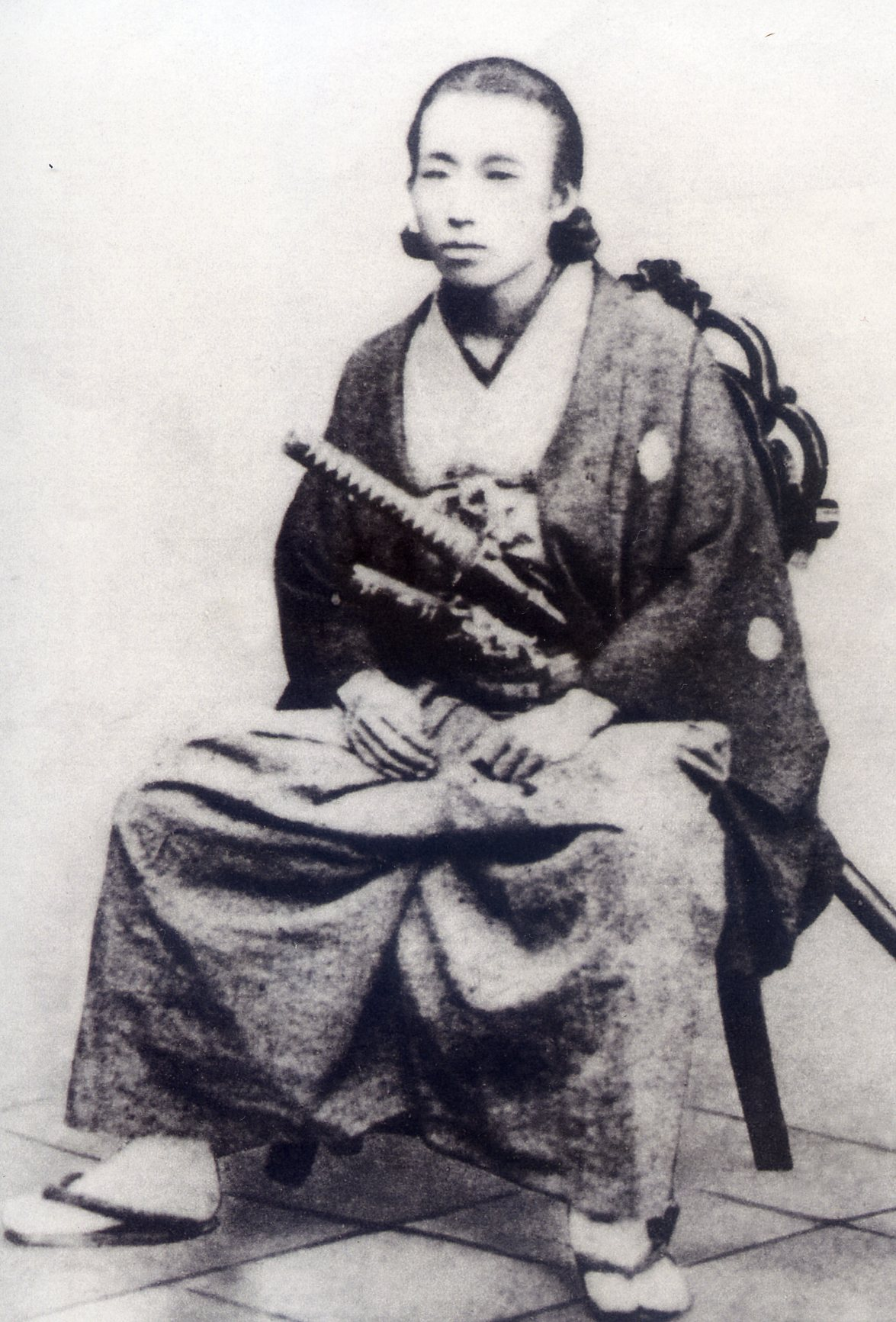
- Tomoyasu Sagara (1836–1906), Dutch-trained Japanese physician
- Pronunciation: tomojasɯ (IPA)
- Gender: Male

Origin
- Origin: Japanese
- Meaning: Different meanings depending on the kanji used

Tomoyasu is a masculine Japanese given name.

== Written forms ==
Tomoyasu can be written using many different combinations of kanji characters. Some examples:

- 友康, "friend, healthy"
- 友安, "friend, peaceful"
- 友靖, "friend, peaceful"
- 友泰, "friend, peaceful"
- 友保, "friend, preserve"
- 知康, "know, healthy"
- 知安, "know, peaceful"
- 知泰, "know, peaceful"
- 知保, "know, preserve"
- 知易, "know, divination"
- 智康, "intellect, healthy"
- 智安, "intellect, peaceful"
- 智靖, "intellect, peaceful"
- 共安, "together, peaceful"
- 朋泰, "companion, peaceful"
- 朝靖, "morning/dynasty, peaceful"
- 朝安, "morning/dynasty, peaceful"
- 朝保, "morning/dynasty, preserve"

The name can also be written in hiragana ともやす or katakana トモヤス.

== Notable people with the name ==
- Tomoyasu Ando (安藤 智安; born 1974), Japanese footballer
- Tomoyasu Asaoka (浅岡 朝泰; 1962-2021), Japanese footballer
- Tomoyasu Hirose (廣瀬 智靖; born 1989), Japanese footballer
- Tomoyasu Hotei (布袋 寅泰; born 1962), Japanese musician
- Tomoyasu Mimura (三村 智保; born 1969), Japanese Go player
- Tomoyasu Sagara (相良 知安; 1836–1906), Dutch-trained Japanese physician
