= Asiatic Society of Japan =

Japanese non-profit organization

The Asiatic Society of Japan, Inc.
- Trade name: The Asiatic Society of Japan or ASJ
- Native name: 一般社団法人日本アジア協会
- Romanized name: Ippan Shadan Hojin Nihon Ajia Kyokai
- Company type: NPO
- Predecessor: The Asiatic Society of Japan (est. 1872)
- Founded: 1872. Incorporated as a non-profit in 2019 September
- Headquarters: Tokyo, Japan
- Key people: Board of Directors Yuichiro Anzai, Chairman Ambassador Yoshinori Katori, Representative Director and President Morihiko Otaki Kyoko Mimura Bashir Mohabbat Norbert Palanovics Osamu Moriya, Statutory Auditor
- Website: asjapan.org

Logo of the Asiatic Society of Japan, with Kanji characters in Seal script. Read top-to-bottom and right-to-left: 日本 / アジア / 協会 (The Society's name, one word per column).

The Asiatic Society of Japan, Inc. (一般社団法人日本アジア協会, Ippan Shadan Hōjin Nihon Ajia Kyōkai) or "ASJ" is a non-profit organization of Japanology. ASJ serves members of a general audience that have shared interests in Japan.

Founded in 1872 as The Asiatic Society of Japan (日本アジア協会, Nihon Ajia Kyōkai; lit. '"Japan Asia Society"'), ASJ is Japan's oldest learned society. The Honorary Patron is Hisako, Princess Takamado. The Representative Director and President as of September 2019 is H.E. Ambassador Yoshinori Kato.

== Overview ==
The Asiatic Society of Japan's founders set into motion coordinated activities "to collect and publish information on subjects relating to Japan and other Asiatic Countries." They intentionally differentiated ASJ from its affiliated Royal Asiatic societies of the day by having established ASJ as a "Society for scholarly gentlemen" rather than a society of scholars. Nor was "Royal" to be used in ASJ's title, a measure to encourage Japanese people to join. Women also began to join within a few years. ASJ quickly became the first organization of its kind in Japan to promote the sharing of discoveries about Japan to the rest of the world.

ASJ was founded at a meeting held on 8 October 1872 at the Grand Hotel, Yokohama, when Robert Grant Watson of the British Legation was elected the first President, and the first papers were read there on 30 October—Notes on Loochoo by Ernest Mason Satow, then Japanese Secretary at the British Legation, and The Hyalonema Mirabilis, a marine biological study by Henry Hadlow, a Royal Navy surgeon. The opening papers were significant for two reasons: the subjects themselves, and the presence of James Curtis Hepburn and Satow at the very beginning of the ASJ's life.

ASJ's founders and earliest members were adventurous leaders who became pillars of Japan's modernization and industrialization at the dawn of Meiji Period. Physicians, scientists, teachers, engineers, military officers, lawyers, and diplomats numbered among them. In those days, there were numerous organizations like ASJ, each in their own way serving as focal points for documenting and discussing the discoveries that were being made by the men who were participating in the building of a new Japan. Many members of ASJ were also members of the other organizations.

Japanese members who were central to the Meiji Restoration included: Kanō Jigorō, Baron Naibu Kanda, Tsuda Sen, Nakamura Masanao, and Viscount Mori Arinori.

The 'foreign expert' group included James Curtis Hepburn, Josiah Conder; John Milne, Edward Divers, James Main Dixon and Charles Dickinson West, all of the Imperial College of Engineering; Henry Faulds of the Tsukiji Hospital; Robert Maclagan of the Osaka Mint; Basil Hall Chamberlain; William George Aston, and Ernest Mason Satow.

ASJ trained a generation of Japanese teachers and students, making the 'foreign experts' superfluous. By the 1890s, ASJ's first generation of Japanese and foreign members—leaders of change in Meiji—began to move on. Academicians began to make-up more of the membership. Today, the membership is approximately: academicians (46%); businesspeople (36%); students, fine arts, clergy, retired and other (18%).

ASJ is still active today. Members meet monthly to hear a guest explain discoveries based on original research. The lectures last approximately fifty minutes and are followed by questions and discussion. Topics have come from the full spectrum of fields of knowledge as related to Japan, including culture, history, literature, science, business, politics, and economics.

== Publications ==
The Transactions of the Asiatic Society of Japan
- Language: English

Standard abbreviations
- ISO 4: Trans. Asiat. Soc. Jpn.

Indexing
- 1st series
- ISSN: 0287-6035
- 2nd series (ISSN-L)
- ISSN: 0287-6043
- 3rd series
- ISSN: 0287-6051
- 4th & 5th series
- ISSN: 0913-4271

The Transactions of the Asiatic Society of Japan is a journal that contains the full texts of selected papers presented at meetings, as well as other papers submitted for publication. The ASJ also publishes a monthly newsletter known as the Bulletin, which contains a detailed summary of the previous month's lecture, lecturers' profiles, announcements of coming events, and news about the ASJ and its members.

For most of the ASJ's history, there has been no limit to the range of interests covered. The first ten volumes of the Society's Transactions, 1872–1882, printed 146 papers, of which 25 can be roughly classified as geographical or topographical. They are, however, far outnumbered by the largest subject grouping: the scientific papers during the same period, which included 52 studies. But to take the figures further, during the second decade, 1882–1892, 107 papers were printed, of which 4 were geographical and 18 scientific, a reflection of the end of the 'exploration' phase of Meiji. The men who contributed to the ASJ during its first 20 years began to move on to other activities.

On the 110th anniversary of the ASJ, after having completed his historical account of the first one hundred years of the ASJ, President Douglas Moore Kenrick remarked:

The only requirement of authors, and this is the root of our policy, is that each is expected to tell us something in his or her field that has not been previously published. We ask for something new. The Transactions have covered an extraordinarily wide range of Japanese studies and the papers provide a fascinating conspectus of Western achievements in the field of Japanology over the decades, as well as useful examinations of many subjects that have not been treated elsewhere."

== Early presidents ==
Presidents of the organization during the 19th century:

- 1872–1873: Robert Grant Watson
- 1873–1874: Dr James Curtis Hepburn
- 1874–1876: Samuel Robbins Brown
- 1876–1878: Harry Smith Parkes
- 1878–1879: David Murray
- 1879–1880: Edward W. Syle
- 1880–1881: Edward Divers, FRS
- 1881–1882: J Gordon Kenney
- 1882–1883: Sir Harry Smith Parkes
- 1883–1885: James Curtis Hepburn
- 1885–1888: Nicholas John Hannen
- 1888–1889: William George Aston
- 1889–1890: Rev James Lansing Amerman
- 1890–1891: Nicholas John Hannen
- 1891–1893: Prof. Basil Hall Chamberlain
- 1893–1895: Rev Daniel Crosby Greene
- 1895–1900: Sir Ernest Mason Satow

== Notable members ==
In addition to the early presidents, other members who joined during the first 111 years (1872–1983) of the organization include:

- Masaharu Anesaki
- Mori Arinori
- Josiah Conder
- Hugh Cortazzi
- James Main Dixon
- Henry Faulds
- John Harington Gubbins
- Kanō Jigorō
- Lafcadio Hearn
- Baron Naibu Kanda
- Donald Keene
- Neal Lawrence
- Robert Maclagan
- John Milne
- Masanao Nakamura
- Edwin O. Reischauer
- Donald Richie
- Edward Seidensticker
- Tsuda Sen
- Charles Dickinson West
