= William Verbeck =

American educator and soldier

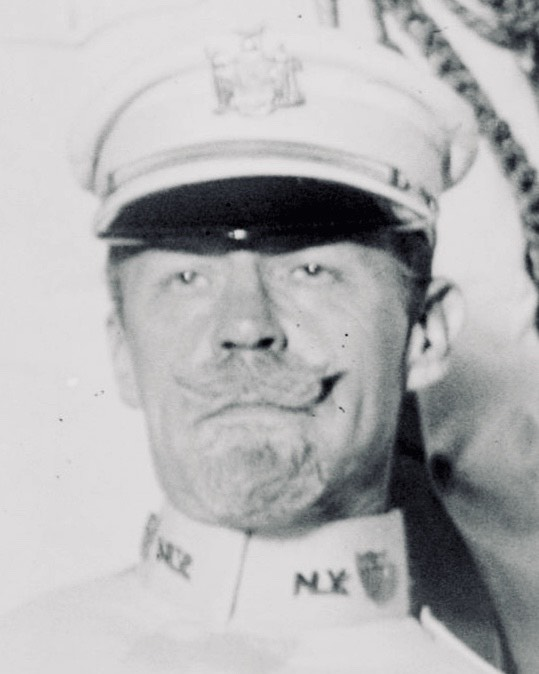
- Verbeck in 1911
- Born: January 18, 1861; Nagasaki, Japan
- Died: August 24, 1930 (aged 69); Manlius, New York, U.S.
- Education: Imperial University of Japan
- Occupation: Soldier
- Known for: Scouting
- Spouse: Katherine Jordan (m. 1886)
- Children: 3
- Parents: Guido Verbeck (father); Maria Manion (mother)
- Relatives: Gustave Verbeek (brother)

William Verbeck (January 18, 1861 – August 24, 1930) was an American educator and soldier. He served as head of the St. John's Military Academy in New York. He also served as Adjutant General of New York, commander of the New York National Guard from June 1, 1910, to January 1, 1913, and was given the rank of brigadier general.

== Early life and education ==
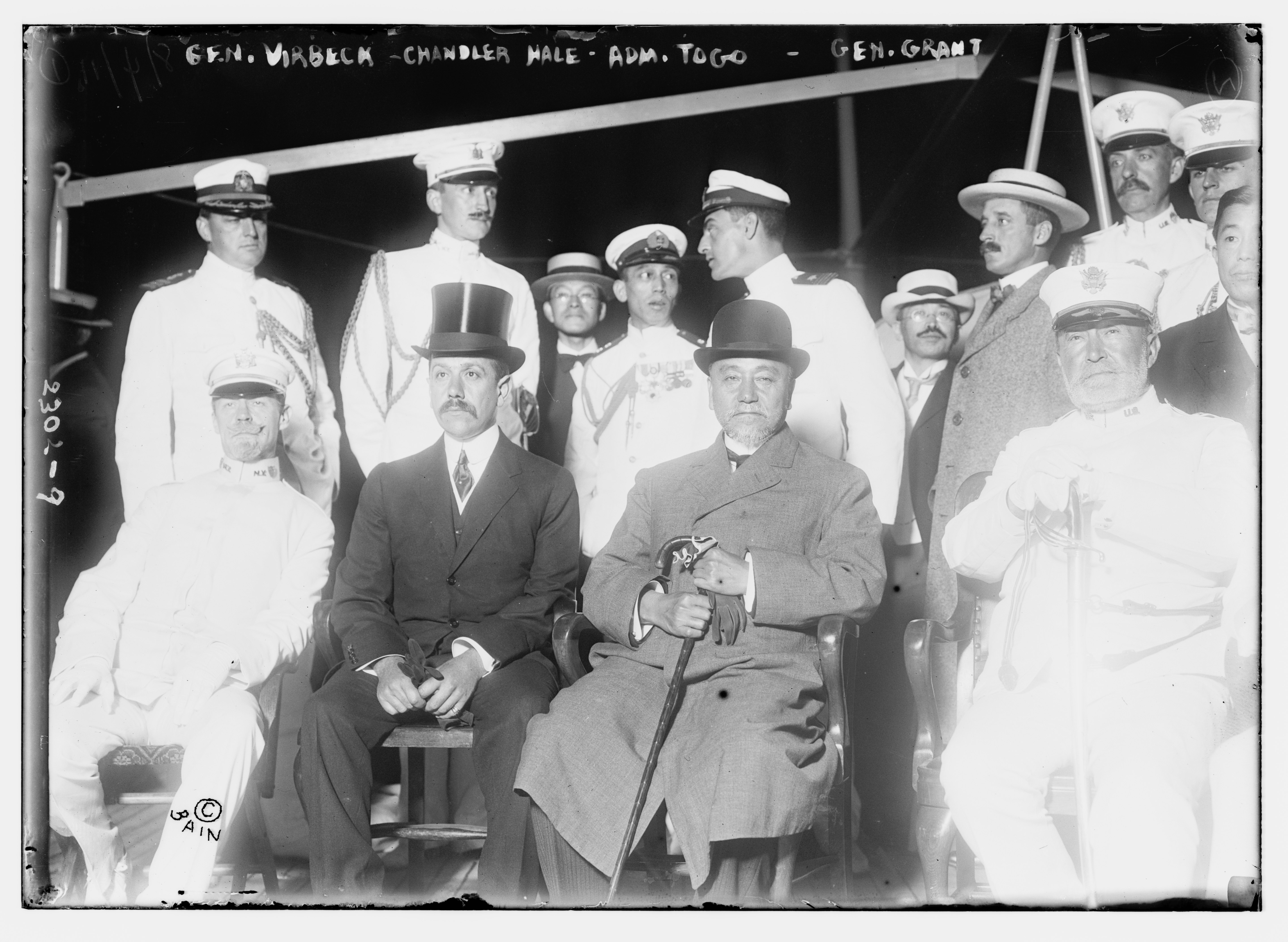
Verbeck with Assistant secretary of state Chandler Hale, Admiral Togo; Major General Frederick D. Grant on board the Lusitania

Verbeck was born in Nagasaki, Japan, on January 18, 1861, the son of Guido Verbeck and Maria Verbeck (née Manion). His father worked in Nagasaki as a missionary and educator for the Dutch Reformed Church. He was one of six brothers and three sisters. His brother was the cartoonist, Gustave Verbeek.

In 1879, at the age of 18, Verbeck emigrated to the United States. He enrolled in the California Military Academy. He served in the Fifth California Infantry, rising to the rank of major.

== Career ==
Following in his father's footsteps, Verbeck began teaching at the Saint Matthew's Hall, in San Mateo, California, where he taught for two years. He moved to New York state to work with C.J. Wright at the Cayuga Lake Military Academy and the Peekskill Military Academy. He moved to St. John's Academy, where he became its president, serving there until he succeeded Nelson H. Henry as Adjutant General of New York. He served as Adjutant General of New York, commander of the New York National Guard, from June 1, 1910, to January 1, 1913, and was given the rank of Brigadier General.

Verbeck led the National Scouts of America (NSA), running summer camps for boys at Camp Massawepie in conjunction with the Manlius School. Upon the merger of the NSA with the Boy Scouts of America he briefly served as a National Commissioner of the Boy Scouts of America.

== Personal life ==
He married Katherine Jordan on July 28, 1886. They had three children: Guido Fridolin, Karl Heinrich Willem and William Jordan. In 1927, Verbeck was made a Commander of the Order of the Crown of Italy. He was granted American citizenship on June 9, 1929, in an Act of Congress.

He died on August 24, 1930, of heart disease at his home in Manlius.
