= Duane B. Simmons =

American physician, educator and lay Christian missionary

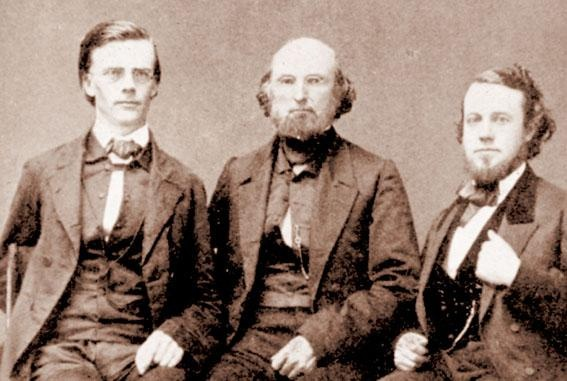
- Guido Verbeck、Samuel Robbins Brown、Duane Simmons
- Born: 13 August 1832; Milan, New York, U.S.
- Died: 19 February 1889 (aged 56); Tokyo, Japan
- Known for: Medical missionary, tutor and surgeon in Japan

Duane B. Simmons, MD (August 13, 1832 – February 19, 1889) was an American physician, educator and lay Christian missionary. Along with James Curtis Hepburn he is known as one of the pioneers of modern medicine during the Bakumatsu and early Meiji Era in Japan.

== Background and early life ==
Simmons was born in Milan, New York, on August 13, 1832.

== Work in Japan ==
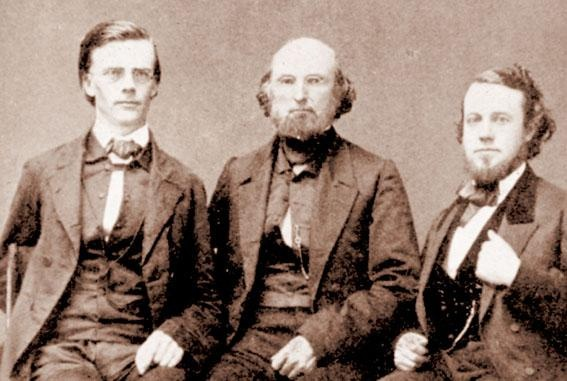
Guido Verbeck, Samuel Robbins Brown and Duane B. Simmons (right) in 1859

In May 1859, Simmons set sail to Japan as a medical missionary with the Dutch Reformed Church. After a few months in Japan, Simmons made a friendly separation from the mission and established his own private medical practice treating both expatriates and Japanese at his surgery and small hospital in Yokohama.

In 1870, Simmons was the attending physician to Fukuzawa Yukichi when he was sick with typhus. Fukuzawa and Simmons became lifelong friends as a result of this encounter; Fukuzawa building accommodation for Simmons and his elderly mother on the grounds of the Keio University Mita campus in Minato, Tokyo.

Since 1871, Simmons had worked as surgeon at Juzen Hospital (today Yokohama City University Medical Center) in Yokohama for several years.

Simmons died on February 2, 1889, at his home in Mita and was buried in Aoyama Cemetery.
