= Green Lightning (sculpture) =

Sculpture by artist Billie Lawless

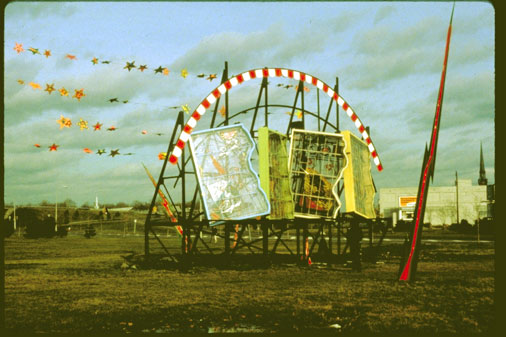
- Green Lightning, 1984. Steel, LEXAN, tin, transformers, neon, electricity, wire, animators and concrete.
- Artist: Billie Lawless
- Year: November 1984
- Location: Buffalo, New York, U.S.

Green Lightning is a sculpture created by artist Billie Lawless. An original maquette was created for ArtPark in the fall of 1983, and the sculpture was dedicated in Buffalo, New York, in November 1984.

== Description ==
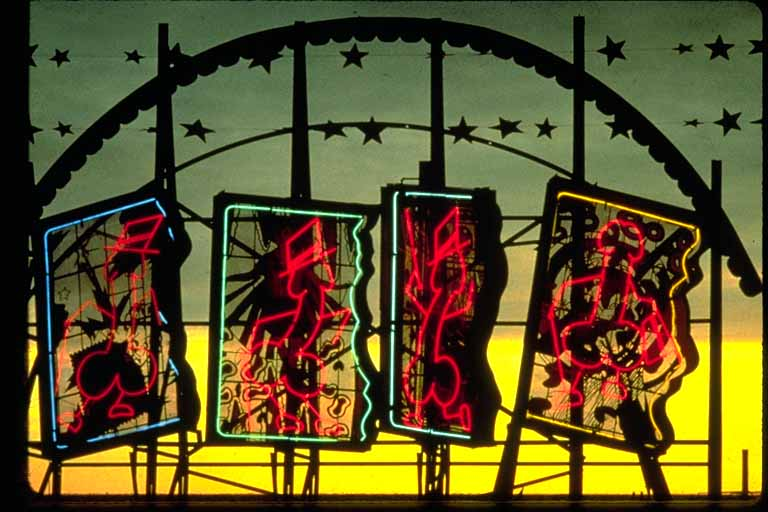
Green Lightning at night

The work features 13 lightning bolts ranging in height from 13 to 30 feet (4.0 to 9.1 m) shooting into the ground over a 180-by-160-foot (55 by 49 m) area. On a main sign-like structure were four boxes measuring 8 by 10 by 2 feet (2.44 m × 3.05 m × 0.61 m) with images silk-screened on the back dealing with contemporary social issues. In front of these images and protected by clear LEXAN panels were neon tubes of a graffiti image that Lawless found on the side of a condemned building. These figures were a pun on Planters' Mr. Peanut character, appearing to be dancing penises dressed up with a top hat and a cane. In the fourth box, a sixty-second sequence featured the character removing his top hat and taking a bow to the crowd. Behind and above the main steel structure that held these boxes were four rows of brightly painted tin stars that spun in the wind, a metaphor for the cosmos.

== History ==
The sculpture was built in Buffalo, New York, over a period of two years and dedicated in November 1984. Construction of the work on its site started on October 6, and it was completed and lit on November 15.

Some city officials found the work to be offensive, and Mayor Jimmy Griffin ordered it removed on November 20, 5 days after initial lighting. Attempts at removing the sculpture began under the cover of night by a sign company with no knowledge of handling sculpture and resulted in significant damage to the work. Its total destruction was prevented when Lawless drove to where the sculpture had been unveiled and climbed atop the 30-foot (9.1 m) structure in an attempt to prevent workers from cutting it down.

Lawless later obtained a court order by New York State Supreme Court Justice, Vincent Doyle, who issued an injunction and publicly denounced the actions of the Mayor in a hearing the following day. Lawless sued, claiming that his rights were being infringed; the city contended that the sculpture, as erected, was not representative of the model they had been presented with. Billie Lawless won the lawsuit but was awarded no damages.

The sculpture was eventually removed from Buffalo and relocated to Chicago at Sculpture Chicago '85, where it stood unmolested for ten years.

It is currently in storage in Cleveland, Ohio.

Years later in a 2014 interview, when Lawless was asked if he would bring the Green Lightning sculpture back to Buffalo, he replied "Any time".

== See also ==
- Billie Lawless
