= John West (priest) =

Irish Anglican priest

John West was an Irish Anglican priest. He was Dean of St Patrick's Cathedral, Dublin in the Church of Ireland from 1864 to 1889.

Educated at Trinity College, Dublin, he was ordained in 1830 and began his ordained ministry career as curate at Monkstown, Dublin. He was the incumbent at St Ann's Dublin, and then archdeacon of the city before his appointment to the Deanery, a post he held for 25 years. He died on 5 July 1890.

His son Charles Dickinson West became an engineer and naval architect.
