= Rainbow (sculpture) =

Public art work by Duayne Hatchett

Coordinates: 43°10′36.5″N 87°56′14.0″W

- Artist: Duayne Hatchett
- Year: 1970
- Type: painted aluminum
- Location: Lynden Sculpture Garden, Milwaukee, Wisconsin
- Owner: Bradley Family Foundation

Rainbow is a public art work by artist Duayne Hatchett located at the Lynden Sculpture Garden near Milwaukee, Wisconsin. The sculpture's abstract form is in the shape of an arc; it is installed on the lawn.
