= Gustave Verbeek =

American artist (1867–1937)

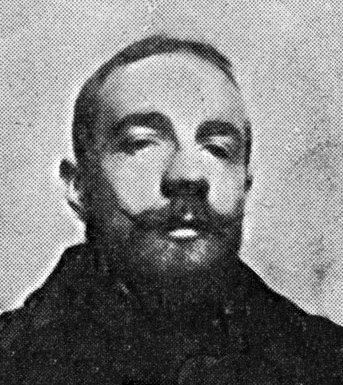
- Verbeek in 1895
- Born: Gustave Verbeck; August 29, 1867; Nagasaki, Japan
- Died: December 5, 1937 (aged 70); New York City, U.S.
- Occupation: Cartoonist
- Notable work: The Upside Downs of Little Lady Lovekins and Old Man Muffaroo
- Parents: Guido Verbeck (father); Maria Manion (mother)
- Relatives: William Verbeck (brother)

Gustave Verbeek (Dutch: [fərˈbeːk]; born Gustave Verbeck Dutch: [fərˈbɛk]; August 29, 1867 – December 5, 1937) was a Japanese-born American illustrator and cartoonist of Dutch ancestry, best known for his newspaper cartoons in the early 1900s featuring an inventive use of word play and visual storytelling tricks.

== Biography ==
Verbeek was born in Nagasaki, Japan, in 1867, the son of Reformed Church in America missionary Guido Verbeck, of Dutch ancestry, and his wife Maria (née Manion).

He grew up in Japan, but went to Paris to study art, and worked for several European newspapers, creating illustrations and cartoons. In 1900, he moved to the United States, where he did illustrations for magazines such as Harper's, and produced a series of weekly comic strips for newspapers. In the 1910s, he abandoned cartooning and became a fine artist. He was noted for his expressionist monotypes, which were the subject of an article in The Century Magazine in June 1916.

He was ill for two years, and died on December 5, 1937, at the Home for Incurables, on Third Avenue and 183rd Street in the Bronx, New York. He had been a patient there for two months.

== Comics ==
Verbeek's first strip was Easy Papa, a fairly conventional strip about two mischievous kids and their father, similar to the highly popular contemporary strip The Katzenjammer Kids, which ran in a competing newspaper. Easy Papa appeared in The New York Herald from May 25, 1902, through February 1, 1903.

Verbeek's strips could be seen differently when viewed upside down (this image will flip upside-down automatically)

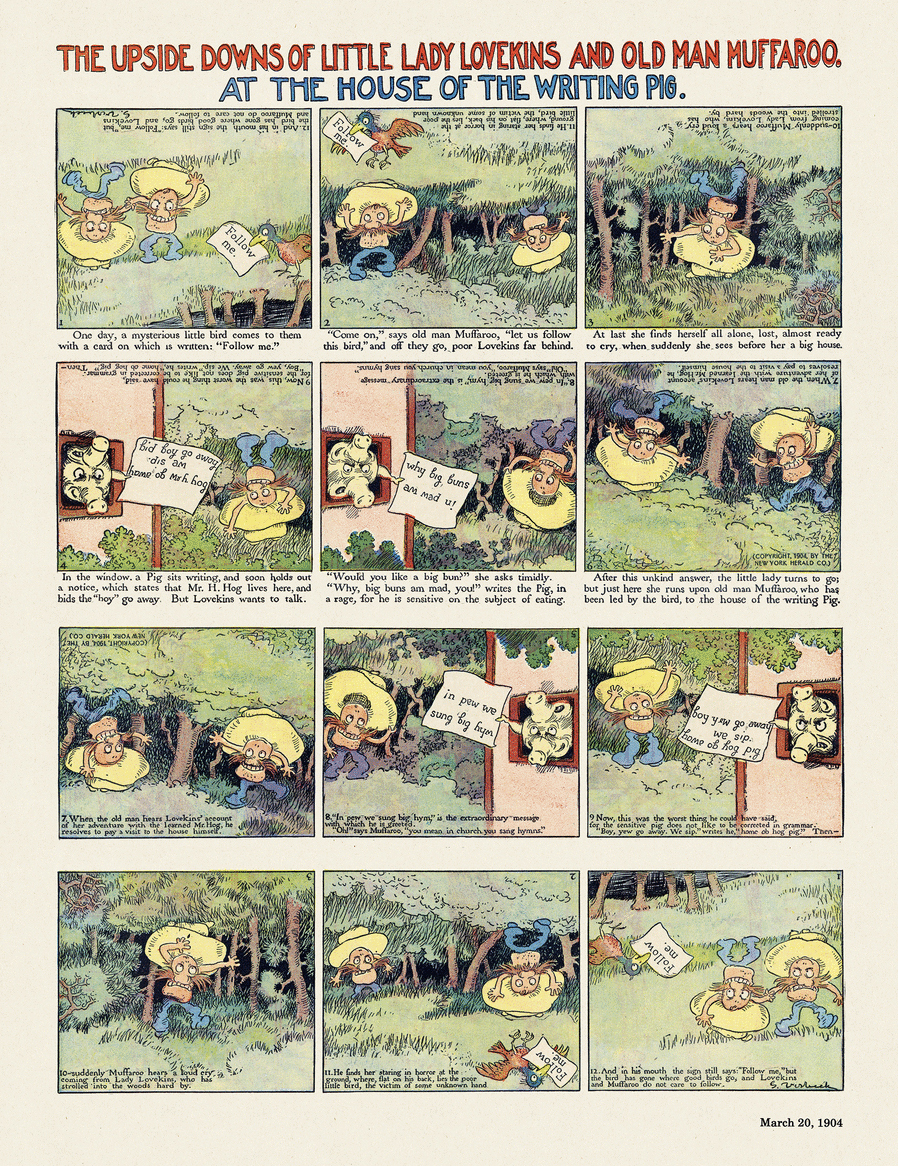
At the house of the writing pig.

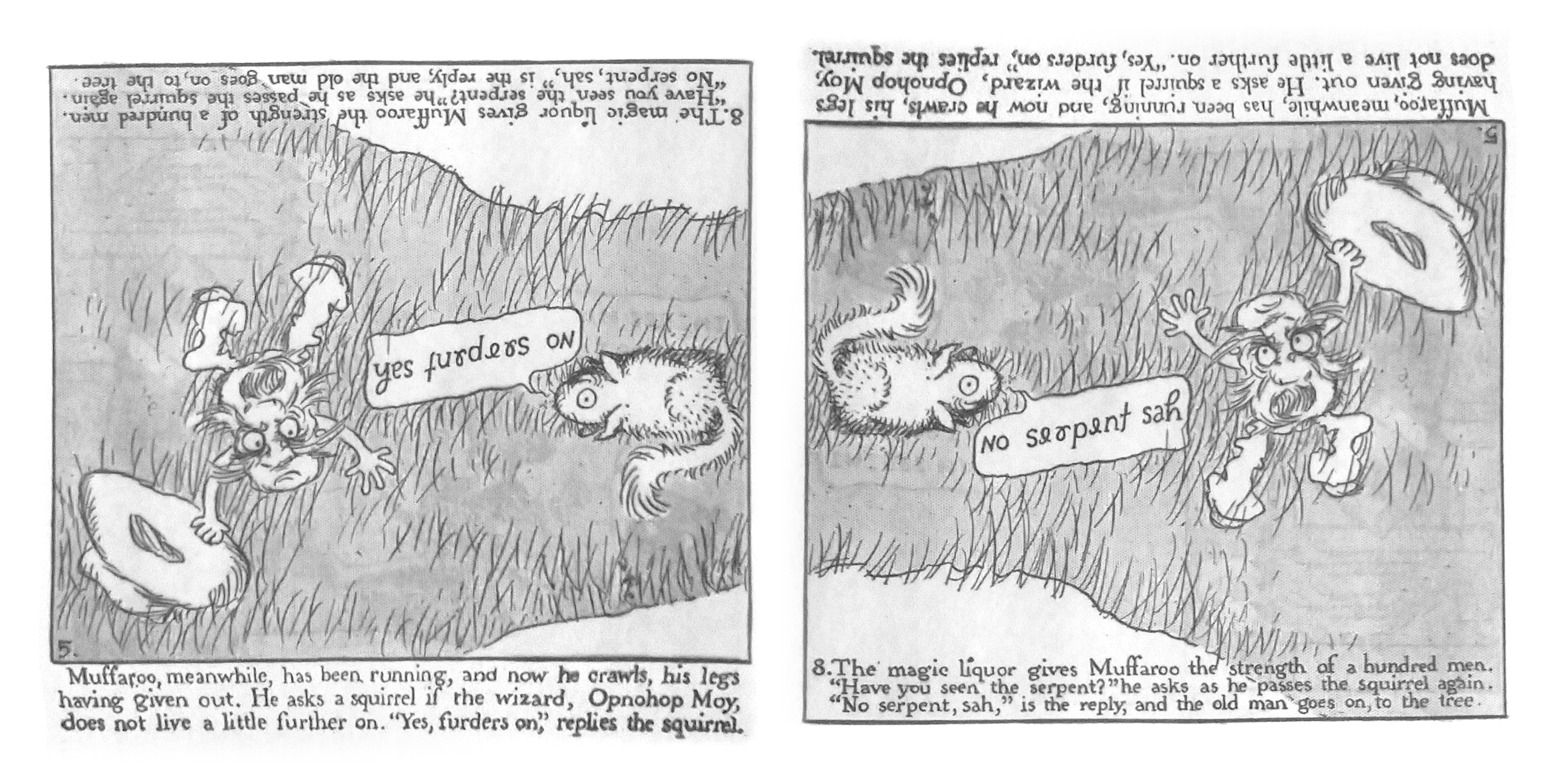
Fourth panel of the story The bad snake and the good wizard.

The Upside Downs of Little Lady Lovekins and Old Man Muffaroo , comics by Gustave Verbeek containing reversible figures and ambigram sentences (March 1904).

Verbeek is most noted for The Upside Downs of Little Lady Lovekins and Old Man Muffaroo, a weekly 6-panel comic strip in which the first half of the story was illustrated and captioned right-side-up, then the reader would turn the page up-side-down, and the inverted illustrations with additional captions describing the scenes told the second half of the story, for a total of 12 panels. His signature usually appeared at the top of the first/last panel, upside down. The two main characters were designed such that each would be perceived as the other character when inverted. For example, in one often-reproduced panel, Muffaroo appears in a canoe next to a tree-covered island, and is being attacked by a large fish. When inverted, the image shows a later scene of Lovekins in the beak of a giant roc: Muffaroo's canoe has become the bird's beak, the fish has turned into the bird's head, the island has become its body and the trees its legs, and Muffaroo has turned into Lovekins. Verbeek created a total of 64 of these strips for The New York Herald, from October 11, 1903, to January 15, 1905. A pilot strip was published on October 4, 1903. The format of the strip put extreme restrictions on the use of word balloons (even with the use of ambigrams only three strips used word-balloons, all in March 1904). Although the July 10, 1904, strip implies that the stories are set in America, Verbeek filled his milieu with African animals and peoples, fabulous monsters, fairy castles, etc.

Verbeek's longest-running strip was The Terrors of the Tiny Tads, published by the Herald from May 28, 1905, to October 28, 1914. This strip features a group of four unnamed and interchangeable boys, who encounter a variety of strange creatures based on inventive word combinations. For example, they find a "hippopautomobile" (a hippopotamus with a steering wheel and seating in its back as in an automobile), a "pelicanoe" (a pelican in which a rider could sit and paddle like a canoe), and a "samovarmint" (a samovar for serving tea with the head and claws of a wild animal). As with The Upside Downs, the strip's text consisted of captions below the illustrations; there were no speech balloons. Dan Nadel describes the strip as "quiet, subdued, and somnambulant" in character, partly because Verbeek eschewed "speed lines, stars of pain", and other such cartoon conventions. Although most strips involved strange creatures, the tads had a clash with a pair of aggressive suffragettes in the June 28, 1914, strip.

He created a short-lived comic strip in 1910 called The Loony Lyrics of Lulu. These strips are about a girl who encounters imaginary creatures and writes (inoffensive) limericks about them.

=== Reprints ===
Verbeek's strips got republished multiple times over the years, always only a subselection however until Sunday Press Books released their complete collection.

- The Incredible Upside-Downs of Little Lady Lovekins and Old Man Muffaroo, G.W. Dillingham Company (New York) in 1905.
- The Incredible Upside-Downs of Gustave Verbeek, The Rajah Press ( Summit, NJ) in 1963.
- The Incredible Upside-Downs (of Gustave Verbeek), Real Free Press International (Amsterdam;) in 1973.
- The Incredible Upside-Downs of Gustave Verbeek, Nostalgia Press, Incorporated (New York) in 1976. ISBN 0911204016.
- Niet Te Geloven Ondersteboven!, Erven Thomas Rap (Amsterdam) in 1976. ISBN 9060051106.
- Dessus-Dessous, Pierre Horay (Paris) in 1978. ISBN 2705800778.
- Four Confusing Tales, Each Illustrated by Six Up-Turnable Pictures, from the Incredible Topsy-Turvy World of Gustave Verbeek, Tobar Limited (Harleston, Norfolk), 1990's. ISBN 1903230004.
- Unten ist Oben, Comic Companie ( Frankfurt/Main 1; Germany) in 1985. ISBN 3820101802.
- 少女ラブキンズとマファルー老人の冒険 (The Incredible Upside-Downs of Gustave Verbeek), TBS Publications, Tokyo in 1987. ISBN 4782510713. Edited by 坂根厳夫 (Itsuo Sakane).
- The Upside-Down World of Gustave Verbeek, Sunday Press Books (Palo Alto, CA) in 2009. ISBN 0976888572.

The 2009 reprint contains the complete The Upside-Downs of Little Lady Lovekins and Old Man Muffaroo and the complete Loony Lyrics of Lulu together with other selected samples from Verbeek's comics career.

=== Remakes ===
In 2012, a remake of Verbeek's Upside-downs was published by Swedish publisher Epix. The book 'In Uppåner med Lilla Lisen & Gamle Muppen' (ISBN 978-91-7089-524-1) by Marcus Ivarsson shows 24 of Verbeek's comics redrawn in the style of the author. No other attempts were made to replicate the 'upside-down' comic style.
