= Guido Verbeck =

Dutch political advisor, educator and missionary

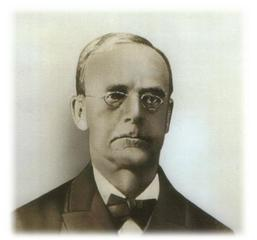
- Verbeck c. 1887
- Born: Guido Herman Fridolin Verbeek; 23 January 1830; Zeist, Netherlands
- Died: 10 March 1898 (aged 68); Tokyo, Japan
- Occupations: Missionary; educator; foreign advisor
- Known for: foreign advisor to Meiji Japan
- Spouse: Maria Manion
- Children: 9, including Gustave and William

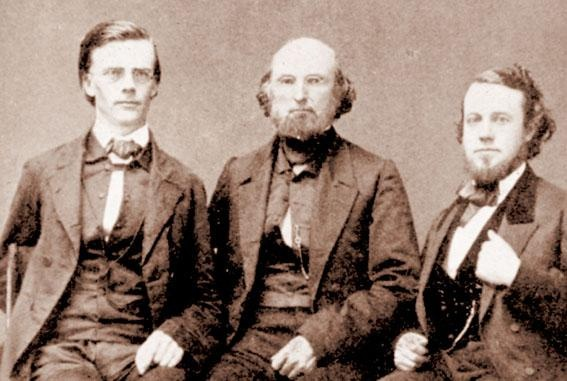
Guido Verbeck, Samuel Robbins Brown, Duane B. Simmons

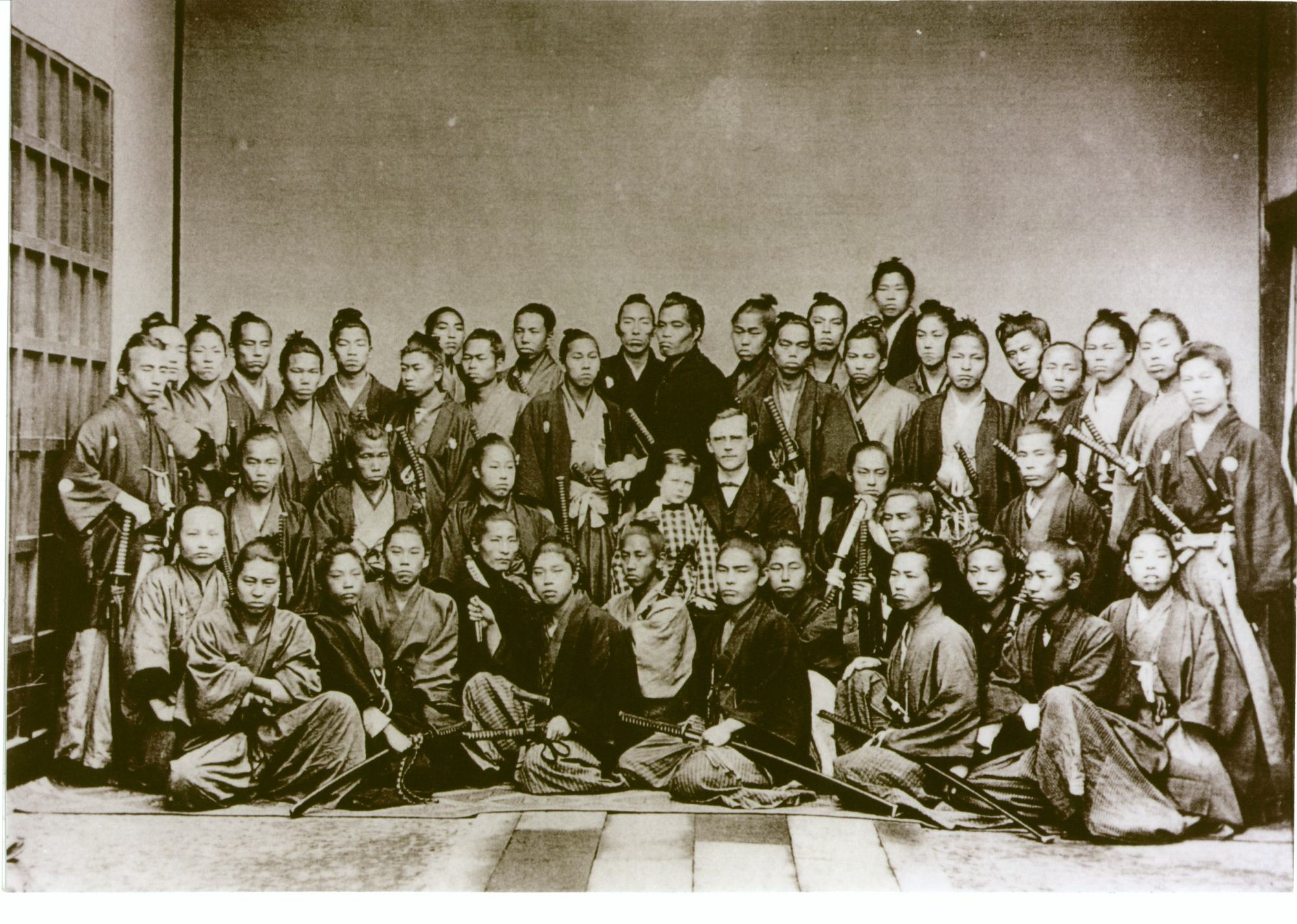
1868

Guido Herman Fridolin Verbeck (born Verbeek; 23 January 1830 – 10 March 1898) was a Dutch political advisor, educator, and missionary active in Bakumatsu and Meiji period Japan. He was one of the most important foreign advisors serving the Meiji government and contributed to many major government decisions during the early years of the reign of Emperor Meiji.

== Early years ==
Verbeck was born in Zeist, Netherlands, as the sixth of eight children in a Moravian family. As a young man he attended Dr. Grothe's technical high school in Utrecht in hopes of becoming an engineer. At Zeist he grew up speaking Dutch, German, French and English.

== Life in the United States ==
At the age of twenty-two, on the invitation of his brother-in-law, Verbeck traveled to the United States to work at a foundry located outside of Green Bay, Wisconsin, which had been developed by Moravian missionaries to build machinery for steamboats. Verbeck stayed in Wisconsin for almost a year, during which time he changed the spelling of his name from "Verbeek" to "Verbeck" in the hope that Americans could better pronounce it. However he wanted to see more of America and moved to Brooklyn, New York where his sister had previously lived. He then decided to work as a civil engineer in Arkansas, and designed bridges, structures and machines. However, in Arkansas he was deeply moved by the lives of slaves in the southern plantations, and the teachings of Henry Ward Beecher, the famed preacher whose sister was Harriet Beecher Stowe, writer of Uncle Tom's Cabin. After almost dying from cholera, he swore that he would become a missionary if he recovered. In 1855 he entered a seminary in Auburn, New York, where many Dutch had immigrated.

== Life in Japan ==
Verbeck graduated in 1859, and moved to Nagasaki as a missionary for the Dutch Reformed Church. Since housing in the foreign settlement had not yet been constructed, his first dwelling was at the Sōfuku-Temple (Sōfukuji), where Ranald MacDonald had previously stayed.

In 1862 Wakasa Murata, retainer of Nabeshima Naomasa, the 10th and final daimyō of Saga Domain in Hizen Province, sent three young men to study English with Verbeck, beginning a deep relation between Verbeck and the Saga domain.

Verbeck also taught foreign languages, politics, and science at the Yōgakusho (School for Western Studies) in Nagasaki, from August 1864. Initially he taught two hours a day, five days a week. Soon there were more than one hundred students at the school. Verbeck's pupils included Ōkuma Shigenobu, Itō Hirobumi, Ōkubo Toshimichi, Sagara Tomoyasu (Chian), and Soejima Taneomi. In 1865, French and Russian were added to the curriculum, and the school was renamed Gogakusho (Language School). In September of that same year the school was moved again and given the name Seibikan. Here, Verbeck taught both German and English classes. The texts that he preferably used were the American Declaration of Independence and the Constitution.

Verbeck cooperated with Takahashi Shinkichi to publish the Satsuma Dictionary. The first edition was printed by the American Presbyterian Mission Press in Shanghai. In 1873, a revised edition was printed in Tokyo.

In 1869, recommended by Ōkubo, Verbeck received an appointment as teacher at the Kaisei School (later Tokyo Imperial University). At one point, future Prime Minister Takahashi Korekiyo was a boarder at Verbeck's house.

Verbeck also served as a counselor of the Meiji government under Sanjō Sanetomi. In close cooperation with Sagara Tomoyasu (Chian), one of his former pupils, Verbeck recommended German medicine as a model for modern medical education and practice in Japan. He was also often consulted about the establishment of the prefectural system of local administration and influential in encouraging the dispatch of the Iwakura mission, the first Japanese diplomatic mission to the United States and Europe

In 1871 Verbeck assisted in bringing William Elliot Griffis of Rutgers University to Japan to teach at the Fukui Domain academy Meishinkan per the invitation of daimyo Matsudaira Norinaga.

In September 1871 the Ministry of Education was established and Verbeck became an advisor, providing inspiration for the Education Order of 1872 and the Conscription Ordinance of 1873.

As the ban of Christianity in Japan was lifted in February 1873, Verbeck was permitted to resume his missionary efforts.

Verbeck made a trip to Europe on 6 months' leave given by the Japanese government and traveled to meet up with the Iwakura Mission. On his return to Japan, he resigned from the university, and spent the next few years as a translator of English legal documents into Japanese.

In 1877, he taught at the Gakushuin, and was appointed the first trustee of Meiji Gakuin University in 1886.

In 1887, Verbeck translated the Old Testament Psalms and Book of Isaiah into Japanese.

Verbeck attempted to return to the United States in 1890 with his daughter, but was refused by the American government, as he could not prove his Dutch nationality and his application for American nationality based on his previous stay in the United States was denied. The Japanese government responded by granting Verbeck permanent residency and issuing him a passport.

Verbeck died in Tokyo of a heart attack in 1898 and was buried in the foreign section of the Aoyama Cemetery in central Tokyo.

== Descendants ==
Guido and Maria had six sons and three daughters. His son Gustave emigrated to the United States and gained some fame as a newspaper cartoonist. Another son, William, was Adjutant General of the State of New York, and head of the Manlius School, near Syracuse, New York. His grandson, Guido Verbeck III served in the army. His great grandson, Guido Verbeck IV, is, as of 2012, a professor of chemistry at the University of North Texas.

== Honors ==
- Order of the Rising Sun
