= Sand Beach Church =

Historic church in New York, United States

- U.S. National Register of Historic Places
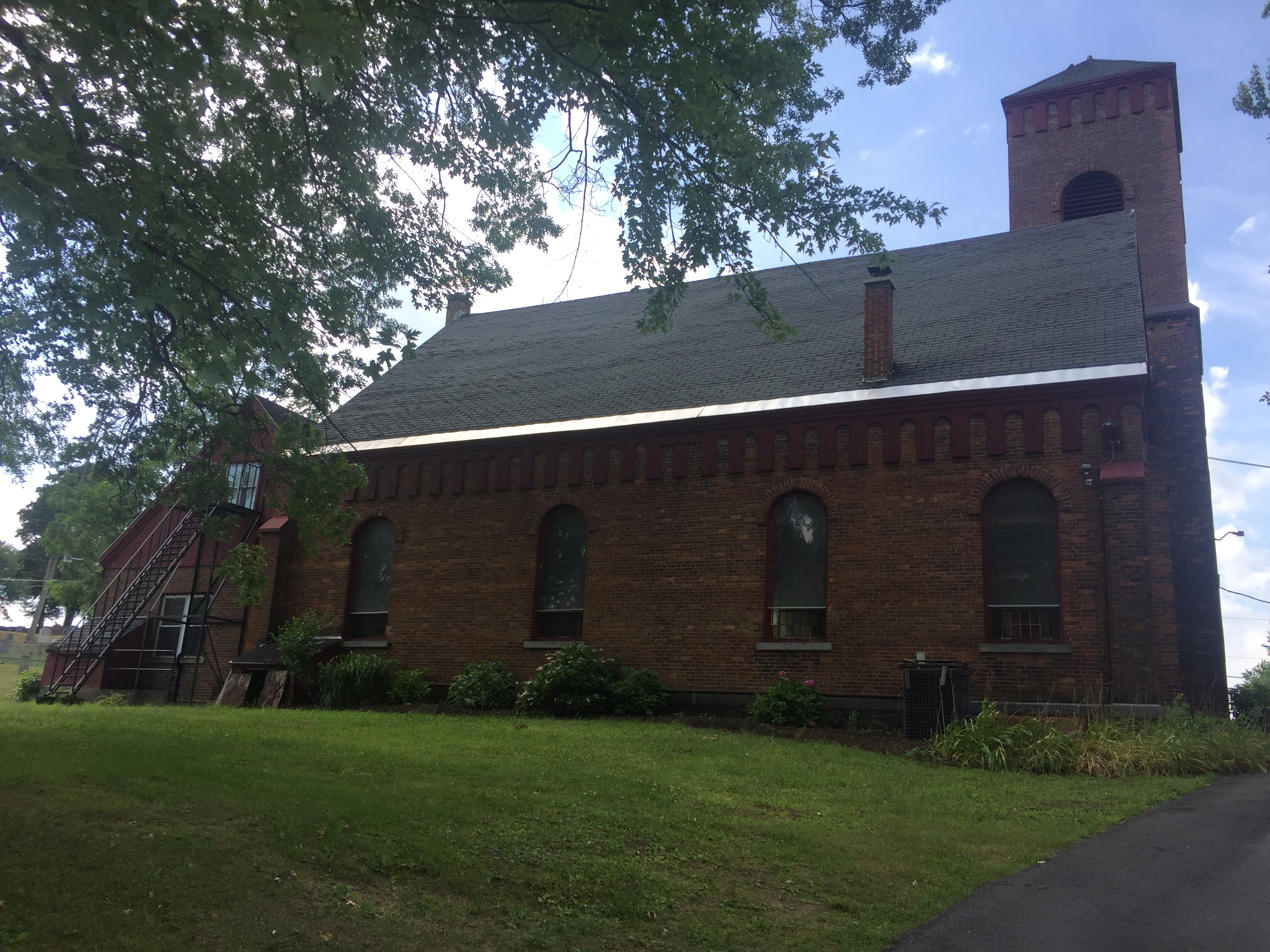
- Building in 2022

- Location within New York Location within the United States
- Nearest city: Auburn, New York
- Coordinates: 42.90337°N 76.54704°W
- Area: 3 acres (1.2 ha)
- Built: 1854
- Architectural style: Neo-Romanesque
- NRHP reference No.: 75001176
- Added to NRHP: June 10, 1975

Sand Beach Church is a historic Reformed Church church located in the Town of Fleming near Auburn in Cayuga County, New York. It is a vernacular Romanesque Revival style brick structure built in 1854–1855 on the site of an earlier 1807 frame church. The church features a square bell tower that once stood 82 feet high, but was modified to its present form after a fire in 1935. The former church building was purchased by Sean Lattimore on August 3, 2007, for use by the nearby Springside Inn Restaurant. Adjacent to the church is a cemetery with burials dating to the early 19th century. On August 17, 1978; all of the assets of the Owasco Lake Cemetery Association, including both the former Sand Beach Cemetery and adjacent Owasco Lake Cemetery land parcels, were deeded to become owned by the Town of Fleming NY. Noted missionary Samuel Robbins Brown (1810–1880) served as pastor from 1851 to 1859 and in 1867 upon his return from Japan.

It was listed on the National Register of Historic Places in 1975.
