= Neal Lawrence =

American diplomat

Neal Henry Lawrence, OSB wearing the robe of a Benedictine monk and the badge of the Order of the Rising Sun, which was conferred in 1993.

Neal Henry Lawrence OSB (22 January 1908 – 3 November 2004) was a naval officer, a diplomat, a monk, and academic/scholar and a poet. The chronology of his life comprises aspects of several disparate life stories.

== Early years ==
William Henry Lawrence Jr., was born in Clarksville, Tennessee, to William Henry and Sallie (Neblett) Lawrence. His preparatory education in Louisville, Kentucky was completed in 1922. His undergraduate years at Harvard College in Cambridge, Massachusetts led to an A.B. in English in 1929. After college Neal worked for 15 years as an executive at Lever Brothers, which was then located in Cambridge.

== War years and aftermath ==
In 1943, he was commissioned as a Lieutenant Commander in the U.S. Navy. As Officer-in-Charge of the Supply Depot at Norfork, Virginia in 1943–1944, he oversaw all contracts for supplies at advance bases and ships. He moved to the front in 1945. Lawrence participated in the siege of Okinawa, landing with the US Marines in April 1945.

=== Military government ===
When the war ended, he became Director of the Department of Economic Affairs for the Military Governmental Headquarters of the Ryukyu Islands from 1946 to 1947. Further study led to a master's degree in Public Law and Government which was awarded by Columbia University in 1947.

=== Diplomacy ===
Lawrence was assigned to the diplomatic section of occupation headquarters in Tokyo. As it happened, he was the first American diplomat to visit Hiroshima and Nagasaki officially. In 1949, he was assigned as director of the United States Information Service in Singapore and Malaya. In 1951, he was transferred temporarily to Taiwan; and he retired from government service in 1952.

== Monastic Vocation ==
In 1954, Brother Neal was accepted into the Benedictine novitiate at Saint John's Abbey. He took vows as a Benedictine monk in 1955. During this period, Brother Neal taught in the Political Science Department of Saint John's University. After ordination in 1960, he was sent him to Saint Anselm's Priory and Parish in Tokyo. Father Neal served as associate pastor and pastor of St. Anselm's Parish for 33 years from 1966 to 1999. When the religious community relocated to Trinity Monastery at Fujimi, Father Neal went with them.

=== Academic service ===
Father Neal taught a variety of courses at Tokyo University until mandatory retirement at 60. He continued to teach at Keio University, Seikei University, Sophia University and Shirayuri Women's University until he was 75. In this period, he served as president of the Association of Foreign Teachers (1964–1971); and he was a member of the Board of Directors of the Harvard Club in Japan, a member of the Council of the America-Japan Society of Tokyo and as one of the vice presidents of the Asiatic Society of Japan.

In 1975 Father Neal began to write tanka poetry in English; and he published four books of tanka.

== Honors ==
- 1993 -- Order of the Rising Sun, Golden rays with rosette.
- 2002 -- Asiatic Society of Japan, Patron's Award for Distinguished Scholarship and Service.

== Select works ==
- 1993 -- Shining moments: Tanka poems in English. Gualala, California: AHA Books. ISBN 978-0-944676-39-4; OCLC 29360276
- 1997 -- Okinawa: Battle and Regeneration. Tokyo: Asiatic Society of Japan. OCLC 61770857
