= Samuel Robbins Brown =

American missionary to China and Japan

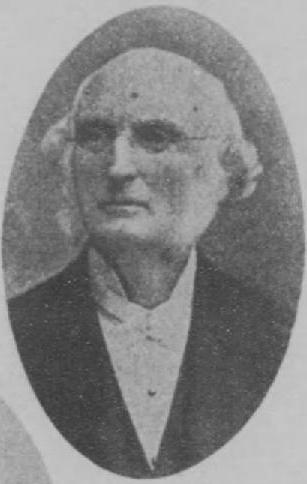
- Rev. Samuel Robbins Brown
- Born: June 16, 1810; East Windsor, Connecticut
- Died: June 20, 1880 (aged 70); Stockbridge, Massachusetts
- Known for: Christian Missionary to China and Japan

Rev. Samuel Robbins Brown D.D. (June 16, 1810 – June 20, 1880) was an American missionary to China and Japan with the Reformed Church in America.

== Birth and education ==
Brown was born in East Windsor, Connecticut. He graduated from Yale College in 1832, studied theology in Columbia, South Carolina and as a member of the first graduating class of Union Theological Seminary, and taught for four years (1834–38) at the New York Institution for the Deaf and Dumb.

== China ==
In 1838, he went to Guangzhou and opened, for the Morrison Education Society, the first Protestant School in the Chinese Empire—a school in which were taught Yung Wing and other pupils who afterward came to the United States. The several annual reports on this school were published in The Chinese Repository for 1840 to 1846, to which he contributed some of his papers on Chinese subjects.

== Return to America ==
After nine years' service, his wife's health failing, Brown returned to the United States and became a pastor at Sand Beach Church and teacher of boys at Owasco Outlet, near Auburn (1851–59). He worked for the formation of a college for women, which was situated first in Auburn and then in Elmira, New York and now known as Elmira College. Brown was responsible for sponsoring Yung Wing (1828–1912); the first Chinese student to graduate from a U.S. university, graduating from Yale College in 1854.

== Japan ==
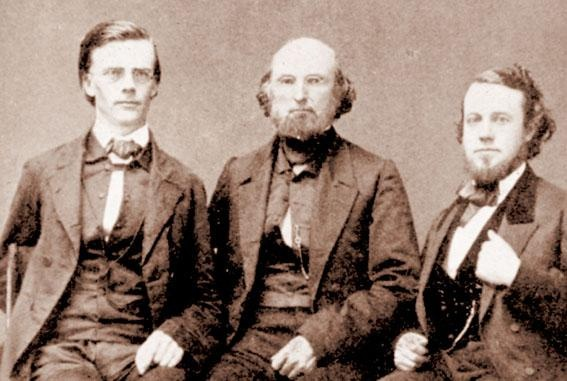
Guido Verbeck, Samuel Robbins Brown, and Duane B. Simmons

When by the Harris Treaty of 1858, Kanagawa and Nagasaki in Japan were opened to trade and residence, Brown sailed for the former, arriving on November 3, 1859. On arrival, Brown shared residential accommodation with the family of the Presbyterian medical missionary Dr. James Curtis Hepburn, then residing at Jobutsuji in Kanagawa, a dilapidated temple formerly occupied by the Dutch consulate.

Brown and Hepburn, both benefiting from the experience of living and working in China, were noted pioneers in the study of the Japanese language. In collaboration with Dr. Hepburn and others, Brown made substantial contributions to the translation of the New Testament into Japanese. Brown was also a gifted teacher, Ernest Satow, then a student interpreter at the British legation, who many years later became British Consul to Japan, described the Japanese language lessons received from Brown to be, "of the greatest value."

Brown began presiding at Christian ecumenical religious services held at the Jobutsuji in Kanagawa from the second Sunday after his arrival in November 1859. In July 1860, at the request of English-speaking merchants in Yokohama, Brown begun to preach regularly at Sunday morning service that attracted 30 to 40 congregants each week.

In 1861 Brown also contributed to drawing up the plans and specifications for the British Anglican Garrison Church built on Lot 105 in the foreign settlement. The Garrison Church, also known as Christ Church, was the forerunner of Christ Church, Yokohama, rebuilt in 1901 on a prominent position on the Bluff overlooking the Port of Yokohama. On Lot 167 in the heart of the Kannai commercial district, Brown was also able to establish a Reformed Church, later named in 1872 as Union Church, Yokohama.

At Yokohama, Brown also opened a school in which hundreds of young men, afterwards leaders in various walks of life, were educated. Brown acted as honorary chaplain to the United States legation, teaching and preaching for over 20 years. He was one of the founders of the Asiatic Society of Japan and a prominent contributor to early Meiji Period higher education.

Following a fire that destroyed much of his home, personal library, manuscripts, and notes, Brown returned to the United States for a two-year furlough in May 1867. In June of the same year he was awarded an honorary Doctorate in Divinity by New York University.

Brown returned to Japan in 1869, arriving at Yokohama on August 26, to take up a new position as principal of a government funded school in Niigata. The Niigata sojourn was only brief; desiring to be close to his fellow New Testament translators, Brown accepted a new teaching post and relocated back to Yokohama in 1870.

Brown, suffering from ill health, left Japan for the United States in the Autumn of 1879.

== Death ==
Brown died during his sleep, while visiting an old friend in Stockbridge, Massachusetts, and is buried at Monson, Massachusetts, his boyhood home.

== Bibliography ==
- William Elliot Griffis, A Maker of the New Orient (New York: F.H. Revell, 1902) Internet Archive Etext

=== Works ===
- Colloquial Japanese (1863), a grammar, phrase book, and vocabulary
- Prendergast's Mastery System Adapted to the Japanese
- translation of Arai Hakuseki's Sei Yo Ki Bun: or, Annals of the Western Ocean
