= Harry Newton Redman =

American composer and painter

Harry Newton Redman (December 26, 1869 - December 26, 1958) was an American composer, writer, and artist, born in Mount Carmel, Illinois. He wrote mainly chamber music, including five string quartets, and some songs. He was also active as a painter, and wrote a musical dictionary.

He studied under George Chadwick at the New England Conservatory. Chadwick hired him as a professor in piano and composition in 1898, a position he held until his retirement in 1940. He became a member of the Handel and Haydn Society in 1890. Jesús María Sanromá and Elliot Griffis were among his students.

His music was first commercially recorded in 2013. There is an extant recording of an excerpt of his Creole String Quartet from a 1938 broadcast played by the Forum String Quartet of Boston for the "Works Progress Administration Presents" radio programs, part of the Federal Music Project.

During the 1900s he amassed a large collection of American Impressionist art, including works by Edmnund Tarbell, Willard Metcalf, Charles Davis, George Lorenzo Noyes, William McGregor Paxton, and Louis Kronberg. Samuel Burtis Baker painted his portrait. He began painting in the 1920s; his own paintings were exhibited throughout the U.S. northeast during and after his life, including at the 1930 Carnegie International. In 1933 the Museum of Fine Arts purchased his landscape The Ridge. In a Redman exhibit at the Childs Gallery a few years after his death, Boston Globe art critic noted: "Redman's was a personal art, blending with real fascination the sophisticated theorist and the technically naieve."

== Selected compositions ==
- Two Pieces for organ, op. 7 (Pastorale, Prelude and Fugue)
- Album of 14 songs for high voice (published 1903 by White, Smith, & Co)
  - When Stars are in the Quiet Skies
  - Ask Me No More
  - The Two Rivers
  - Weep not!
  - To Daphne
  - A Vain Desire
  - If Only Thou Art True
  - If Love were what the Rose Is
  - A Little Dutch Garden
  - At Twilight
  - Heaven
  - April-tide
  - If I But Knew
  - O Let Me Die A-Singing
- Sonata for Violin and Piano in C minor, op. 16 (published 1903 by White, Smith, & Co)
- Sonata for Violin and Piano in D, op. 17
- The Disappointed Snow-Flakes, song
- Eileen aroon, song
- String Quartet "Creole"
- The Pleasure Dome of Kubla Kahn, song

== Textbooks ==
- A Pronouncing Dictionary of Musical Terms, Boston, Knight & Millet (1901)
- Redman's Musical Dictionary and Pronouncing Guide, Theodore Presser Company (1910)
