= Charles Dickinson West =

Anglo-Irish engineer (1847–1908)

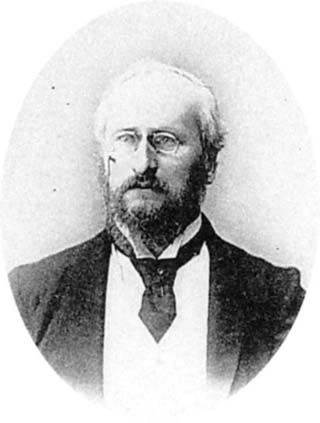
- Born: January 1847; Dublin, Ireland
- Died: 10 January 1908 (aged 60–61); Atami, Shizuoka, Japan
- Occupations: engineer, educator, foreign advisor to Japan
- Known for: Foreign advisor to Meiji Japan

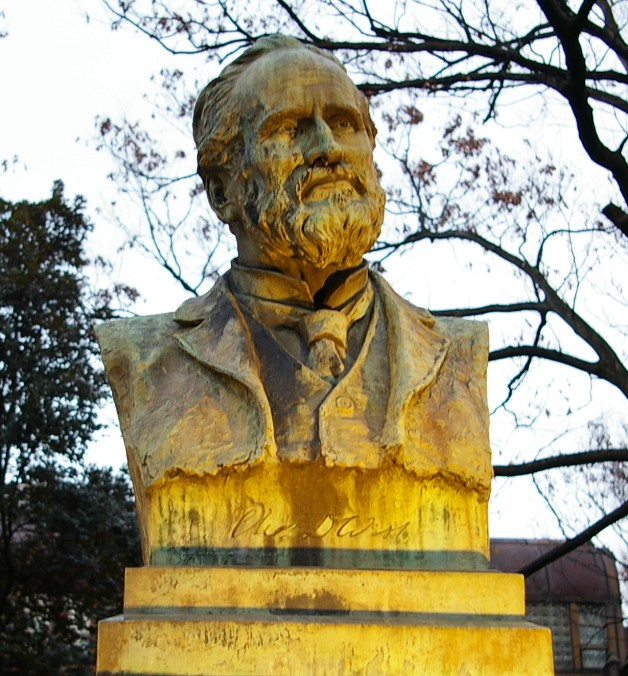
Bronze bust of Charles Dickinson West at Tokyo University

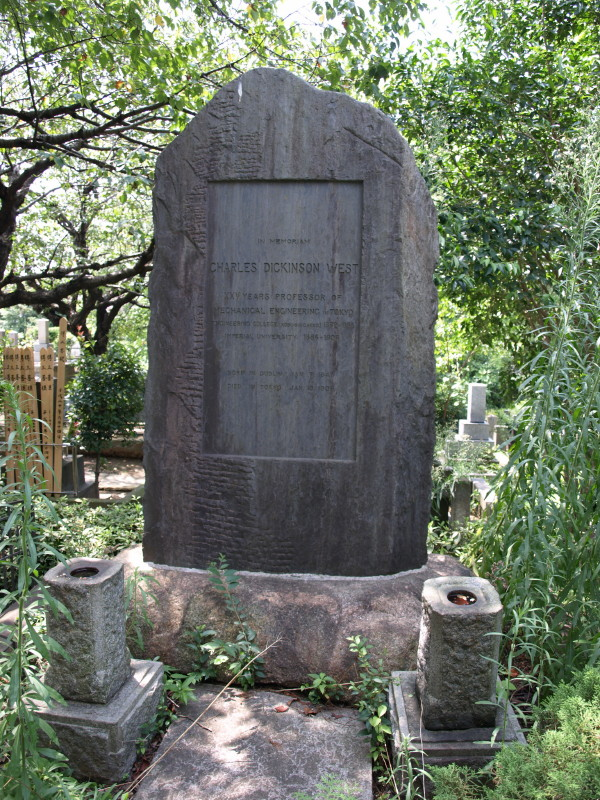
The grave of Charles Dickinson West in Aoyama Cemetery

Charles Dickinson West (January 1847 – 10 January 1908) was an Irish mechanical engineer and naval architect, who worked for many years at the Imperial College of Engineering, in Meiji era Japan.

== Biography ==
West was born in Dublin, Ireland as the eldest son of The Very Reverend John West, Dean of St Patrick's Cathedral, Dublin, and graduated with a degree in civil engineering from Trinity College Dublin in 1869. He worked at Bergenhead Steel Company in Great Britain for five years, followed by positions in other forms where he gained experience in shipbuilding, steel mills and steam power.

In 1882, West was hired by the Meiji government of the Empire of Japan as a foreign advisor, to teach steam engine mechanics, mechanical drawing, engineering, and mechanical engineering. He replaced Henry Dyer at the Kobu Daigakko, the forerunner of the Imperial College of Engineering of Tokyo Imperial University. He held the position of professor of Mechanical Engineering and Naval Architecture, until his death 25 years later.

While in Japan, he assisted the Naval Architectural Department of the Imperial Japanese Navy. He also served as an advisor to several Japanese shipyards, including Mitsubishi, Kawasaki and Osaka Iron Works.

West remained a bachelor all his life. His hobbies included boating and photography, and his large collection of photographs is preserved at the Tokyo University library. Many of his diaries and manuscripts are also preserved, including lecture notes and examination problems given to his students. During his entire stay in Japan, West returned to Europe only once. He was awarded the Order of the Rising Sun by Emperor Meiji in 1905 for his contribution to higher education in engineering in Japan.

During a winter stay at Atami hot springs resort in 1907, West caught pneumonia and died shortly after in the University of Tokyo Hospital on 10 January 1908. He is buried in Aoyama Cemetery in Tokyo. A monument with his bronze bust was unveiled on the main campus of Tokyo University on 19 March 1910.

== See also ==
- Ireland–Japan relations
- Mechanical Engineering Heritage (Japan) No.100 in 2020
