= Sagara Tomoyasu =

Dutch-trained Japanese physician

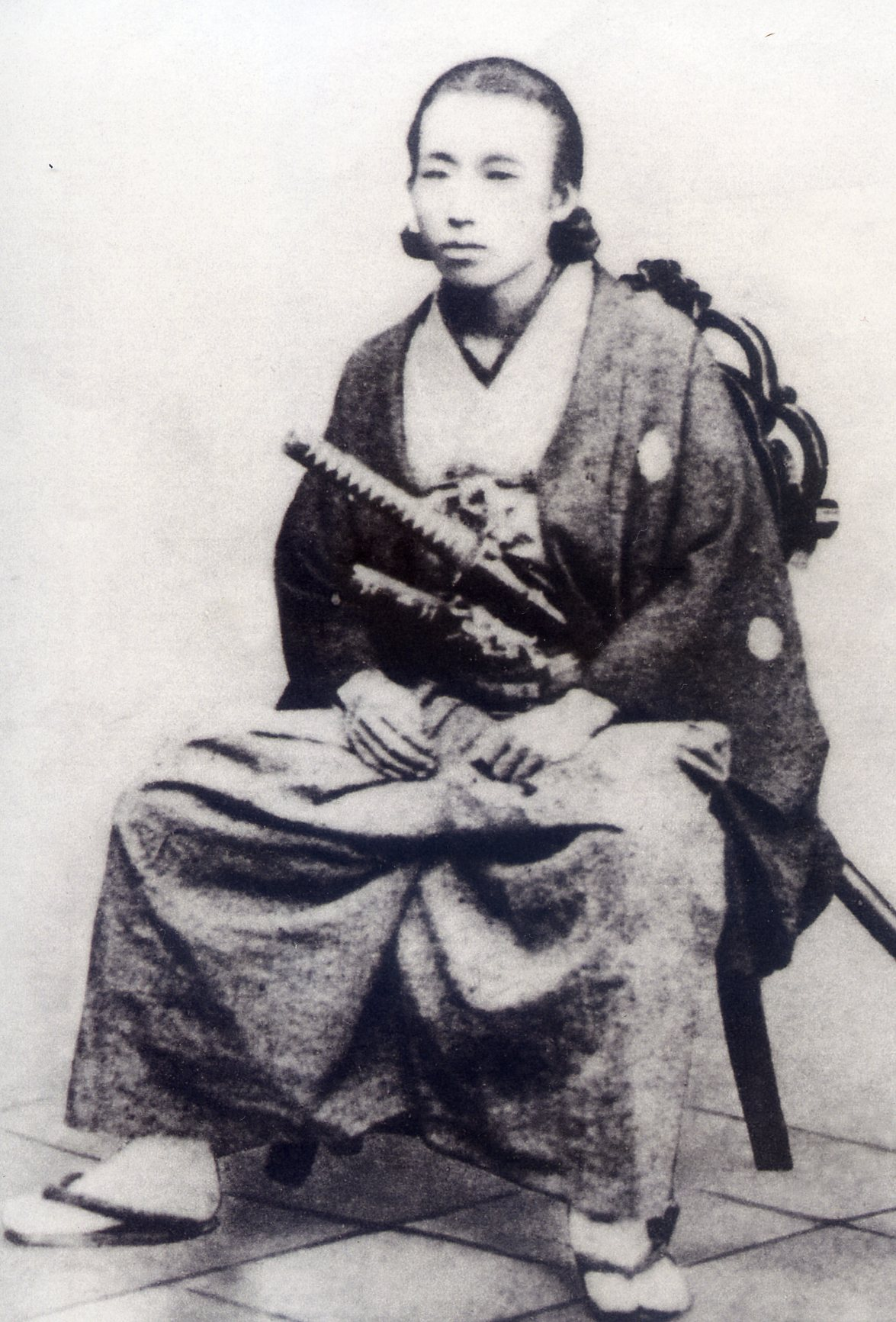
Sagara Chian in Nagasaki

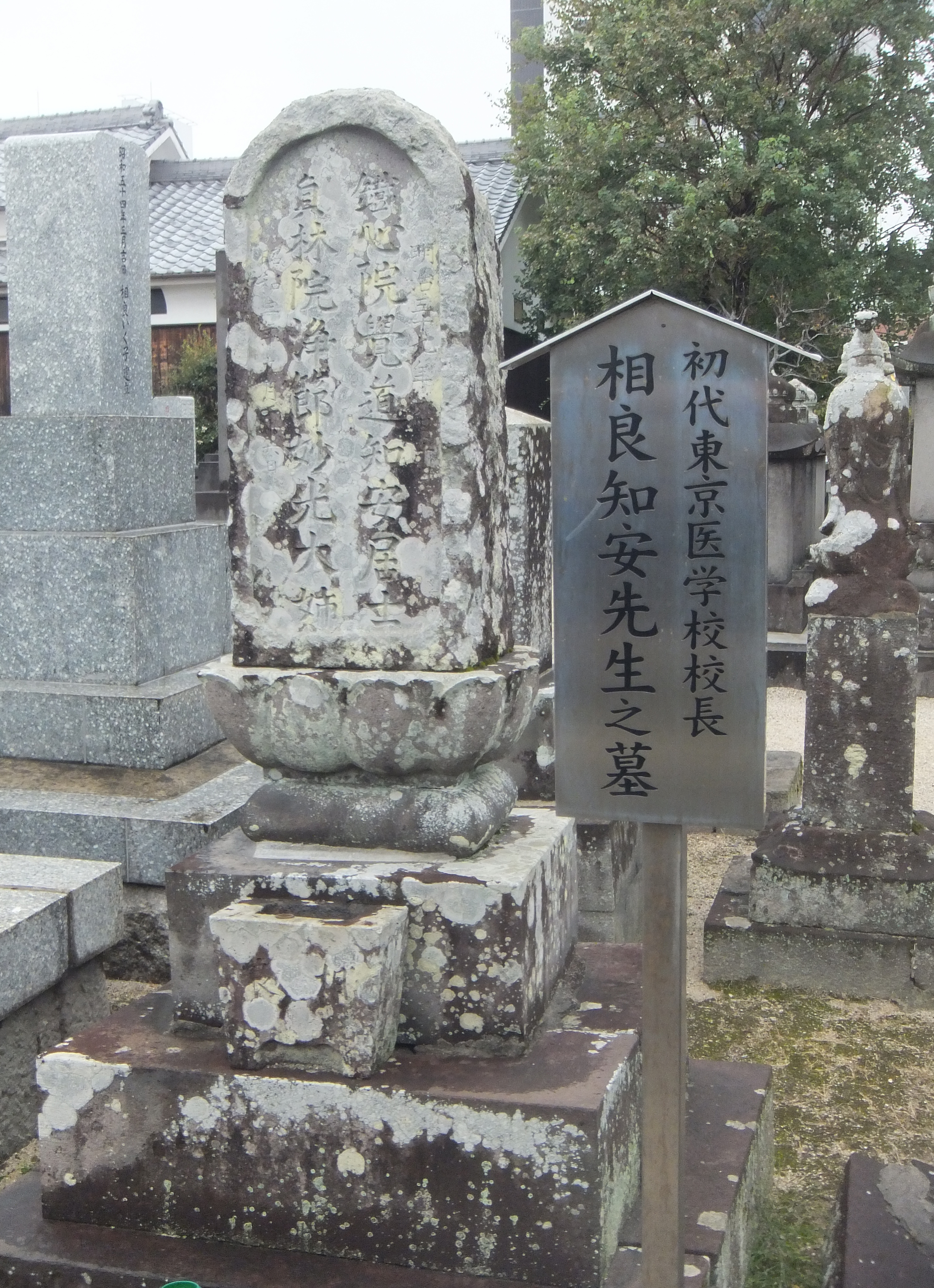
Sagara Chian‘s grave (Jōun-Temple, Saga)

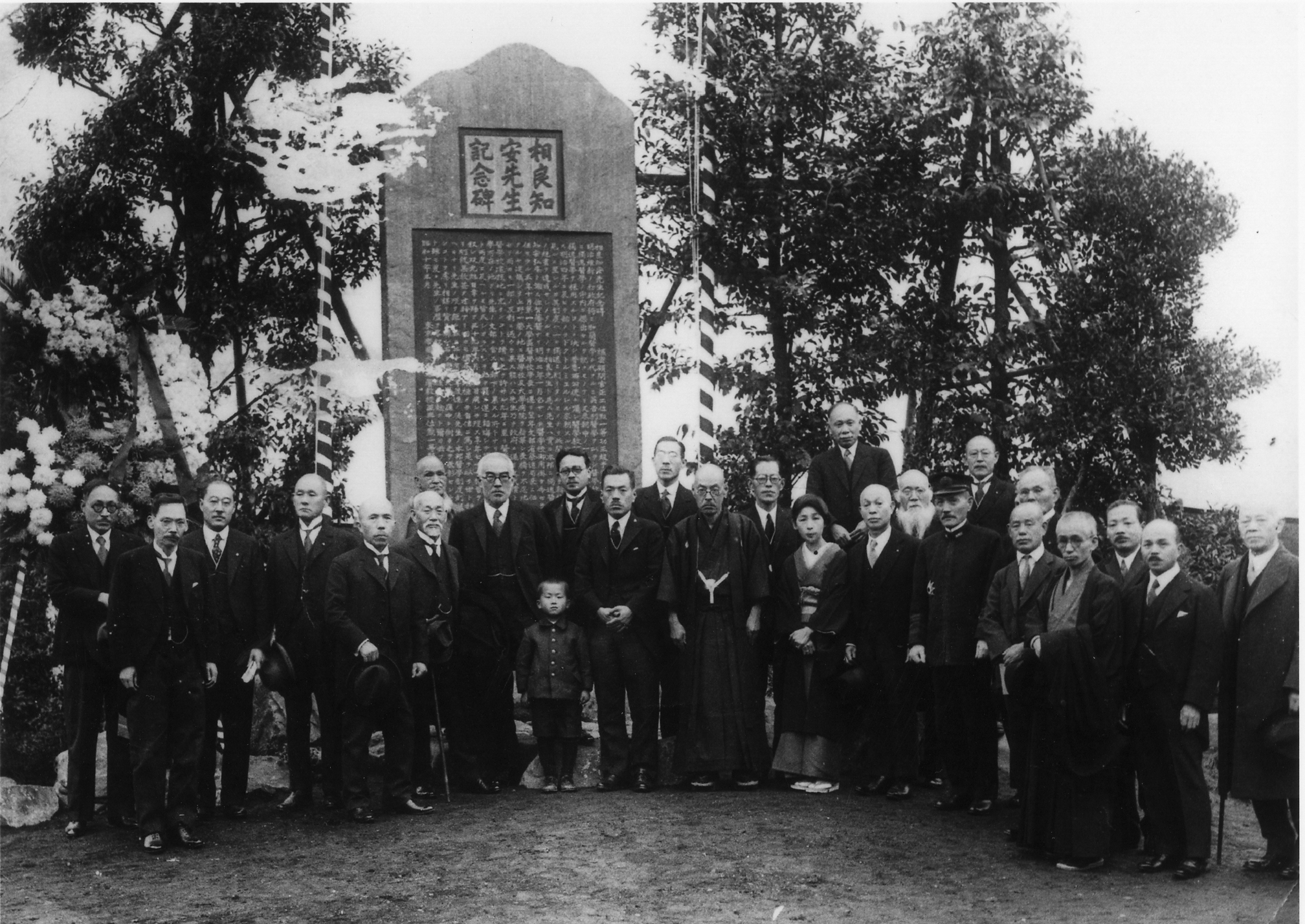
Inauguration ceremony for the Sagara Memorial (Tokyo University, 1935)

Sagara Tomoyasu (相良 知安, 1836–1906) was the third son of a surgeon in the feudal domain Saga (nowadays Saga Prefecture), Japan. Among his childhood friends was Etō Shimpei (1834–1874) who lived nearby and also became one of the influential figures of the Meiji Restoration.

== Early life ==
After receiving an education in traditional disciplines and Dutch-style medicine in local domain institutions, Sagara was dispatched to Nagasaki where he continued his medical studies under the Dutch doctor Anthonius Franciscus Bauduin (1820–1885) and was taught English by the Dutch-American missionary Guido Verbeck.

== Medical career ==
After the resignation of the last shōgun the Meiji government took control over the medical institutions of the Tokugawa regime and assigned Sagara Chian and Iwasa Jun from Echizen to draft a program for the new system of medical care and education. In 1870 Sagara recommended Germany as the model for Japan's medical modernization. After heavy struggles with proponents of British medicine, Sagara's concept was adopted, and in 1871 the first two German teachers (Benjamin Karl Leopold Müller and Theodor Eduard Hoffmann) arrived in Yokohama. For several years Sagara was involved in medical administration as chief of the Medical Affairs Bureau in the Ministry of Education. He also served as the head of Tokyo Medical School No. 1 that later became the Medical Faculty of the University of Tokyo.

== Death in poverty ==
He died alone from influenza in 1906. His grave is at the Jōun Temple (Jōun-in) in Saga.

== Monuments ==
A monument honoring Sagara was raised at the University of Tokyo in 1935. Its inscription was drafted by Ishiguro Tadanori, a physician in the Imperial Japanese Army.

== Literature ==
- Kagiyama Sakae, Sagara Chian. Tōkyō: Nihon ko-igaku shiryō sentā, 1973.
- Sagara Takahiro, Saga-han-i Sagara Chian to doitsu igaku. In: Nihon Ishigaku Zasshi. Vol. 55, No. 2, 2009, pp. 135–8.
- Shinoda Tatsuaki, Shiroi gekiryū – Meiji no ikan Sagara Chian no shōgai. Tōkyō: Shinjinbutsu ōraisha, 1997.
