= Elliot Griffis =

American composer (1893–1967)

John Elliot Griffis (January 28, 1893 – 1967) was an American composer.

Born in Boston, the son of the noted Orientalist William Elliot Griffis, he attended public schools in Ithaca, New York, as well as The Manlius School before going to Ithaca College. He went to Yale University to work with Horatio Parker from 1913 until 1915, and studied at the New England Conservatory of Music with Daniel Gregory Mason, Harry Newton Redman, and George Whitefield Chadwick before serving in the United States Army. In 1931, he was awarded a Pulitzer Fellowship for his String Quartet in C Major. (This was twelve years before the Pulitzer Prize for Music was first awarded in 1943.)

Griffis taught at Grinnell College, the Westchester Conservatory of Music and the St. Louis Conservatory of Music before settling in Los Angeles. Much of his output was chamber music, especially piano pieces and songs; he did, however, compose some works for orchestra and one opera, 1963's The Port of Pleasure. He died in 1967 and is buried at Vale Cemetery in Schenectady, New York.
