= Duayne Hatchett =

American visual artist

- Born: May 12, 1925; Shawnee, Oklahoma
- Died: September 7, 2015 (aged 90)

Duayne Hatchett (May 12, 1925 — September 7, 2015) was an American sculptor, painter, and printmaker.

== Biography ==
Hatchett was born on May 12, 1925, in Shawnee, Oklahoma.

Hatchett taught printmaking at Oklahoma City University 1951 to 1954. He taught sculpture at Tulsa University from 1954 to 1964. He taught at Ohio State University from 1964 to 1967.

== Works ==
• Rainbow
