= Griffis Sculpture Park =

Sculpture park in New York State, US

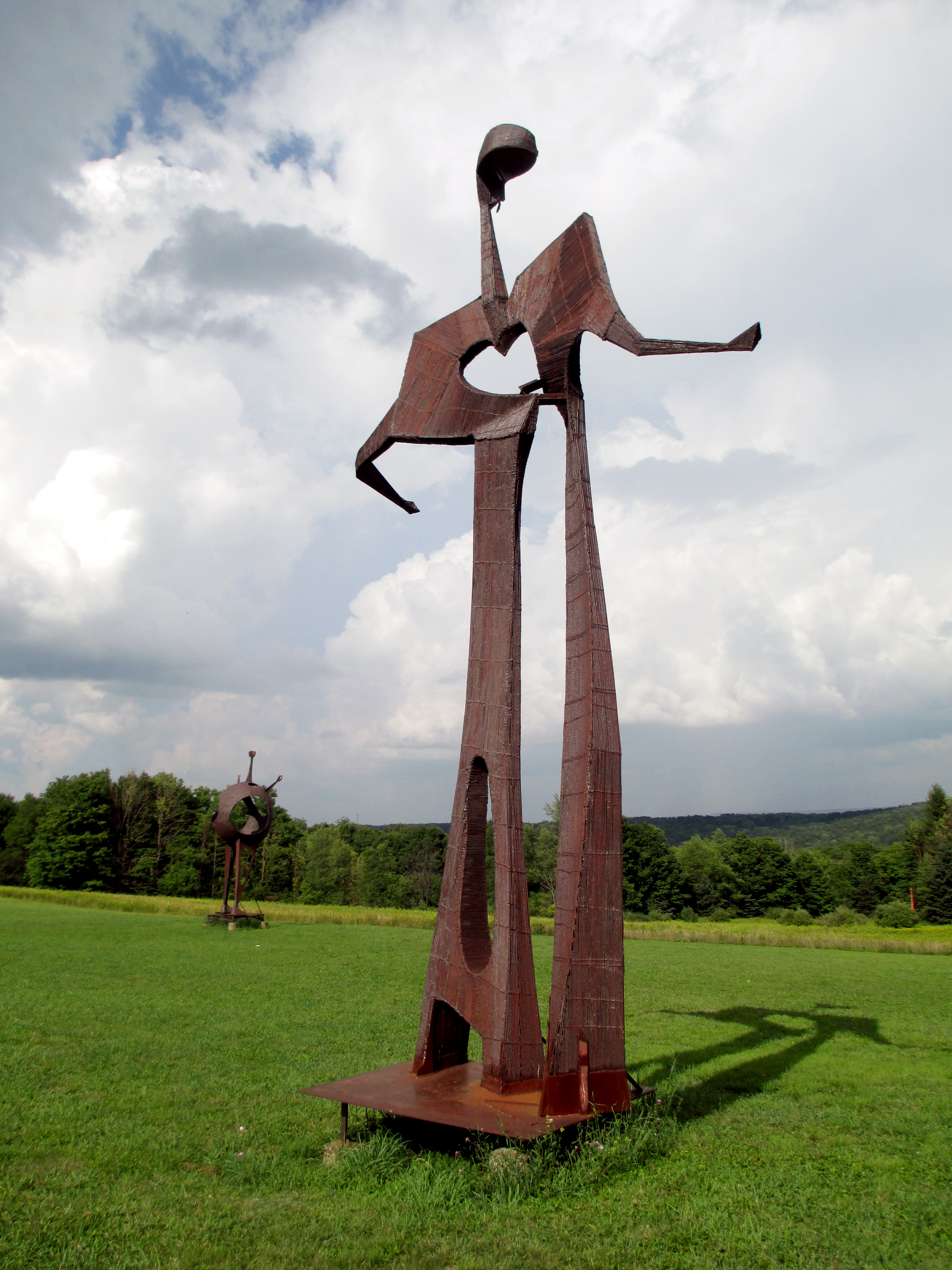
- Sculptures by Larry W. Griffis Jr at Griffis Sculpture Park's Rohr Hill Road section

- Location within New York
- Type: Sculpture park
- Location: 6902 Mill Valley Road; East Otto, New York
- Coordinates: 42°22′12″N 78°41′29″W
- Area: 425 acres (1.72 km^{2})
- Created: 1966
- Operator: Ashford Hollow Foundation for the Visual and Performing Arts
- Open: May to October
- Website: www.griffispark.org

Griffis Sculpture Park is a sculpture park located between Ashford Hollow and East Otto in Cattaraugus County, New York. The 425-acre (1.72 km^{2}) outdoor art museum, which was created by artist Larry W. Griffis Jr in 1966, was the first sculpture park in the United States. It features more than 250 works of art created by over 100 artists, and also serves as a nature preserve, with 10 miles (16 km) of trails. Griffis founded the Ashford Hollow Foundation for the Visual and Performing Arts to administer the park, which was most recently headed by Simon Griffis, son of Larry Griffis, until Simon's death at Zoar Valley in June 2010. Other members of the Griffis family have also served on the AHF board of directors.

The park draws 35,000 visitors annually. Admission is $5 per person, which is paid on a volunteer basis with QR codes (PayPal or Venmo) scannable near the entrance to the park. The park is also supported by private donations and fund raisers. The park is open from May to October.

== History ==
The idea for an outdoor sculpture museum came to artist Larry Griffis while he was touring Italy with his family. While watching his children play on the ruins of Emperor Hadrian’s villa, Griffis realized the value of interactive art. As Simon Griffis recalls, his father said, "This is absolutely remarkable. Look at my kids. I've taken them to the finest museums and galleries but they've come alive in this environment where they can interact and they can smell the flowers and they can touch things."

Upon returning to the United States, Larry Griffis looked at many possible sites for the park, but had a vision that included site-specific terrain. He required a combination of valleys, woods, lake and open space. Kissing Bridge Ski Resort in Concord and Lewiston's ArtPark were possible candidates for the vision, but were passed over by the artist.

In 1966, Griffis purchased 100 acres (0.40 km^{2}) near Ashford Hollow in the Southern Tier of Western New York and placed 15 of his own 25 feet (7.6 m) welded steel works on a hillside along a country road. The Ashford Hollow Foundation acquired another 325 acres (1.32 km^{2}) and drummed up commissions for additional sculptures.

== Art ==
More than 100 local, national and international artists have contributed to this park, although much of the art features members of the Griffis family. Other artist include Bolinski, Bellavia, Dwain, Gerst, Hatchett, Patterson, Mehrdad Hadighi, and Lauren Scime. The sculptures are cast in bronze, welded steel, aluminum and wood, and are arranged in twelve groups based on theme. These groups include various oversized animals and insects, life-size nudes (men and women), or sets such as castles or submarines.
