= James Curtis Hepburn =

American physician, educator and phonologist (1815–1911)

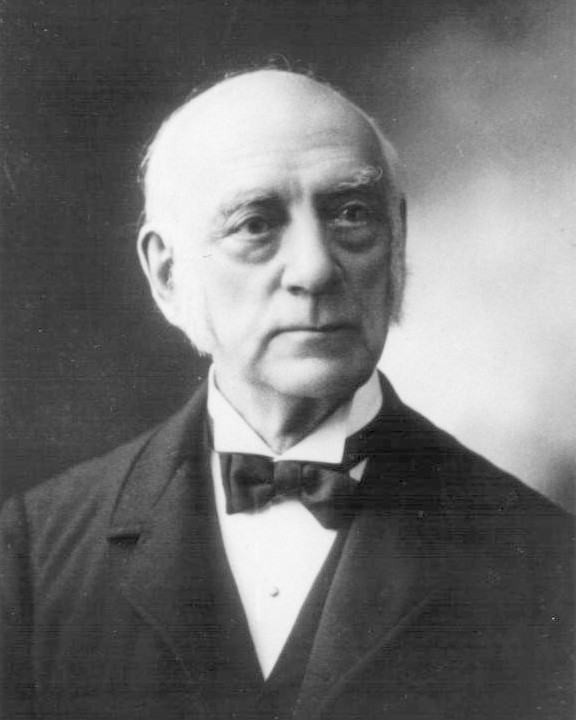
- Born: March 13, 1815; Milton, Pennsylvania, U.S.
- Died: September 21, 1911 (aged 96); East Orange, New Jersey, U.S.
- Education: Princeton University; University of Pennsylvania
- Known for: Medical missions in China and Japan; Hepburn romanization system

James Curtis Hepburn (/ˈhɛpbərn/; March 13, 1815 – September 21, 1911) was an American physician, educator, translator and lay Christian missionary. He is known for the Hepburn romanization system for transliteration of the Japanese language into the Latin alphabet, which he popularized in his Japanese–English dictionary.

== Background and early life ==
Hepburn was born in Milton, Pennsylvania, on March 13, 1815. He attended Princeton University, where he earned a master's degree, then attended the University of Pennsylvania, where he received his M.D. degree in 1836, and became a physician. He decided to go to China as a medical missionary, but had to stay in Singapore for two years because the First Opium War was underway and Chinese ports were closed to foreigners. After five years as a missionary, he returned to the United States in 1845 and opened a medical practice in New York City.

== Missionary work in Japan ==
In 1859, Hepburn went to Japan as a medical missionary with the American Presbyterian Mission. After first arriving in Nagasaki in October 1859, Hepburn swiftly relocated to the newly opened treaty port of Yokohama, opening his first clinic in April 1861 at the Sōkōji Temple. Initially residing at Jōbutsuji in Kanagawa, a dilapidated temple formerly occupied by the Dutch consulate, Hepburn was the first Christian missionary to take up residence close to the newly opened treaty port. Hepburn's family shared accommodation at Jobutsuji with Dutch Reformed minister Rev. Samuel Robbins Brown and all were quickly absorbed into the local foreign community, Hepburn being appointed honorary physician to the US Consul, Townsend Harris.

Hepburn's first clinic failed as the Bakumatsu authorities, wanting the missionaries to relocate to Yokohama, put pressure on patients to stop going to it. In the spring of 1862, Hepburn and his family relocated to the house and compound at Kyoryūchi No. 39, in the heart of the foreigners residential district in the treaty port of Yokohama. There, in addition to his clinic, he and his wife Clara founded the Hepburn School, which eventually developed into Meiji Gakuin University. Hepburn's Japanese pupils included Furuya Sakuzaemon, Takahashi Korekiyo, Okakura Kakuzō, and Numa Morikazu.

For his medical contributions to the city of Yokohama, Hepburn Hall was named in his honor on the campus of Yokohama City University School of Medicine.

In May 1867, with the collaboration of his long-time assistant Kishida Ginkō, Hepburn published a Japanese–English dictionary which rapidly became the standard reference work for prospective students of Japanese. In the dictionary's third edition, published in 1886, Hepburn adopted a new system for romanization of the Japanese language developed by the Society for the Romanization of the Japanese Alphabet (Rōmajikai). This system is widely known as the Hepburn romanization because Hepburn's dictionary popularized it. Hepburn also contributed to the translation of the Bible into Japanese.

== Later years ==
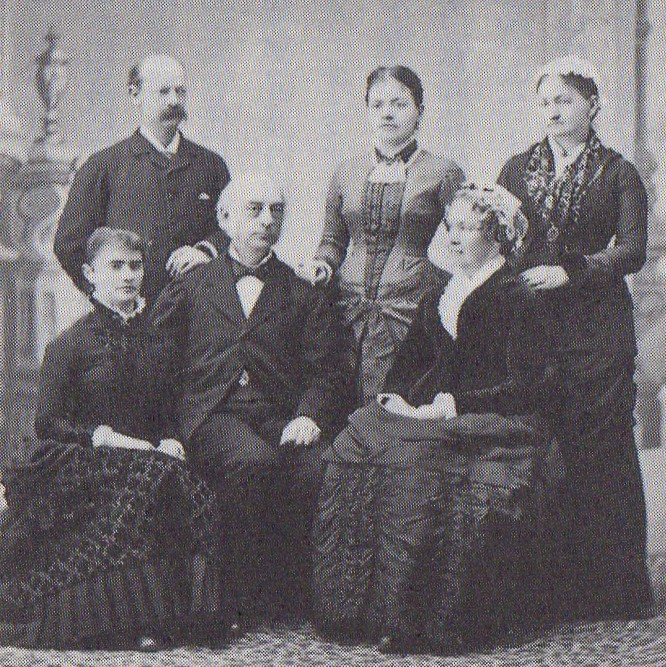
Hepburn and his family in Japan on April 29, 1880

Hepburn returned to the United States in 1892. On March 14, 1905, a day after Hepburn's 90th birthday, he was awarded the decoration of the Order of the Rising Sun, third class. Hepburn was the second foreigner to receive this honor.

He died on September 21, 1911, in East Orange, New Jersey, at the age of 96. He is interred in Orange's Rosedale Cemetery.

== Publications ==
- Hepburn, James Curtis (1867). A Japanese and English dictionary: with an English and Japanese index. London: Trübner & Co. (first edition) 690pp
- A Japanese and English dictionary: with an English and Japanese index (1867)
- Japanese-English and English-Japanese Dictionary (1881)
- Hepburn, James Curtis (1888). A Japanese-English and English-Japanese Dictionary. Tokyo: Z.P. Maruya & Company. (4th edition), 962pp (gives Japanese next to romaji)
- A Japanese-English and English-Japanese dictionary (1903)
- Hepburn, James Curtis (1905). Hepburn's Abridged Dictionary. Tokyo: Z.P. Maruya & Company. (2nd. ed. abridged), 1032pp (romaji only)

== See also ==
- List of Westerners who visited Japan before 1868
- Sakoku
