= William Elliot Griffis =

American protestant minister and Japanologist

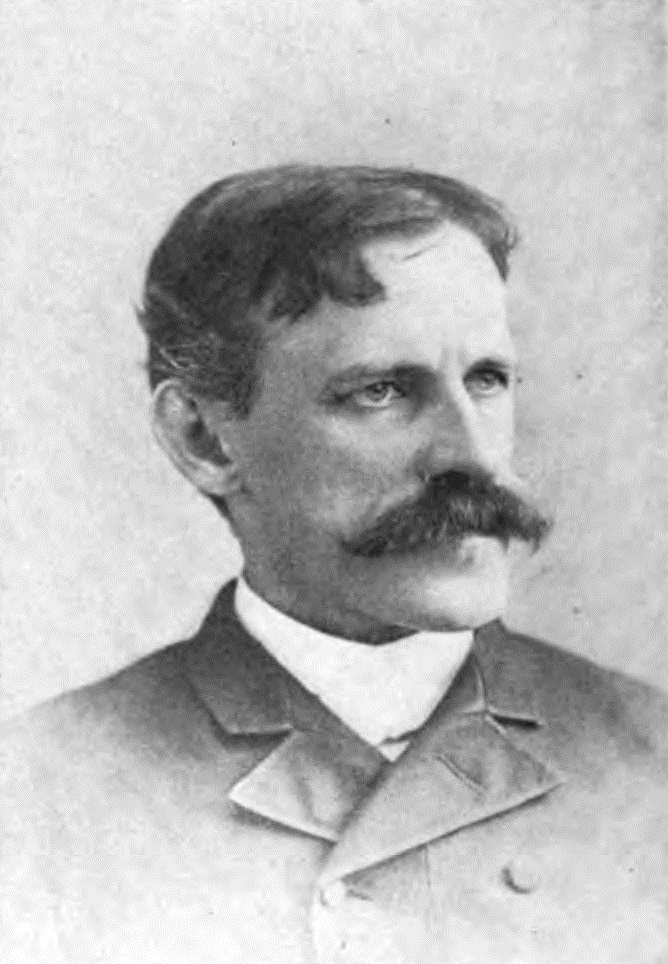
- Born: September 17, 1843; Philadelphia, Pennsylvania, U.S.
- Died: February 5, 1928 (aged 84); Winter Park, Florida, U.S.
- Occupations: Educator; missionary; author

William Elliot Griffis (September 17, 1843 - February 5, 1928) was an American orientalist, Congregational minister, lecturer, and prolific author.

== Early life ==
Griffis was born in Philadelphia, Pennsylvania, the son of a sea captain and later a coal trader. During the American Civil War, he served two months as a corporal in Company H of the 44th Pennsylvania Militia after Robert E. Lee invaded Pennsylvania in 1863. After the war, he attended Rutgers University at New Brunswick, New Jersey, graduating in 1869. At Rutgers, Griffis was an English and Latin language tutor for Tarō Kusakabe, a young samurai from the province of Echizen (part of modern Fukui).

After a year of travel in Europe, he studied at the seminary of the Reformed Church in America in New Brunswick (known today as the New Brunswick Theological Seminary).

== Modernizer in Japan ==
In September 1870 Griffis was invited to Japan by Matsudaira Shungaku, for the purpose of organizing schools along modern lines. In 1871, he was Superintendent of Education in the province of Echizen. In recompense, he was provided with a salary of $2,400, a house in Fukui and a horse.

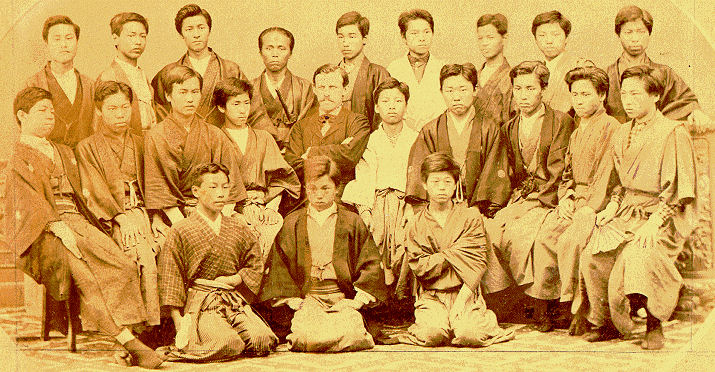
Griffis with a group of his students.

In 1872–74, Griffis taught chemistry and physics at Kaisei Gakkō (the forerunner of Tokyo Imperial University). He prepared the New Japan Series of Reading and Spelling Books, 5 vols. (1872). He also published primers for Japanese students of the English language; and he and contributed to the Japanese press and to newspapers and magazines in the United States numerous papers of importance on Japanese affairs.

Griffis was joined by his sister, Margaret Clark Griffis, who became a teacher at the Tokyo Government Girls' School (later to become the Peeresses' School). By the time they left Japan in 1874, Griffis had befriended many of Japan's future leaders.

Griffis was a member of the Asiatic Society of Japan, the Asiatic Society of Korea, the Historical Society of the Imperial University of Tokyo, and the Meirokusha.

== Education and ministry ==
Returning to the United States, Griffis attended Union Theological Seminary; and after finishing his studies in 1877, he was called to the ministry in a series of churches—at the First Reformed Church, Schenectady, New York (1877–1886); at the Shawmut Congregational Church, Boston, Massachusetts (1886–1893); and at the First Congregational Church, Ithaca, New York (1893–1903). Concurrently, at Union College in 1884, he earned a higher degree, Doctor of Divinity (D.D.). Rutgers awarded him an honorary degree, Doctor of Humane Letters (L.H.D.) in 1899.

== Writing and lectures ==
In 1903 he resigned from the active ministry to devote himself exclusively to writing and lecturing. His books on Japan and Japanese culture were complemented with extensive college and university lecture circuit itineraries. In addition to his own books and articles during this period, he also joined Inazo Nitobe in crafting what became his most well-known book, Bushido: The Soul of Japan.

In 1907, the Japanese government conferred the Order of the Rising Sun, Gold Rays with Rosette, which represents the fourth highest of eight classes associated with the award.

The prolific writer was also a prolific traveller, making eleven trips to Europe—primarily to visit the Netherlands. In 1898, he was present at the enthronement of Queen Wilhelmina; and he attended the Congress of Diplomatic History. He was among the group of Bostonians who wanted to commemorate the Pilgrims' roots in Holland; and the work was rewarded with the dedication of a memorial at Delfshaven and the placement of five other bronze historical tablets in 1909. He was one of four Americans elected to the Netherlands Society of Letters in Leiden.

In 1923 Griffis published "The Story of the Walloons: At Home in Lands of Exile and in America". In this work he reveals the long history and contributions of these Belgians. The last half of the book relates the story of New Belgium (Nova Belgica) in America, the first settlers of Manhattan being a group of Protestant Walloons who petitioned the Dutch West India Company to be sent to establish a colony in the New World. These Walloons were sent to Manhattan as well as to other smaller locations on the Delaware, Hudson and Connecticut Rivers. They sailed out of Leiden, Netherlands in 1624. Griffis draws parallels to the thoughts of government and freedom of the Walloons and the US Constitution of 1787, and how their ideas made a lasting contribution to this country, though at the time (1923) the Walloons were generally unknown and overshadowed by the Dutch and later, English. This remains true to a great degree even today.

In 1926, Griffis was invited to return to Japan; and on this trip, the Japanese government conferred a second decoration. He was presented with the Order of the Rising Sun, Gold Rays with Neck Ribbon, which represents the third highest of eight classes. A private rail car was provided by the Japanese government, and he visited several cities in the course of this return trip.

William Griffis died on February 5, 1928, at his home in Winter Park, Florida; after his death, his body was sent to Schenectady, New York, for burial. He is buried at Vale Cemetery along with his first wife, Katherine Lyra Stanton, his son John and his second wife, Sarah Francis King, after the death of Katherine in 1898 along with several other family members.

== Family ==
One of Griffis' two sons, Stanton Griffis, would become U.S. Ambassador to Poland, Egypt, Spain and Argentina under President Truman. Stanton Griffis was ambassador to Argentina while Juan and Eva Peron were in power and wrote of his experiences in a book titled Lying In State. The other son, John, became a composer.

=== Honors ===
- Order of the Rising Sun, Gold Rays with Neck Ribbon, 1926.
- Order of the Rising Sun, Gold Rays with Rosette, 1907.

== Time-line chronology ==
Griffis' life and publications are here organized chronologically.

- 1843 - Born September 17 in Philadelphia, the fourth child of seven and second son to John Limeburner Griffis and Anna Maria (Hess) Griffis.
- 1850 - Observes the launching of the USS Susquehanna in Philadelphia. The Susquehanna, the largest steamship yet commissioned by the US Navy, was to be Commodore Matthew C. Perry's flagship on the 1853-1854 Naval Expedition to Japan.
- 1860 - Sees the Shogun's Mission, the first Japanese Embassy to the US, when it visits Philadelphia.
- 1863 - Serves in Pennsylvania's 44th Regiment in the Civil War.
- 1866 - Enters Rutgers College.
- 1869 - Graduates with AB (Bachelor of Arts degree) from Rutgers College. In the summer, tours Europe with his sister, Margaret Clark Griffis, and family friend, Edward Warren Clark.
- 1870 - Sails for Japan to organize schools in Echizen.
- 1871 - Named Superintendent of Education in Echizen.
- 1872 - Awarded AM (Master of Arts degree) from Rutgers College. Publishes, in Yokohama, The New Japan Primer and The New Japan Pictorial Primer.
- 1872-74 - Serves as Professor of Physics at the Imperial University, Tokyo. In 1872, Griffis's sister Margaret Clark Griffis joins him in Tokyo, and is appointed teacher, and then principal, of the first government school for girls (to become the Tokyo Female Normal School).
- 1873 - Publishes The Tokio Guide and The Yokohama Guide (Yokohama).
- 1874 - Griffis and Margaret Clark Griffis return to America.
- 1876 - Publishes The Mikado's Empire.
- 1877 - Graduates from Union Theological Seminary.
- 1877-86 - Serves as Pastor of the First Reformed Church, Schenectady, NY
- 1879 - Marries Katherine L. Stanton (1859–98)
- 1880 - Publishes Japanese Fairy World: Thirty-five Stories from the Wonderlore of Japan
- 1882 - Publishes Corea: the Hermit Nation
- 1883 - Lillian Eyre Griffis (daughter) born in Schenectady
- 1884 - Awarded DD (Doctorate of Divinity) from Union College
- 1885 - Publishes Corea: Without and Within
- 1886-93 - Serves as Pastor of the Shawmut Congregational Church in Boston, MA
- 1887 - Stanton Griffis (first son) born in Boston. Publishes Matthew Calbraith Perry: A Typical American Naval Officer
- 1889 - Publishes The Lily Among Thorns: A Study of the Biblical Drama Entitled "The Song of Songs"
- 1890 - Publishes Honda the Samurai: A Story of Modern Japan
- 1891 - Publishes Sir William Johnson and the Six Nations, and an edition of The Arabian Nights
- 1892 - Publishes Japan: In History, Folklore and Art
- 1893 - John Elliot Griffis (second son) born in Boston
- 1893-1903 - Serves as Pastor of the First Congregational Church, Ithaca, NY
- 1894 - Publishes Brave Little Holland and What She Taught Us
- 1895 - Publishes The Religions of Japan From the Dawn of History to the Era of Meiji: Shinto, Buddhism and Confucianism, and Townsend Harris, First American Envoy in Japan [an edition of Harris's journals]
- 1897 - Publishes The Romance of Discovery: A Thousand Years of Exploration and the Unveiling of Continents
- 1898 - Publishes Charles Carlton Coffin: War Correspondent, Traveller, Author and Statesman; The Romance of American Colonization; The Pilgrims in Their Three Homes. Katherine Stanton Griffis dies in Ithaca on December 9
- 1899 - Publishes America in the East: A Glance at Our History, Prospects, Problems and Duties in the Pacific Ocean; The Romance of Conquest: The Story of American Expansion Through Arms and Diplomacy
- 1899 - Awarded LHD by Rutgers College
- 1900 - Marries Sarah Frances King (1868–1959). Publishes The American in Holland: Sentimental Rambles in the Eleven Provinces of the Netherlands; The Pathfinders of the Revolution: A Story of the Great March into the Wilderness and Lake George Region of New York in 1779; and Verbeck of Japan: A Citizen of No Country.
- 1901 - Publishes In the Mikado's Service: A Story of Two Battle Summers in China.
- 1902 - Publishes A Maker of the New Orient: Samuel Robbins Brown, Pioneer Educator in China, America, and Japan, the Story of his Life and Work, and Mighty England - Our Old Home.
- 1903 - Resigns pastorate to write and lecture full-time. Publishes John Chambers: Servant of Christ and Master of Hearts, and his Ministry in Philadelphia; Sunny Memories of Three Pastorates; and Young People's History of Holland.
- 1904 - Publishes Dux Christus: An Outline Study of Japan.
- 1907 - Decorated with the Order of the Rising Sun, Fourth Class, by the Emperor of Japan. Publishes The Japanese Nation in Evolution: Steps in the Progress of a Great People, and Christ, the Creator of the New Japan.
- 1908 - Publishes The Firefly's Lovers and Other Fairy Tales of Old Japan.
- 1909 - Publishes The Story of New Netherland: The Dutch in America.
- 1911 - Publishes China's Story in Myth, Legend, Art and Annals, and The Unmannerly Tiger and Other Korean Tales.
- 1912 - Publishes A Modern Pioneer in Korea: The Life Story of Henry G Appenzeller; Might England: the Story of the English People; The Call of Jesus to Joy; Belgium, the Land of Art.
- 1913 - Publishes Hepburn of Japan and His Wife and Helpmates: A Life Story of Toil for Christ. Margaret Clark Griffis dies in Ithaca, December 15.
- 1914 - Publishes The House We Live In, Architect and Tenant: Talks About the Body and the Right Use of It.
- 1915 - Publishes Millard Fillmore: Constructive Statesman, Defender of the Constitution, President of the US; The Mikado, Institution and Person: A Study of the Internal Political Forces of Japan; The Story of Belgium.
- 1916 - Publishes Bonnie Scotland and What We Owe Her.
- 1918 - Publishes Dutch Fairy Tales.
- 1919 - Publishes Belgian Fairy Tales.
- 1920 - Publishes Swiss Fairy Tales; Young People's History of the Pilgrims.
- 1921 - Publishes Welsh Fairy Tales; The Dutch of the Netherlands in the Making of America.
- 1922 - Publishes Korean Fairy Tales; Japanese Fairy Tales.
- 1923 - Publishes The Story of the Walloons, at Home, in the Lands of Exile and in America.
- 1924 - Publishes Proverbs of Japan: A Little Picture of the Japanese Philosophy of Life as Mirrored in Their Proverbs.
- 1926 - Publishes The American Flag of Stripes and Stars: Mirror of the Nation's History, Symbol of Brotherhood and World Unity.
- 1926-27 - With Frances King Griffis, journeys to Japan for the second time, stopping in Korea and Manchuria.
- 1926 - Decorated with the Order of the Rising Sun, Third Class.
- 1928 - Dies in Winter Park, Florida, February 5.

== Published works ==
- 1876 -- The Mikado's Empire
- 1880 -- Japanese Fairy World
- 1881 -- Asiatic History; China, Korea, and Japan
- 1882 -- Korea, the Hermit Nation
- 1885 -- Korea, Without and Within
- 1887 -- Matthew Calbraith Perry: A Typical American Naval Officer
- 1889 -- The Lily among Thorns
- 1890 -- Honda the Samurai: A Story of Modern Japan.
- 1891 -- Sir William Johnson and the Six Nations
- 1892 -- Japan in History, Folk-Lore, and Art
- 1894 -- Brave Little Holland and What she Taught us
- 1895 -- The Religions of Japan
- 1895 -- Townsend Harris, First American Envoy in Japan
- 1897 -- Romance of Discovery
- 1898 -- Charles Carlton Coffin: War Correspondent, Traveller, Author and Statesman
- 1898 -- Romance of American Colonization
- 1898 -- The Pilgrims in their Three Homes
- 1898 -- The Student's Motley
- 1899 -- The Romance of Conquest
- 1899 -- The American in Holland
- 1899 -- America in the East
- 1900 -- Verbeck of Japan
- 1900 -- The Pathfinders of the Revolution
- 1901 -- In the Mikado's Service
- 1902 -- A Maker of the New Orient
- 1903 -- Young People's History of Holland
- 1903 -- John Chambers
- 1903 -- Sunny Memories of Three Pastorates
- 1904 -- Dux Christus: An Outline Study of Japan
- 1907 -- Japanese Nation in Evolution: Steps in the Progress of a Great People
- 1908 -- The Fire-fly's Lovers and Other Fairy Tales of Old Japan
- 1909 -- The Story of New Netherland
- 1910 -- China's Study in Myth, Legend, Art, and Annuals
- 1911 -- The Unmannerly Tiger and Other Korean Tales
- 1912 -- A Modern Pioneer in Korea: The Life Story Of Henry G. Appenzeller
- 1913 -- Hepburn of Japan
- 1914 -- The House We Live In Architect and Tenant
- 1915 -- The Mikado Institution and Person
- 1915 -- Millard Fillmore: Constructive Statesman, Defender of the Constitution
- 1916 -- Bonnie Scotland and What We Owe Her
- 1918 -- Dutch Fairy Tales for young folks
- 1919 -- Belgian Fairy Tales
- 1920 -- Young People's History of the Pilgrims
- 1920 -- Swiss Fairy Tales
- 1921 -- Welsh Fairy Tales
- 1921 -- The Dutch of the Netherlands in the Making of America [reprinted by Kessinger Publishing, Whitefish, Montana, 2007. ISBN 978-0-548-61147-0 (paper)]
- 1922 -- Korean Fairy Tales
- 1922 -- Japanese Fairy Tales
- 1923 -- The Story of the Walloons, at Home, in the Lands of Exile and in America
- 1924 -- Proverbs of Japan: A Little Picture of the Japanese Philosophy of Life as Mirrored in Their Proverbs
- 1926 -- The American Flag of Stripes and Stars: Mirror of the Nation's History, Symbol of Brotherhood and World Unity

== See also ==
- Meiji Period
- Emperor Meiji
