= John West =

John West may refer to:

== People ==
=== Arts and sciences ===
- John West (horticulturist) (1856–1926), Australian journalist and horticulturist
- John West (mathematician) (1756–1817), Scottish mathematician
- John West (musician) (born 1964), hard rock singer, solo artist and member of Artension and Royal Hunt
- John West (singer) (born 1983), pop soul singer, solo artist
- John West (theatre) (1924–2008), Australian theatre historian and radio broadcaster
- John West (writer) (1809–1873), Australian congregational minister, author and newspaper editor
- John Anthony West (1932–2018), American author and Egyptologist
- John B. West (born 1928), Australian-American respiratory physiologist
- John G. West, American political scientist and Intelligent Design advocate

=== Politics ===
- John West, 1st Earl De La Warr (1693–1766), British soldier, courtier and politician
- John West, 2nd Earl De La Warr (1729–1777), British politician and soldier, son of the above
- John West, 4th Earl De La Warr (1758–1795), British aristocrat and courtier
- John West, 6th Baron De La Warr (1663–1723), English nobleman and courtier
- John West (Australian politician) (1852–1931), Australian politician and trade unionist
- John West (colonel) (1632–1691), American military officer and politician in colonial Virginia
- John West (governor) (1590–1659), American politician, colonial governor of Virginia
- John West III (1676–1734), American justice, sheriff, and politician in colonial Virginia
- John West (Scottish politician) (born 1988), Scottish politician, Scotland's youngest elected Local Authority Councillor
- John Beattie West (died 1842), Conservative politician for Dublin City
- John C. West (1922–2004), American politician, governor of South Carolina
- John P. West (1825–1892), Irish American farmer, military officer, and politician in both Iowa and California

=== Sports ===
- John West (cricketer, born 1844) (1844–1890), English cricketer and umpire
- John West (cricketer, born 1861) (1861–1920), English cricketer and umpire
- John West (footballer) (1888–?), Irish footballer
- Frank West (baseball) (John Franklin West, 1873–1932), Major League Baseball pitcher

=== Other ===
- John West (captain) (1809–1888), Scottish-American inventor and businessperson
- John West (pirate) (fl. 1713–1714), minor pirate in the Caribbean
- John West (missionary) (1778–1845), Church of England missionary in Canada, reformer in England
- John West (priest) (1806–1890), Dean of St Patrick's Cathedral, Dublin
- John West (Royal Navy officer) (1774–1862), Royal Navy officer
- John Alan West (1911–1964), British murder victim whose killing led to the last executions in Britain
- John F. West (1920–2001), environmentalist, activist from Marin County, California
- John C. West (philatelist) (1922–2016), vice-chancellor of the University of Bradford
- John Briggs West (1852–1922), American publisher
- John West (c. 1872–1922), African-American lynching victim in Hope, Arkansas; see Lynching of John West

== Other uses ==
- John West Foods, a Thai-owned English brand of canned fish (tuna, salmon, etc.)
- John West, a fictional character from the Frank Hardy 1950 novel Power Without Glory

== See also ==
- Johnny West (disambiguation)
- Jack West (disambiguation)
