= New York Shipbuilding strike =

1934 strike

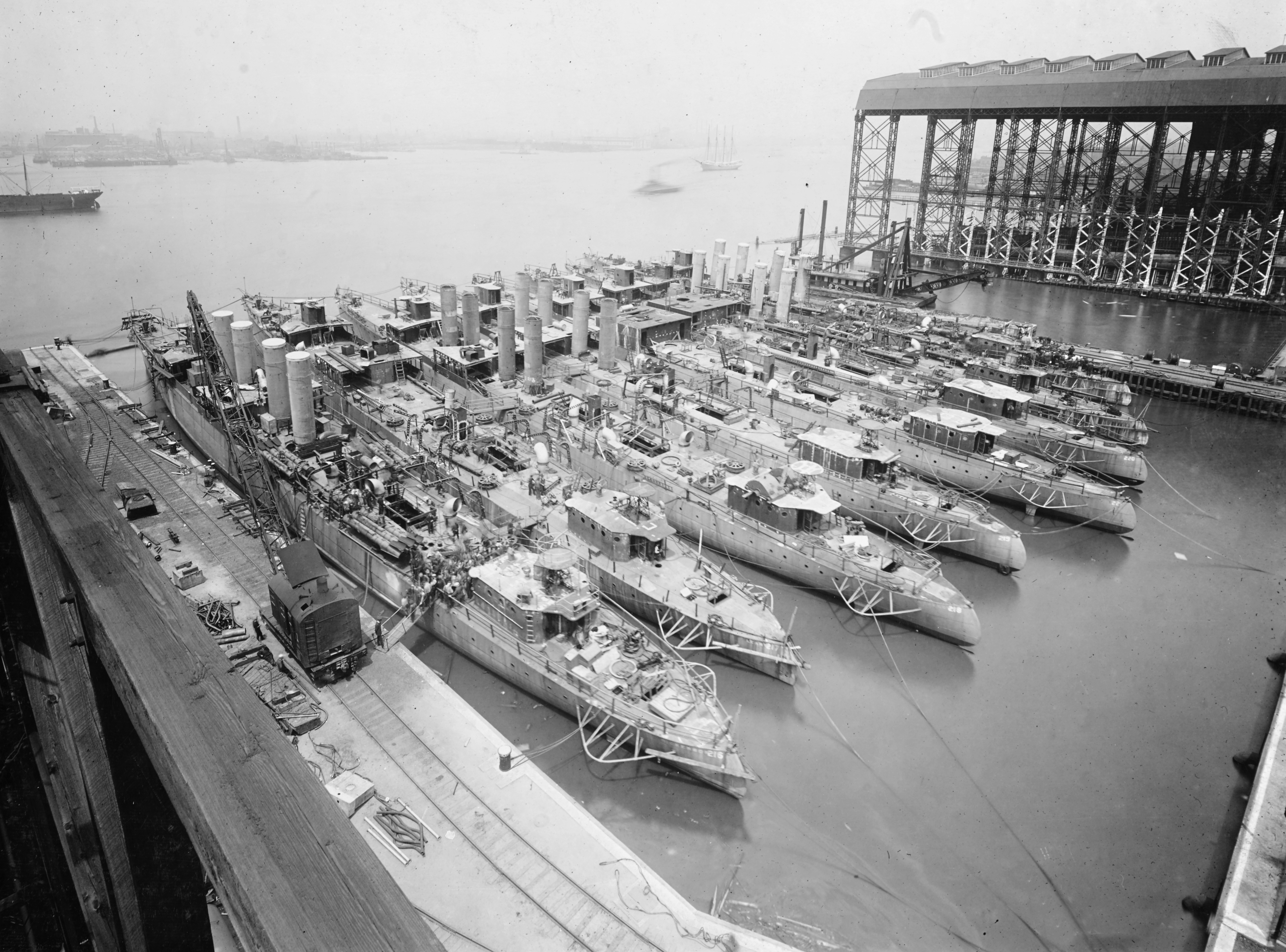
The New York Shipbuilding Company's Camden, New Jersey facility operating at capacity due to World War I.

The New York Shipbuilding strike was a strike that occurred in the Port of Camden, New Jersey, in the spring of 1934 by the New York Shipbuilding Company. Around 3,100 men took part in the 7-week action, centered at the company's Camden, New Jersey construction yard.

A second and longer strike of the company occurred in the spring and summer 1935, which required intervention from President Franklin D. Roosevelt to force a settlement.

== Company history ==
The New York Shipbuilding Company was established by Henry G. Morse in 1900. Though original plans were to site the works on Staten Island in New York State, the final site was based in Camden, New Jersey. By 1914, the company was the leader in naval production and by 1917 it was the largest shipyard in the world. In total, the company made over 670 merchant and warships, producing 30% of the US Navy's battleships by 1921. The company's ownership changed hands several times due to financial instability after World War I.

== 1934 strike ==
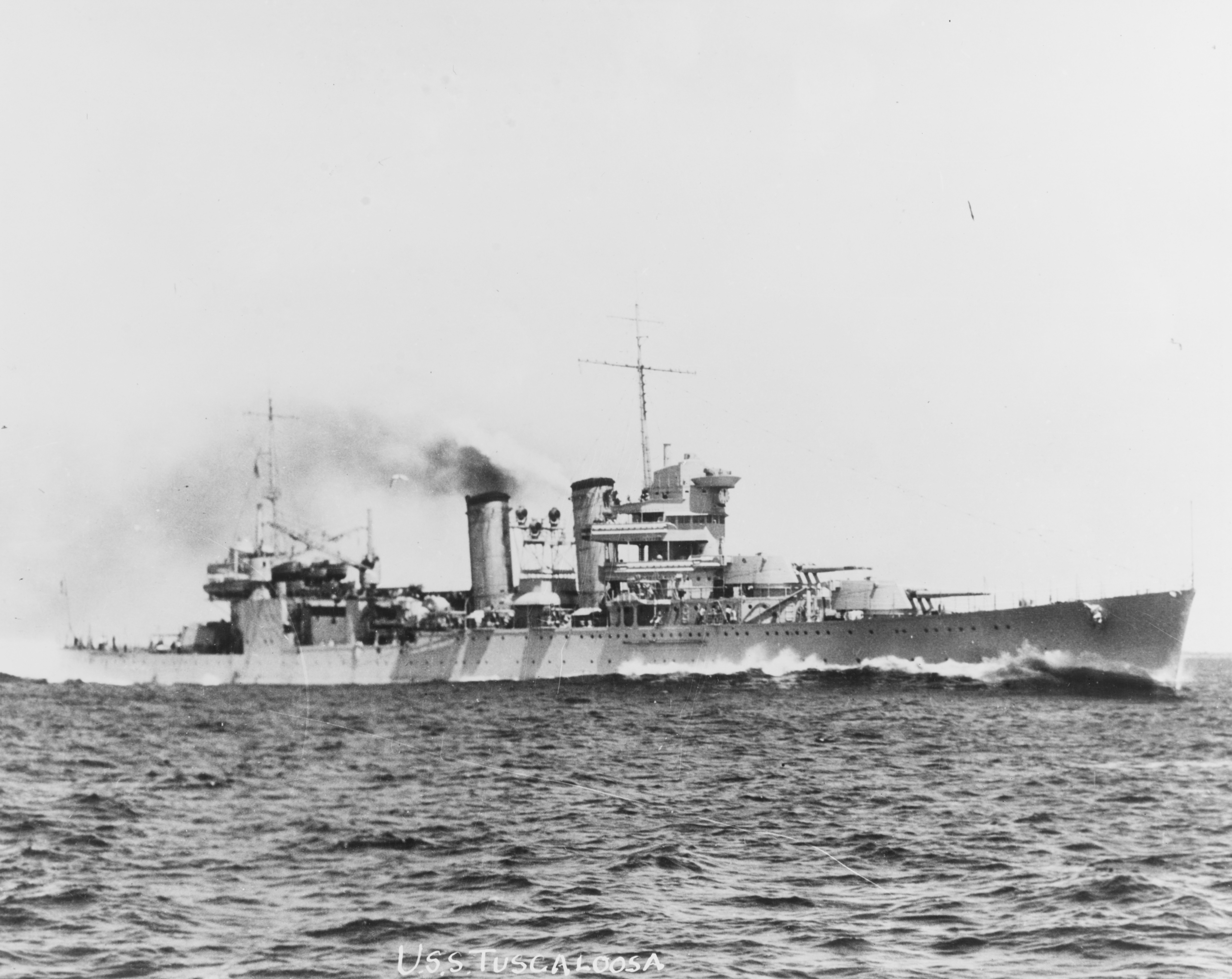
The strike occurred during construction of the Heavy cruiser USS Tuscaloosa.

By the summer of 1933, wages and conditions in the port were considered unsatisfactory due to the increased cost of living and lack of support by the American Federation of Labor. The Industrial Union of Marine and Shipbuilding Workers of America offered assistance, being organized by local left-wing and social workers in the area. By 1934, it had expanded and represented a quarter of a million members.

The workers went on strike on March 27, 1934, demanding an increase in wages and fewer working hours. Around 3,100 men took part in the action. Union members asked for "abolition of piecework and elimination of the company union with consequent enrollment of its members in the industrial union." This delayed work of $40,000,000 worth of ships. The "first-class" mechanics were currently making $23.20 for a 32-hour workweek. The union asked for an increase of $1 an hour for a 32-hour workweek for these mechanics, and increased wages for other job categories in the company as well.

On April 13, the New York Shipbuilding Company said it was officially closing down. Company president, Clinton L. Bardo, offered a 10% pay raise to the workers.

The wage increase was finally negotiated on May 13. The workers and union members were originally asking for 37.5%, but instead compromised on 14.6% after the Navy threatened to move construction of the cruiser Tuscaloosa to another Navy Yard. The company insisted they would not discriminate over rehiring workers, and increased working hours from 32 to 36 hours a week. The skilled mechanics received the highest wage increase, which was 16.5%. 1,300 workers’ wages increased from 61–71 cents an hour to 70–83 cents an hour.

On May 15, over 3,000 returned to work in Camden. The strike lasted for a total of seven weeks and stopped the production of many naval vessels, tankers and other ships. About 900 new men applied for a job at the shipyard, in order to participate in a new naval construction program. The union officers held a parade to celebrate the end of the strike.

The company resumed work, completing work on the Tuscaloosa, including a test run.

== 1935 strike ==
The Camden workers claimed that the company violated the strike agreement that was signed on May 12. In July, over 1,000 employees took part in a meeting at the Convention Hall. The union's executive secretary, John Green, was elected to go to Washington to ask for an inquiry, after the company failed to "give a week’s notice with pay on dismissal, failure to pay agreed rates to third-class helpers, and refusal to nominate its members to the board of arbitration." John Green said that the company was laying workers off instead of hiring them, as originally stated.

The company did not want to re-open negotiations, so a second strike was held between March and August 1935. Employees had had support from the United Mine Workers, ACW and AFL. The Secretary of Labor, Frances Perkins, investigated the background to the strike, reporting findings directly to the President, Franklin D. Roosevelt. Roosevelt, a former Secretary of the Navy, demanded that management negotiate with the union, threatening that otherwise the company would lose all US Naval contracts. This strike lasted for 11 weeks, surpassing the previous seven-week strike back in 1934.
