= John Lyons =

John or Jack Lyons may refer to:

== Business and industry ==
- John Lyons (American plantation owner) (c. 1822–1864), American steamship captain and plantation owner in Louisiana
- Jack Lyons (unionist) (1891–1961), American labor union leader
- Jack Lyons (financier) (1916–2008), British businessman and philanthropist
- John H. Lyons Jr. (1919–1986), American labor union leader, son of the older unionist
- John Lyons (British trade unionist) (1926–2016), British trade union leader

== Military ==
- John Lyons (Antiguan landowner) (1760–1816), British Royal Navy officer and landowner and politician in Antigua
- John Lyons (Royal Navy officer, born 1787) (1787–1872), British admiral, son of the above
- John Lyons (VC) (c. 1824–1867), Irish soldier in the British Army and recipient of the Victoria Cross

== Politics ==
- John R. Lyons (1860–1929), American politician, member of the Arizona State Senate
- John J. Lyons (c. 1881–1945), American politician, secretary of state of New York
- John Lyons (Australian politician) (1885–1948), member of the South Australian House of Assembly
- John Lyons (Longford politician), Irish member of the Dáil Éireann for Longford–Westmeath, 1922–1927
- John W. Lyons, American politician, mayor of Cambridge, Massachusetts, 1938–1941
- John Lyons (Northern Territory politician), Australian politician, member of the Northern Territory Legislative Council, 1963–1968
- John Lyons (British politician) (born 1949), British member of parliament
- John Lyons (Dublin politician) (born 1977), Irish member of the Dáil Éireann for Dublin North-West

== Sports ==
- Jack Lyons (cricketer) (1863–1927), Australian cricketer
- Jack Lyons (diver) (1873–1956), Canadian diver
- John Lyons (ice hockey) (1900–1971), American ice-hockey player
- Jack Lyons (soccer) (1901–1987), American soccer player
- John Lyons (end) (1911–1981), American football player
- Jack Lyons (footballer, born 1912) (1912–1988), Australian rules footballer for Geelong
- Jack Lyons (footballer, born 1919) (1919–1955), Australian rules footballer for Essendon and North Melbourne
- John Lyons (hurler) (1923–2005), Irish hurler
- John Lyons (horse trainer) (born 1947), American horse trainer
- John Lyons (American football coach) (born 1952), American football coach
- John Lyons (footballer, born 1956) (1956–1982), Welsh footballer

== Others ==
- John Charles Lyons (1792–1874), Anglo-Irish landowner, politician, antiquary, and horticulturalist
- John Lyons (bishop) (1878–1958), Canadian Anglican bishop
- J. B. Lyons (John Binignus Lyons, 1922–2007), Irish medical historian
- Sir John Lyons (linguist) (1932–2020), British linguist
- John Lyons (poet) (born 1933), Trinidad-born British poet and visual artist
- John Lyons (actor) (born 1943), British actor
- John Lyons (journalist) (born 1961), Australian journalist

== See also ==
- John Lyon (disambiguation)
- John Lions (1937–1998), Australian computer scientist
