= 2024 United States Senate election in New York =

- November 5, 2024
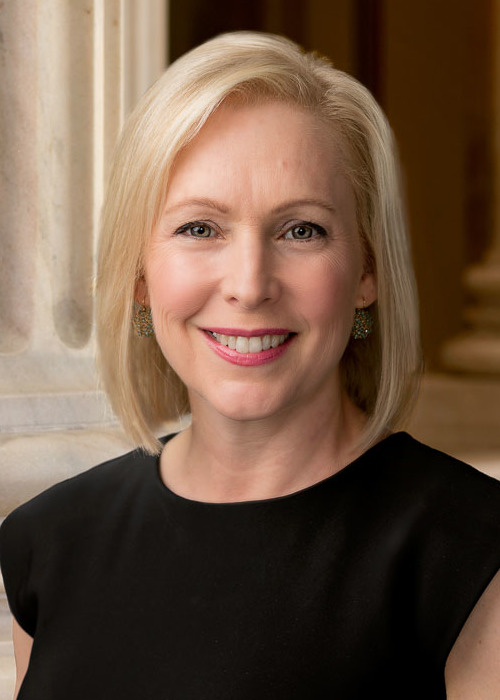

Nominee	Kirsten Gillibrand	Mike Sapraicone
Party	Democratic	Republican
Alliance	Working Families	Conservative
Popular vote	4,711,298	3,246,114
Percentage	58.82%	40.52%
- Gillibrand: 40–50% 50–60% 60–70% 70–80% 80–90% Sapraicone: 40–50% 50–60% 60–70% 70–80%
U.S. senator before election
Kirsten Gillibrand
Democratic
Elected U.S. Senator
Kirsten Gillibrand
Democratic

The 2024 United States Senate election in New York was held on November 5, 2024, to elect a member of the United States Senate to represent the state of New York. Democratic incumbent Kirsten Gillibrand was re-elected to a third full term, defeating Republican businessman Mike Sapraicone. Primary elections took place on June 25, 2024.

Republicans have not won a Senate race in New York since 1992.

Gillibrand's victory was significantly closer than her previous two, and followed Chuck Schumer's narrower victory in 2022. This was the state's second consecutive Senate election in which the Republican garnered over 40% of the vote.

Gillibrand received around 90,000 more votes than Kamala Harris, while Sapraicone received around 330,000 fewer votes than Donald Trump.

== Democratic primary ==
=== Candidates ===
==== Nominee ====
- Kirsten Gillibrand, incumbent U.S. senator

==== Disqualified ====
- Khaled Salem, nonprofit executive

==== Declined ====
- Jamaal Bowman, U.S. representative from New York's 16th congressional district (2021–2025) (unsuccessfully ran for re-election)
- Al Franken, former U.S. senator from Minnesota (2009–2018)
- Mondaire Jones, member of the U.S. Commission on Civil Rights (2023–present) and former U.S. representative from New York's 17th congressional district (2021–2023) (ran for U.S. House)
- Alexandria Ocasio-Cortez, U.S. representative from New York's 14th congressional district (2019–present) (ran for re-election)
- Ritchie Torres, U.S. representative from New York's 15th congressional district (2021–present) (ran for re-election)

=== Endorsements ===
Kirsten Gillibrand

Individuals

- Stuart Appelbaum, president of the Jewish Labor Committee (1998–present) and board member of the National Endowment for Democracy (2022–present)

Labor unions

- District Council 37
- New York State AFL–CIO
- New York State Nurses Association
- Retail, Wholesale and Department Store Union

Organizations

- American Israel Public Affairs Committee (AIPAC)
- Democratic Majority for Israel
- EMILY's List
- End Citizens United
- Feminist Majority PAC
- Giffords
- Humane Society Legislative Fund
- Jewish Democratic Council of America
- Joint Action Committee for Political Affairs
- League of Conservation Voters
- Natural Resources Defense Council
- Planned Parenthood Action Fund
- Population Connection Action Fund
- Stonewall Democratic Club of New York City
- Vote Mama

Political parties

- New York State Democratic Committee

=== Polling ===
Hypothetical polling

Kirsten Gillibrand vs. Andrew Cuomo

Poll source	Date(s) administered	Sample size (Note: Key: A – all adults RV – registered voters LV – likely voters V – unclear)	Margin of error	Kirsten Gillibrand	Andrew Cuomo	Undecided
American Pulse & Research Polling (R) (Note: Poll sponsored by Save the Senate)	November 30 – December 1, 2023	417 (V)	± 4.8%	49%	35%	16%

=== Fundraising ===
Campaign finance reports as of June 5, 2024
Candidate	Raised	Spent	Cash on hand
Kirsten Gillibrand (D)	$13,181,513	$13,105,874	$10,391,040
Source: Federal Election Commission

== Republican primary ==
=== Candidates ===
==== Nominee ====
- Mike Sapraicone, businessman and retired NYPD detective

==== Disqualified ====
- David Bellon, attorney
- Cara Castronuova, Newsmax reporter and former professional boxer
- Josh Eisen, businessman

==== Endorsements ====
Mike Sapraicone

Executive branch officials

- Donald Trump, 45th president of the United States (2017–2021)

Party chapters

- Nassau County Republican Party
- Queens Republican Party
- Suffolk County Republican Party
- Westchester County Republican Party
Cara Castronuova (disqualified)

U.S. representatives

- George Santos, former U.S. representative for New York's 3rd congressional district (Independent)

Local officials

- Rudy Giuliani, former mayor of New York City

Individuals

- Roger Stone, former advisor to Donald Trump

Party chapters

- Staten Island Republican Party
Josh Eisen (disqualified)

Statewide officials

- George Pataki, former governor of New York

Organizations

- New York Young Republican Club

=== Fundraising ===
Campaign finance reports as of June 5, 2024
Candidate	Raised	Spent	Cash on hand
Mike Sapraicone (R)	$738,958	$494,680	$244,277
Source: Federal Election Commission

== Independents ==
=== Candidates ===
==== Declared ====
- Diane Sare, political organizer and perennial candidate

==== Endorsements ====
Diane Sare

Organizations

- The LaRouche Organization

=== Fundraising ===
Campaign finance reports as of June 5, 2024
Candidate	Raised	Spent	Cash on hand
Diane Sare (I)	$331,307	$331,025	$6,726
Source: Federal Election Commission

== General election ==
=== Predictions ===
Source	Ranking	As of
The Cook Political Report	Solid D	November 9, 2023
Inside Elections	Solid D	November 9, 2023
Sabato's Crystal Ball	Safe D	November 9, 2023
Decision Desk HQ/The Hill	Safe D	June 8, 2024
Elections Daily	Safe D	May 4, 2023
CNalysis	Solid D	November 21, 2023
RealClearPolitics	Solid D	August 5, 2024
Split Ticket	Safe D	October 23, 2024
538	Solid D	October 23, 2024

=== Endorsements ===
Kirsten Gillibrand (D)

Individuals

- Stuart Appelbaum, president of the Jewish Labor Committee (1998–present) and board member of the National Endowment for Democracy (2022–present)

Labor unions

- District Council 37
- New York State AFL–CIO
- New York State Nurses Association
- Retail, Wholesale and Department Store Union

Organizations

- American Israel Public Affairs Committee (AIPAC)
- Democratic Majority for Israel
- EMILY's List
- End Citizens United
- Feminist Majority PAC
- Giffords
- Humane Society Legislative Fund
- Jewish Democratic Council of America
- Joint Action Committee for Political Affairs
- League of Conservation Voters
- Natural Resources Defense Council
- Planned Parenthood Action Fund
- Population Connection Action Fund
- Stonewall Democratic Club of New York City
- Vote Mama

Political parties

- New York State Democratic Committee
Mike Sapraicone (R)

Executive branch officials

- Donald Trump, 45th president of the United States (2017–2021)

Party chapters

- Nassau County Republican Party
- Queens Republican Party
- Suffolk County Republican Party
- Westchester County Republican Party

=== Fundraising ===
Campaign finance reports as of September 30, 2024
Candidate	Raised	Spent	Cash on hand
Kirsten Gillibrand (D)	$15,120,750	$23,896,091	$1,540,060
Michael Sapraicone (R)	$1,110,275 (Note: $550,050 of this total was self-funded by Sapraicone)	$771,871	$338,403
Diane Sare (I)	$457,732 (Note: $6,000 of this total was self-funded by Sare)	$455,244	$8,933
Source: Federal Election Commission

=== Polling ===
Aggregate polls

Source of poll aggregation	Dates administered	Dates updated	Kirsten Gillibrand (D)	Mike Sapraicone (R)	Undecided (Note: Calculated by taking the difference of 100% and all other candidates combined.)	Margin
538	through November 3, 2024	November 4, 2024	57.2%	33.9%	8.9%	Gillibrand +23.2%
RealClearPolitics	September 23 – October 27, 2024	October 29, 2024	55.0%	34.3%	10.7%	Gillibrand +20.7%
270ToWin	September 30 - November 4, 2024	November 4, 2024	55.8%	32.8%	11.4%	Gillibrand +23.0%
TheHill/DDHQ	through November 3, 2024	November 4, 2024	58.9%	34.8%	6.3%	Gillibrand +24.1%
Average			56.7%	34.0%	9.3%	Gillibrand +22.7%

Poll source	Date(s) administered	Sample size	Margin of error	Kirsten Gillibrand (D)	Mike Sapraicone (R)	Other	Undecided
Research Co.	November 2–3, 2024	450 (LV)	± 4.6%	61%	33%	2% (Note: "Some other candidate" with 2%)	4%
ActiVote	October 4–28, 2024	400 (LV)	± 4.9%	60%	40%	–	–
Cygnal (R)	October 26–27, 2024	600 (LV)	± 4.0%	58%	39%	1% (Note: Sare (I) with 1%)	2%
Siena College	October 13–17, 2024	872 (LV)	± 4.1%	57%	31%	2% (Note: "Wouldn't vote" with 2%)	9%
YouGov (Note: Poll sponsored by Rose Institute of State and Local Government)	October 7–17, 2024	1,089 (RV)	± 3.41%	57%	32%	–	11%
Emerson College (Note: Poll sponsored by The Hill and WPIX)	September 23–25, 2024	1,000 (LV)	± 3.0%	50%	33%	1% (Note: Sare (I) with 1%)	15%
ActiVote	August 24 – September 25, 2024	400 (LV)	± 4.9%	60%	40%	–	–
Siena College	September 11–16, 2024	1,003 (LV)	± 4.3%	54%	31%	3% (Note: "Wouldn't vote" with 2%; "Someone else" with 1%)	13%
ActiVote	July 8 – August 5, 2024	400 (LV)	± 4.9%	63%	37%	–	–
Siena College	July 28 – August 1, 2024	1,199 (LV)	± 4.0%	56%	33%	1% (Note: "Wouldn't vote" with 1%)	10%

Hypothetical polling

Kirsten Gillibrand vs. generic opponent

Poll source	Date(s) administered	Sample size	Margin of error	Kirsten Gillibrand (D)	Generic opponent	Undecided
Siena College	June 12–13 & 16–17, 2024	805 (RV)	± 4.1%	42%	42%	16%
Siena College	May 13–15, 2024	1,191 (RV)	± 3.9%	39%	41%	20%
Siena College	April 15–17, 2024	806 (RV)	± 4.1%	42%	39%	19%
Siena College	February 12–14, 2024	806 (RV)	± 4.2%	39%	37%	23%
Siena College	January 14–17, 2024	807 (RV)	± 4.5%	43%	38%	19%
Siena College	November 12–15, 2023	893 (RV)	± 4.6%	40%	35%	25%
Siena College	October 15–19, 2023	1,225 (RV)	± 3.4%	39%	38%	23%
Siena College	September 10–13, 2023	804 (RV)	± 4.3%	41%	37%	22%
Siena College	August 13–16, 2023	803 (RV)	± 4.4%	40%	41%	19%
Siena College	June 20–25, 2023	817 (RV)	± 3.9%	40%	40%	20%
Siena College	May 7–11, 2023	810 (RV)	± 4.1%	43%	38%	19%
Siena College	March 19–22, 2023	802 (RV)	± 4.6%	43%	38%	19%

=== Results ===
2024 United States Senate election in New York
Party	Candidate	Votes	%	±%
Democratic	Kirsten Gillibrand	4,318,903	53.91%	−8.07%
Working Families	Kirsten Gillibrand	392,395	4.89%	+2.25%
Total	Kirsten Gillibrand (incumbent)	4,711,298	58.82%	–8.14%
Republican	Mike Sapraicone	2,917,044	36.42%	+7.86%
Conservative	Mike Sapraicone	329,070	4.11%	+0.05%
Total	Mike Sapraicone	3,246,114	40.52%	+7.54%
LaRouche	Diane Sare	39,413	0.49%	N/A
Write ins	Write ins	13,492	0.17%	
Total votes		8,010,317	100.00%	N/A
Democratic hold				

==== By county ====
County	Kirsten Gillibrand Democratic		Michael Sapraicone Republican		Various candidates Other parties		Margin		Total
County	#	%	#	%	#	%	#	%	Total
Albany	95,231	65.3%	49,505	34.0%	1,034	0.8%	45,726	29.3%	145,770
Allegany	5,862	30.8%	13,066	68.7%	91	0.5%	-7,204	-27.9%	19,019
Bronx	260,993	75.7%	80,569	23.4%	3,269	0.9%	180,424	52.3%	344,831
Broome	47,049	53.5%	40,357	45.9%	574	0.6%	6,692	7.6%	87,980
Cattaraugus	12,172	36.8%	20,775	62.8%	140	0.4%	-8,603	-26.0%	33,087
Cayuga	16,352	46.1%	18,973	53.4%	173	0.5%	-2,621	-7.3%	35,498
Chautauqua	23,438	42.4%	31,622	57.2%	217	0.3%	-8,184	-14.8%	55,277
Chemung	15,835	43.4%	20,478	56.1%	161	0.4%	-4,643	-12.7%	36,474
Chenango	8,653	39.7%	13,050	59.8%	117	0.6%	-4,397	-20.1%	21,820
Clinton	18,614	53.4%	16,109	46.2%	160	0.4%	2,505	7.2%	34,883
Columbia	21,345	60.2%	13,890	39.2%	128	0.6%	7,455	21.0%	35,463
Cortland	10,469	48.6%	10,941	50.8%	136	0.7%	-472	-2.2%	21,546
Delaware	9,852	43.6%	12,620	55.8%	128	0.6%	-2,768	-13.2%	22,600
Dutchess	82,986	55.5%	65,871	44.0%	742	0.5%	17,115	11.5%	149,599
Erie	252,782	57.1%	187,547	42.4%	2,495	0.5%	62,235	14.7%	442,824
Essex	10,032	54.4%	8,351	45.3%	68	0.4%	1,681	9.1%	18,451
Franklin	9,357	49.5%	9,481	50.1%	70	0.3%	-124	-0.6%	18,451
Fulton	8,291	36.3%	14,449	63.3%	97	0.5%	-6,158	-27.0%	22,837
Genesee	9,736	35.1%	17,871	64.4%	126	0.4%	-8,135	-29.3%	27,733
Greene	11,133	45.1%	13,435	54.4%	144	0.6%	-2,302	-9.3%	24,712
Hamilton	1,283	38.3%	2,053	61.3%	13	0.4%	-770	-23.0%	3,349
Herkimer	9,671	35.1%	17,766	64.5%	122	0.4%	-8,095	-29.4%	27,559
Jefferson	17,511	42.6%	23,477	57.1%	150	0.4%	-5,966	-14.5%	41,138
Kings	194,631	74.9%	68,071	24.0%	9,076	1.1%	413,440	50.9%	811,778
Lewis	4,163	33.8%	8,099	65.7%	63	0.5%	-3,936	-31.9%	12,325
Livingston	12,830	42.3%	17,370	57.2%	144	0.5%	-4,540	-14.9%	30,344
Madison	15,138	45.8%	17,727	53.6%	192	0.6%	-2,589	-7.8%	33,057
Monroe	213,432	59.9%	140,764	39.5%	1,854	0.6%	72,668	20.4%	356,050
Montgomery	8,263	41.9%	11,383	57.7%	93	0.5%	-3,120	-15.8%	19,739
Nassau	344,787	49.7%	345,325	49.8%	3,298	0.5%	-538	-0.1%	693,410
New York	525,316	82.3%	107,064	16.8%	5,714	0.9%	418,252	65.5%	628,094
Niagara	44,641	45.1%	53,851	54.4%	462	0.5%	-9,210	-9.3%	98,954
Oneida	41,860	43.4%	54,056	56.1%	474	0.4%	-12,196	-12.7%	96,390
Onondaga	134,707	60.0%	88,547	39.4%	1,282	0.6%	46,160	20.6%	224,536
Ontario	29,924	50.6%	28,924	48.9%	248	0.5%	1000	1.7%	59,096
Orange	89,114	52.9%	78,309	46.5%	887	0.6%	10,805	6.4%	168,310
Orleans	5,480	32.0%	11,568	67.6%	60	0.3%	-6,088	-35.6%	17,108
Oswego	21,036	40.0%	31,216	59.4%	285	0.6%	-10,180	-19.4%	52,537
Otsego	13,345	48.5%	13,956	50.7%	222	0.8%	-611	-2.2%	27,523
Putnam	24,920	45.8%	29,310	53.8%	231	0.5%	-4,390	-8.0%	54,461
Queens	451,360	65.4%	232,407	33.7%	5,703	1.0%	218,953	31.7%	690,470
Rensselaer	41,950	54.1%	35,065	45.2%	507	0.6%	6,885	8.9%	690,470
Richmond	74,191	37.9%	119,958	61.3%	1,622	0.8%	-45,767	-23.4%	195,771
Rockland	72,003	52.7%	64,082	46.9%	599	0.4%	7,921	5.8%	136,684
St. Lawrence	19,322	45.8%	22,727	53.8%	170	0.4%	-3,405	-8.0%	42,219
Saratoga	68,479	53.2%	59,574	46.3%	633	0.5%	8,905	7.9%	128,686
Schenectady	40,626	58.2%	28,681	41.1%	489	0.7%	11,945	17.1%	69,798
Schoharie	6,156	39.1%	9,495	60.3%	88	0.6%	-3,339	-21.2%	15,739
Schuyler	3,815	41.1%	5,440	58.5%	37	0.4%	-1,625	-17.4%	9,262
Seneca	6,803	46.5%	7,769	53.1%	58	0.5%	-966	-7.6%	14,630
Steuben	15,857	35.7%	28,367	63.9%	139	0.3%	-12,510	-28.2%	44,363
Suffolk	348,948	47.1%	389,431	52.5%	2,760	0.4%	-40,483	-5.4%	741,139
Sullivan	15,755	47.7%	17,122	51.8%	176	0.5%	-1,367	-4.1%	33,053
Tioga	9,755	40.8%	14,036	58.8%	90	0.4%	-4,281	-18.0%	23,881
Tompkins	34,484	75.7%	10,738	23.6%	350	0.7%	23,746	52.1%	45,572
Ulster	60,364	62.3%	35,889	37.0%	629	0.7%	24,475	25.3%	96,882
Warren	18,162	51.8%	16,728	47.7%	167	0.5%	1,434	4.1%	35,057
Washington	12,539	44.9%	15,221	54.5%	151	0.6%	-2,682	-9.6%	27,911
Wayne	17,647	40.6%	25,686	59.1%	160	0.3%	-8,039	-18.5%	43,943
Westchester	287,607	64.8%	154,287	34.7%	2,202	0.5%	133,320	30.1%	444,096
Wyoming	5,330	28.5%	13,268	71.0%	85	0.4%	-7,938	-42.5%	18,683
Yates	4,471	43.4%	5,787	56.2%	48	0.4%	-1,316	-12.8%	10,306
Totals	4,711,298	58.82%	3,246,114	40.52%	52,905	0.66%	1,465,184	18.30%	8,010,317

Counties that flipped from Democratic to Republican

- Cayuga (largest municipality: Auburn)
- Cortland (largest municipality: Cortland)
- Franklin (largest municipality: Malone)
- Oneida (largest municipality: Utica)
- Otsego (largest municipality: Oneonta)
- Seneca (largest municipality: Seneca Falls)
- St. Lawrence (largest municipality: Massena)
- Sullivan (largest municipality: Monticello)
- Washington (largest municipality: Hudson Falls)
- Nassau (largest municipality: Hempstead)
- Richmond (Staten Island, borough of New York City)
- Suffolk (largest municipality: Brookhaven)

==== By congressional district ====
Gillibrand won 20 of 26 congressional districts, including one that elected a Republican.

District	Gillibrand	Sapraicone	Representative
1st	47%	53%	Nick LaLota
2nd	45%	55%	Andrew Garbarino
3rd	49.8%	49.6%	Tom Suozzi
4th	53%	47%	Laura Gillen
5th	74%	26%	Gregory Meeks
6th	57%	42%	Grace Meng
7th	76%	22%	Nydia Velázquez
8th	74%	25%	Hakeem Jeffries
9th	74%	24%	Yvette Clarke
10th	82%	17%	Dan Goldman
11th	41%	58%	Nicole Malliotakis
12th	81%	18%	Jerry Nadler
13th	83%	16%	Adriano Espaillat
14th	69%	30%	Alexandria Ocasio-Cortez
15th	77%	22%	Ritchie Torres
16th	68%	31%	
16th	68%	31%	George Latimer
17th	55%	45%	Mike Lawler
18th	57%	43%	Pat Ryan
19th	54%	45%	
19th	54%	45%	Josh Riley
20th	60%	40%	Paul Tonko
21st	44%	55%	Elise Stefanik
22nd	56%	44%	
22nd	56%	44%	John Mannion
23rd	42%	58%	Nick Langworthy
24th	41%	59%	Claudia Tenney
25th	60%	40%	Joseph Morelle
26th	62%	37%	Tim Kennedy

== Notes ==
Partisan clients
