= Jack West (disambiguation) =

Jack West may refer to:

- Jack West (1889 – 1960), Australian rules footballer
- Jack West (architect) (1922 – 2010), American architect
- Charles A. West, (1890 – 1957), American coach
- Jack West Jr, fictional character
- Murder of John Alan West, 1964 crime which led to the last death sentences being carried out in the United Kingdom
- Jack West (American football), 1939 All-Big Six Conference football team selectee

== See also ==
- Jake West
- Jackson West, character on The Rookie
- John West
- Johnny West
