= Jake West =

Jake West may refer to:

- Jake West (unionist) (1928–2007), American labor union leader
- Jake West (director) (born 1972), British film director
- Jake West (basketball) (born 2006), American basketball player

== See also ==
- Jane West (disambiguation)
- Jack West (disambiguation)
- Jake Westbrook (born 1977), American baseball player
- Jay West (born 1964), American politician
- Jacob Wester (born 1987), Swedish skier
