= John Lyon =

John or Jack Lyon may refer to:

== Clan Lyon (Scotland) ==
- John Lyon, 1st Thane of Glamis (1340–1382), Chamberlain of Scotland and progenitor of Clan Lyon
- John Lyon, 1st Master of Glamis (c. 1377–1435), son of the above
- John Lyon, 3rd Lord Glamis (1431–1497), grandson of the above
- John Lyon, 4th Lord Glamis (died 1500), son of the above
- John Lyon, 6th Lord Glamis (died 1528), son of the above
- John Lyon, 7th Lord Glamis (c. 1510–1558), son of the above
- John Lyon, 8th Lord Glamis (died 1578), Scottish nobleman, judge and Lord High Chancellor of Scotland, son of the above
- John Lyon, 2nd Earl of Kinghorne (1596–1646), grandson of the above
- John Lyon, 4th Earl of Strathmore and Kinghorne (1663–1712), grandson of the above
- John Lyon, 5th Earl of Strathmore and Kinghorne (1696–1715), son of the above
- John Bowes, 9th Earl of Strathmore and Kinghorne (born John Lyon, 1737–1776), nephew of the above
- John Bowes, 10th Earl of Strathmore and Kinghorne (John Lyon-Bowes, 1769–1820), son of the above
- John Bowes-Lyon (1886–1930), great-great-great-grandson of the 9th Earl and uncle of Queen Elizabeth II

== Sport ==
- Jack Lyon (footballer) (1893–1975), English footballer
- John Lyon (cricketer) (1951–2010), English cricketer
- John Lyon (boxer) (born 1962), English boxer

== Other people ==
- Sir John Lyon (lord mayor) (1514–1564), English landowner who served as Lord Mayor of London in 1554–1555
- John Lyon (school founder) (c. 1514–1592), English landowner and founder of Harrow School and John Lyon's Charity and namesake of the John Lyon School, first cousin of the above
- John Lyon (botanist) (1765–1814) Scottish botanist and plant collector in the United States
- John Lyon (poet) (1803–1889), Scottish Latter Day Saint poet and hymn writer
- Jack Lyon (1898–1941), New Zealand politician
- John Lyon (civil servant) (born 1948), British civil servant
- Southside Johnny (John Lyon, born 1948), American singer

== See also ==
- John Lyons (disambiguation)
