= Kentucky Energy and Environment Cabinet =

Agency overview
- Jurisdiction: Government of Kentucky
- Headquarters: Frankfort, Kentucky
- Agency executives: John Lyons, Cabinet Secretary; vacant, Deputy Secretary
- Child agencies: Kentucky Department for Environmental Protection; Kentucky Department for Natural Resources; Office of Kentucky Nature Preserves; Kentucky Office of Energy Policy
- Website: https://eec.ky.gov/Pages/index.aspx

The Kentucky Energy and Environment Cabinet is a government organization in the US state of Kentucky.

It houses the state's Department for Environmental Protection, Department for Natural Resources, Office of Energy Policy and the Office of Kentucky Nature Preserves.

The cabinet is responsible for a range of environmental regulatory duties in the commonwealth, including protection of air and water, waste management, permitting for mining, forestry and conservation. Some of the cabinet's regulatory authority is delegated by the U.S. Environmental Protection Agency.

The cabinet's stated mission, according to a 2022-26 strategic plan, is to "Improve the quality of life for all Kentuckians by protecting our land, air, and water resources; by utilizing our natural resources in an environmentally conscientious manner; by helping families connect with nature and preserving the Commonwealth’s natural heritage; and by supporting innovative, resilient, and sustainable energy solutions that together bring economic benefit to the commonwealth."

== Organization ==
Secretary John Lyons leads the cabinet. He was appointed by Kentucky Gov. Andy Beshear in April 2026.

=== Offices ===
- Department for Environmental Protection
  - Division for Air Quality
  - Division of Waste Management
  - Division of Water
  - Division of Enforcement
  - Division of Environmental Program Support
- Department for Natural Resources
  - Division of Conservation
  - Division of Forestry
  - Division of Mine Reclamation and Enforcement
  - Division of Mine Permits
  - Division of Mine Safety
  - Division of Abandoned Mine Lands
  - Division of Oil and Gas
  - Office of the Reclamation and Guaranty Fund
- Office of Energy Policy
  - Division of Energy Assistance
- Office of Kentucky Nature Preserves
- Kentucky Public Service Commission
  - Division of Financial Analysis
  - Division of General Administration
  - Office of General Counsel
  - Division of Inspections

== Links ==
- Kentucky Energy and Environment Cabinet - Official webpage
