= Walter Wise =

American labor leader (1951–2026)

Walter Witten Wise Jr. (November 5, 1951 – February 12, 2026) was an American labor union leader.

== Life and career ==
Born in Bluefield, West Virginia, on November 5, 1951, Wise moved with his family to California, then returned to Virginia, to study engineering at Virginia Tech. In 1973, he undertook an apprenticeship as an ironworker in Roanoke, Virginia, and joined the International Association of Bridge, Structural, Ornamental and Reinforcing Iron Workers. In the late 1980s, he became business manager of his local union, and then in 1997 he became a general organizer for the international union.

In 1998, Wise was elected as president of the Mid-Atlantic States District Council of the union, also becoming a general vice-president of the international union. He was next elected as general treasurer of the union, and then in 2008 as general secretary. In 2011, he was appointed general president of the union. He also served as a vice-president of the AFL-CIO. He retired in 2015.

Wise died at his home in Hendersonville, North Carolina, on February 12, 2026, at the age of 74.

Trade union offices
Preceded by Mike Fitzpatrick	General Secretary of the International Association of Bridge, Structural, Ornamental and Reinforcing Iron Workers; 2008–2011	Succeeded by Eric Dean
Preceded by Joseph J. Hunt	President of the International Association of Bridge, Structural, Ornamental and Reinforcing Iron Workers; 2011–2015	Succeeded by Eric Dean
