= Clinton L. Bardo =

American industrialist

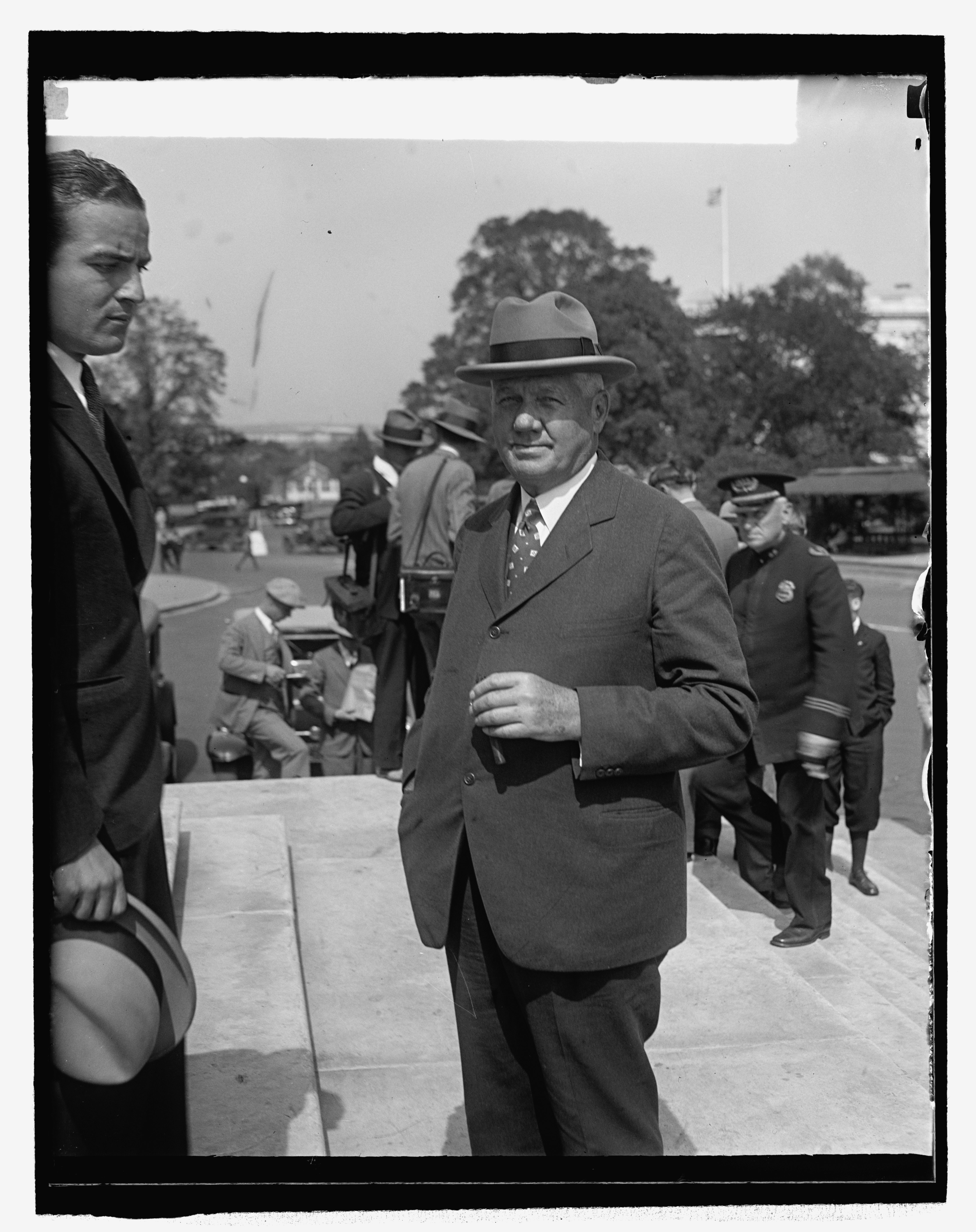
- Born: 1868
- Died: 1937 (aged 68–69); The Bronx, New York, U.S.
- Occupations: Industrialist, railroad manager, shipbuilder

Clinton L. Bardo (1868 – 1937) was an American industrialist whose career included stints as general manager of the New York, New Haven and Hartford Railroad and president of New York Shipbuilding. As president of the National Association of Manufacturers (NAM) from 1934 to 1935, he became an outspoken opponent of U.S. President Franklin D. Roosevelt's New Deal.

== Railroad industry ==
Bardo joined the Pennsylvania Railroad as a 17-year-old telegrapher in 1885, and spent the next four decades in the employ of the Pennsy, the Lehigh Valley Railroad, New York Central, and the New Haven. In February 1913, he became general manager of the New Haven, which through the acquisition of nearly 100 smaller railroads had become the dominant road in New England. He held the title of general manager or assistant to the president of the railroad until his resignation in 1925. His tenure spanned the investigation into two fatal train wrecks in 1913 and the 1922-23 shopmen's strike. He was appointed Trustee of the bankrupt New York, Westchester & Boston Railway (a subsidiary of the New Haven) in 1935. Bardo sought a sound reorganization plan for the NYW&B, but died of a heart attack on August 3, 1937.

== Shipbuilding industry ==
On leaving the New Haven, Bardo accepted a position as vice president of the newly organized American Brown Boveri Electric Corporation, which had just acquired ownership of one of the largest American shipyards, the New York Shipbuilding Corporation of Camden, NJ. Bardo would serve as president of New York Shipbuilding until 1934, a period during which the company was challenged by the Depression, a shipbuilding drought, and labor unrest, That unrest led to a 47-day strike in the spring of 1934 and the founding of the Industrial Union of Marine and Shipbuilding Workers of America (IUMSWA). In 1929, he was the first witness called to testify before the Senate Naval Affairs Committee in an investigation into collusion in the awarding of Navy shipbuilding contracts.

== NAM ==
When first elected president of the National Association of Manufacturers in January 1934, Bardo publicly pledged that the manufacturing industry would fully support the Federal recovery plan. But by the fall of 1935, Bardo was opposing a renewal of the National Recovery Act, calling on the association's members to fight "propaganda" and pushing for greater political activism against "the new economic order proclaimed by President Roosevelt."

== Personal ==
Bardo died in the Bronx Hospital at the age of 69.
