= Eric Dean =

Eric M. Dean is an American labor union leader.

Born in Chicago, Dean joined the International Association of Bridge, Structural, Ornamental and Reinforcing Iron Workers in 1980, when he undertook an apprenticeship as an ironworker. In 1989, he became an officer of his local union, and in 1999 he began working as a general organizer for the international union, in the Department of Ornamental, Architectural and Miscellaneous Metals.

Dean was elected as president of the Chicago and Vicinity District Council of Iron Workers in 2005, and in 2008, he was appointed as a vice-president of the international union. He was elected as general secretary of the union in 2011, and studied on the Harvard Trade Union Program. In 2015, he won election as president of the union. He also became secretary of the National Coordinating Committee for Multiemployer Plans, and a vice-president of the AFL-CIO.

Trade union offices
Preceded by Walter Wise	General Secretary of the International Association of Bridge, Structural, Ornamental and Reinforcing Iron Workers; 2011–2015	Succeeded by Ron Piksa
Preceded by Walter Wise	President of the International Association of Bridge, Structural, Ornamental and Reinforcing Iron Workers; 2015–present	Succeeded by Incumbent
