= Joseph J. Hunt =

Joseph J. Hunt (born 1942) is an American former labor union leader.

Born in St. Louis, Hunt followed his father and grandfather in becoming an ironworker, and joining the International Association of Bridge, Structural, Ornamental and Reinforcing Iron Workers. He held various positions in his local union, then was appointed as a general organizer for the international union, relocating to Washington, D.C.

In 1990, Hunt moved back to St. Louis, winning election as president of the union's district council. In 1994, he won election as an international vice-president of the union, and then in 1998 he became general treasurer. In 2001, he was elected as general president of the union, defeating an Ohio-based official. As leader of the union, he focused on increasing its transparency, regaining trust following the conviction for embezzlement of his predecessor.

Hunt also served as a vice-president of the AFL-CIO. From 2003, he served on the board of Ullico, becoming chair in 2006. He retired from his union posts in 2011, and from Ullico in 2023.

Trade union offices
Preceded by Jake West	President of the International Association of Bridge, Structural, Ornamental and Reinforcing Iron Workers; 2001–2011	Succeeded by Walter Wise
Business positions
Preceded by Terence M. O'Sullivan	Chairman of the Board of Ullico; 2006–2023	Succeeded by Edward Smith
