= Jane West =

Jane West may refer to:

- Jane West (novelist) (1758–1852)
- Jane West (campaigner) (born 1976)
- Jane West (aristocrat) (1558–1621)
- Jane West Clauss, née West, American architect and educator
- The Jane, formerly the Jane West Hotel, in Manhattan, New York City

== See also ==
- Jayne West (born 1955)
- Deputy Jane West, 1990s Canadian Champion Two-Year-Old Filly & Canadian Champion Three-Year-Old Filly
- Jake West
