= Alvin Heaps =

American labor union leader (1919–1986)

Alvin Eugene Heaps (December 4, 1919 – September 5, 1986) was an American labor union leader.

Born in Royalton, Illinois, Heaps moved to Chicago in the 1930s, where he worked in a bakery. He founded a union among workers at the bakery, and after searching for a larger union to affiliate with, he settled on the Retail, Wholesale and Department Store Union. He served in the United States Army infantry during World War II, then after the war returned to organizing workers, notably at the anti-union Montgomery Ward.

Heaps was elected as secretary-treasurer of the international union in 1948, in which role he was noted for his support of the civil rights movement, and also of the Israeli labor movement. In 1976, he was elected as president of the union, and shortly afterwards, as a vice-president of the AFL-CIO. In 1981, he was seriously injured by a bomb sent to his office, a crime which was never solved.

Heaps died in 1986, while still in office.

Trade union offices
Preceded by John V. Cooney	Secretary-Treasurer of the Retail, Wholesale and Department Store Union; 1948–1976	Succeeded by Frank Parker
Preceded by Max Greenberg	President of the Retail, Wholesale and Department Store Union; 1976–1986	Succeeded by Lenore Miller
