= Ironworker Management Progressive Action Cooperative Trust =

Non-profit trust in the United States

IMPACT
- Ironworker Management Progressive; Action Cooperative Trust
- Founded: 2003
- Headquarters: Washington, D.C.
- Location: United States
- Key people: Kevin Hilton, CEO
- Affiliations: BCTD; Ironworkers International
- Website: www.impact-net.org

The Ironworker Management Progressive Action Cooperative Trust (IMPACT) is a joint, labor-management, non-profit trust formed under Section 302(c) (9) of Labor-Management Relations (Taft-Hartley) Act which includes contributing Local Unions of the International Association of Bridge, Structural, Ornamental and Reinforcing Iron Workers and their signatory contractors.

== Origins ==
Ironworkers Union General President Joseph Hunt announced the formation of the Ironworker Management Progressive Action Cooperative Trust at its annual officer's meeting in Hollywood, FL on February 23, 2003.

== Overview ==
IMPACT is a labor management partnership designed to provide a forum for union iron workers and signatory contractors to address mutual concerns and encourage reasonable balanced solutions. The primary mission of IMPACT is to expand job opportunities for union iron workers and their signatory contractors. IMPACT develops, funds, and implements programs on a regional and national scale to address the challenges faced in the union iron working industry.

== Leadership ==
IMPACT is overseen by a board of trustees composed of an equal number of iron worker and contractor representatives. Iron Workers Union General President Eric Dean and Ben Hur Construction Company president and CEO, Bill Brown serve as co-chairs. In addition to the two co-chairs, there are equal numbers of trustees representing iron workers and contractors for a total of 32 trustees: 16 iron workers and 16 contractors. The Chief Executive Officer of IMPACT is Kevin Hilton.

== Regional Advisory Boards ==
The U.S. is divided into 10 regions, and Canada is divided into three regions. Those regions are created along Iron Worker District Council jurisdictional borders and represent general areas of North America. Each board is managed by a labor and management executive committee appointed by the IMPACT trustees.

The Regional Advisory Boards (RABs) serve as a forum for both Local Unions and contractors to identify and address existing problems. Any contractor that uses Iron Workers is eligible to attend their local RAB meetings.

External links

- IMPACT official site.
- Ironworkers official site.
