= Lenore Miller =

American labor union leader (1932–2025)

Lenore Miller (March 10, 1932 – June 2, 2025) was an American labor union leader.

== Life and career ==
Born in Union City, New Jersey, Miller studied at Rutgers University, Purdue University, and The New School for Social Research. In 1958, she began working as a secretary at the Retail, Wholesale and Department Store Union (RWDSU), and was soon promoted to become assistant to the union's president. In 1978, she was elected as a vice president of the union, then in 1980, as its secretary-treasurer. In 1986, she was elected as president of the union, the first woman to serve in the post. The following year, she became a vice president of the AFL-CIO and the first woman union president to serve on the federation's executive council.

As the leader of the union, Miller campaigned for improved day care provision, and for family leave to be more widely available. She campaigned on health and safety at work, and for the representation of low paid workers by unions. She served on the executives of the International Union of Food, Agricultural, Hotel, Restaurant, Catering, Tobacco and Allied Workers' Associations and the International Federation of Commercial, Clerical, Professional and Technical Employees, in which roles she campaigned for democracy and human rights around the world. She also served as vice chair of the President's Committee on Employment of People with Disabilities, and as president of the Jewish Labor Committee.

Under her leadership, in 1993, the RWDSU affiliated with the United Food and Commercial Workers, while retaining its separate identity. Miller retired in 1998.

Miller died on June 2, 2025, at the age of 93.

Trade union offices
Preceded by Alvin Heaps	President of the Retail, Wholesale and Department Store Union; 1986–1998	Succeeded by Stuart Appelbaum
Preceded by Herb Magidson	President of the Jewish Labor Committee; 1989–1998	Succeeded by Morton Bahr
