= International Association of Bridge, Structural, Ornamental and Reinforcing Iron Workers =

North American trade union

- Abbreviation: IW
- Formation: February 4, 1896
- Type: Trade union
- Headquarters: Washington, D.C., US
- Locations: Canada; United States
- Members: 123,906 (2014)
- President: Kevin Bryenton
- Secretary: James Mahoney
- Treasurer: David Beard
- Affiliations: AFL-CIO (North America's Building Trades Unions); Building and Wood Workers' International; Canadian Labour Congress
- Website: ironworkers.org

The International Association of Bridge, Structural, Ornamental and Reinforcing Iron Workers is a union in the United States and Canada which represents, trains and protects primarily construction workers, as well as shipbuilding and metal fabrication employees.

== Origins ==
The union was formed on February 4, 1896, at a meeting in Pittsburgh, Pennsylvania, with 16 delegates from the local unions in Boston, Massachusetts, Buffalo, New York, Chicago, Illinois, Cleveland, Ohio, New York City, New York, Detroit, Michigan, Philadelphia, Pennsylvania, and Pittsburgh. Those locals, and others established later, often protected their own autonomy jealously, rejecting at least one national contract with the American Bridge Company because it would have reduced their power. The internal divisions also led the union, which had affiliated with the American Federation of Labor shortly after its formation, to disaffiliate in 1901, only to reaffiliate two years later. It was one of the charter members of the AFL's Building Trades Department, which was created in 1908.

== History of iron work ==
Iron work is a skilled craft that dates back to the late 19th century and is a result of the rapid rise in the use of modern steel in iron bridges and skyscrapers. It was and is also an exceptionally dangerous job; hundreds of iron workers fell to their death every year in the late years of the nineteenth century. As one saying among Iron Workers of the day put it, "We're killed, but we seldom ever die."

== Battles with employers ==
A number of employers tried to destroy the craft unions that made up the AFL in the first decade of the twentieth century by insisting on maintaining an "open shop", i.e. hiring without reference to union membership. For craft unions, such as the Iron Workers, who maintained union wages and working conditions by controlling the supply of labor, the open shop meant that the employer was free to set any wage standards it chose and to discriminate against union members in hiring.

The Iron Workers had successfully repelled the open shop demands of American Bridge Company (or "Ambridge"), an arm of the United States Steel Corporation, in 1903. In 1905, after the union's collective bargaining agreement with Ambridge had expired, Ambridge and the other members of the National Erectors Association began refusing to hire union members and hired labor spies to infiltrate the union. When the Iron Workers struck in response, the employers obtained injunctions and local ordinances that barred picketing or limited it to an ineffective display. Open shop demands still exist today. Non-union iron-working companies are in competition to take over union jobs, but the non-union hourly wage is based on the union rate.

=== Los Angeles Times bombing ===
Between the years of 1908 and 1911, 87 to 150 bombings took place at work sites, including some bombs set up by union members. The most famous one, and the only one to cause any loss of life, killed twenty employees of the Los Angeles Times on October 1, 1910. Times publisher Harrison Gray Otis was a staunch opponent of labor unions, and the main supporter for the open shop movement in Los Angeles. Authorities arrested James B. McNamara and Ortie McManigal in Detroit, carrying dynamite in a suitcase. Both men were in positions of importance in the Ironworkers Union. McManigal confessed to a number of dynamite bombings, and named the Secretary-Treasurer of the union, John J. McNamara, as the man who directed the bombings. James and Jim McNamara were brothers, and John gave James $1,000 per month from the union's treasury to finance the bombings.

The union hired famed attorney Clarence Darrow to defend the McNamaras. Darrow, however, concluded that the brothers faced a strong chance of receiving the death penalty for the crime. Darrow therefore made a clumsy attempt, in broad daylight in downtown Los Angeles, to bribe one of the jurors. As it turned out, it was a trap and Darrow was arrested. Now more desperate than ever, he persuaded the McNamaras to plead guilty on the basis of an unwritten plea bargain that would have freed John. Once they pleaded guilty, however, the authorities denied that they had any deal at all. John McNamara served nearly ten years, while his brother spent his remaining years in prison.

Their guilty pleas effectively defeated the campaign of Job Harriman, then running for mayor of Los Angeles as a socialist, and nearly destroyed Darrow's career and reputation. The federal government then indicted dozens of other Iron Worker officers for conspiring to transport dynamite as part of this campaign; the International's current President, Frank M. Ryan, and one of its future Presidents, Paul "Paddy" Morrin, were convicted along with several other defendants on December 31, 1912, after a trial in which Herbert Hockin, the International Secretary-Treasurer, testified against them.

John J. McNamara later returned to the union after his release from state prison. He was expelled from the union in 1928, however, for submitting false audit reports on behalf of his local union.

In 2006, Journalist Robert Fitch described the Ironworkers Union bombings as perhaps the largest domestic terrorism campaign in American history, and further notes the Los Angeles Times bombing and subsequent trials as marked a precipitous decline in labor union power in the Los Angeles area.

== Battles with the AFL, employers and the IWW ==
The Iron Workers soon found themselves at war with the AFL and, in particular, the United Brotherhood of Carpenters and Joiners of America. The Carpenters claimed that pile-driving work, which was done primarily by Iron Workers in many areas, belonged to them and convinced the Building Trades Department to go along with them. When the Iron Workers refused to relinquish this work the AFL suspended it from membership in 1917. Other unions, such as the Lathers, then claimed that work that had historically been done by iron workers belonged to them instead. Unable to call on the support of other AFL unions in its fights with employers, the Iron Workers relented the following year and ceded pile driving work, with the exception of work related to bridge building, to the Carpenters.

These fissures contributed to an extent to the failure of the Iron Workers' New York City strike, called in 1921 to resist the American Plan, the open shop movement that reversed much of the labor movement's gains, particularly in construction, of the previous decade. When the strike failed, the union sued the employers, also without success. The union survived, but in a much weaker state.

The union also fought the Industrial Workers of the World, which had won leadership in a number of its west coast locals in the era after World War I. International President Morrin expelled some dissident locals and sued others to regain the locals' property. By 1928 the rebellion was over.

== The Great Depression and the New Deal ==
The union lost roughly half of its members in the early 1930s. While the passage of the Davis–Bacon Act required payment of the prevailing wage on federal construction projects, the desperate shortage of work allowed some employers to force their employees to pay kickbacks to them to hold on to their jobs. A number of union members hopped freight cars to go in search for work. At the same time the union's old enemy, the Carpenters union, resumed its jurisdictional war with it.

Conditions improved somewhat with the advent of the New Deal and the Roosevelt administration's creation of the Works Progress Administration, a public works project that employed thousands of iron workers and other construction workers. The union was also spurred to organize, particularly in the inside fabricating shops, by the threat of competition from the newly created Congress of Industrial Organizations. The union's membership grew slowly, reaching 40,000 by 1940.

== World War II, the postwar boom and change ==
Membership (US records)
View chart definition.
Finances (US records; ×$1000)
View chart definition.

The union grew even more rapidly during World War II and the years afterward, reaching 100,000 members by 1948, when John H. Lyons succeeded Morrin as president of the union. His son, John H. Lyons, Jr., succeeded him in 1961.

The Taft-Hartley Act, passed in 1947, limited construction unions' rights to picket worksites at which non-union contractors were working by barring secondary boycotts. Even with those restrictions, however, the Iron Workers continued to grow in the expansive economy of the 1950s.

The union, like most other United States construction unions, had remained nearly all-white for most of its history. That began to change in the early 1960s, as the American civil rights movement began to challenge employment discrimination in the north, then picked up steam in the 1970s as the federal government began using the Civil Rights Act of 1964 to knock down some of the barriers to African-American workers' entry into the industry. Some local unions of the Iron Workers fought integration and affirmative action tenaciously, but usually unsuccessfully.

The union also found itself challenged by a change in the business climate in the 1970s, as non-union contractors invaded markets that had been solidly union for years with the support of the Business Roundtable, made up of the heads of General Motors, General Electric, Exxon, U.S. Steel, DuPont and others. The Roundtable also attempted to weaken the Davis-Bacon Act and other legislation that protected construction workers. The Iron Workers and other building trades, caught off guard and used to organizing from the top down, lost large amounts of work to non-union contractors in the decades that followed.

== Twenty-first century controversies ==
The union's International President, Jake West, pleaded guilty in 2002 to improper use of pension funds and making a false statement on a union report filed with the United States Department of Labor. Joseph Hunt succeeded him. A number of lower-level officers and the union's accounting firm likewise pleaded guilty to related embezzlement and disclosure charges. Fitch described West's guilty plea as part of a pattern of corruption in the Ironworkers, as he was one of "nine top officials" investigated or indicted for crimes between 1999 and 2002.

== Composition ==
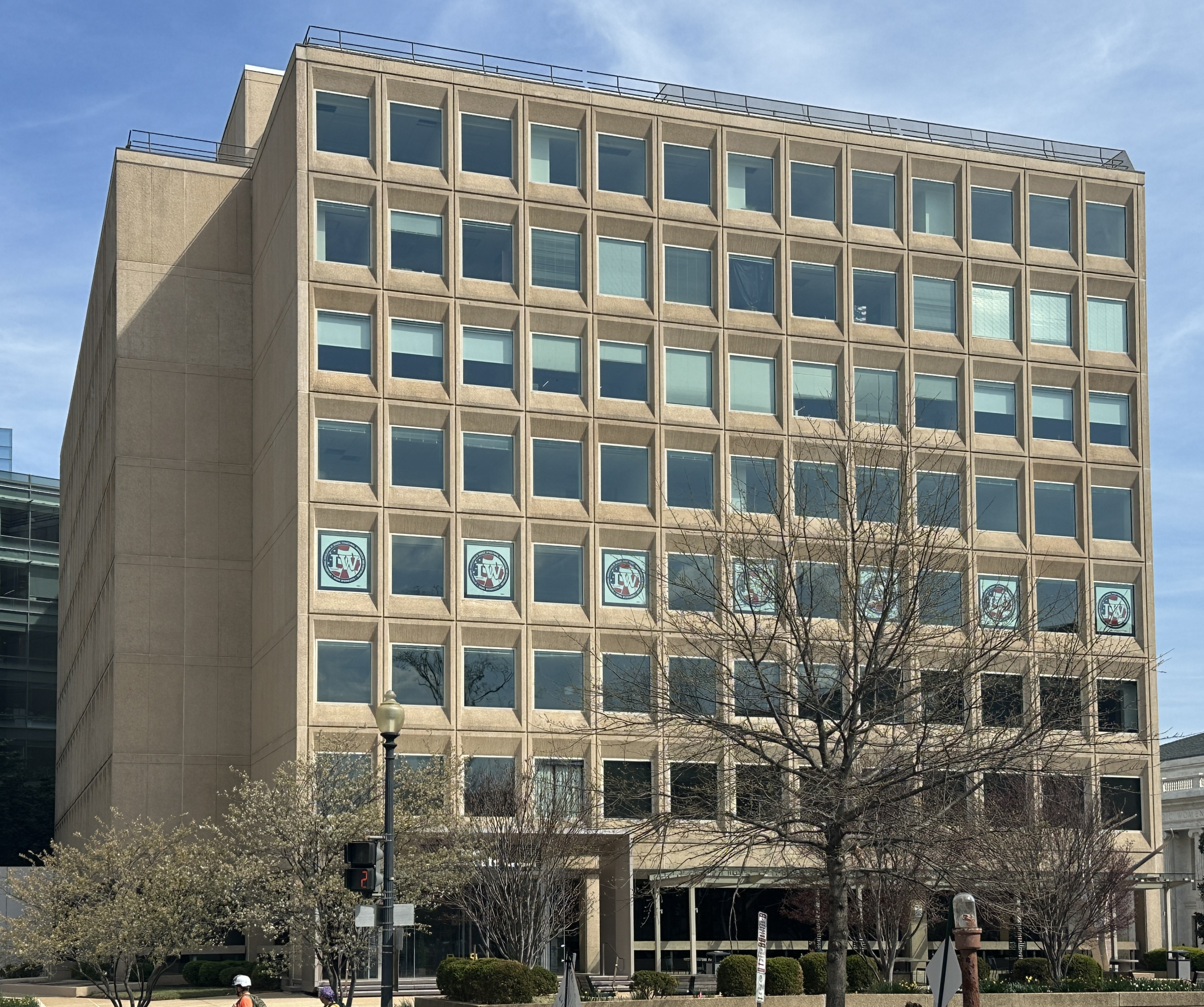
International Association of Bridge, Structural, Ornamental and Reinforcing Iron Workers headquarters in Washington, D.C.

According to the union's Department of Labor records since 2005, the union has reported several types of membership classifications, with the majority eligible to vote in the union, and (overall average for the period) 12% ineligible to vote. Throughout the period, "journeymen" have been the largest category (period average of 56%), followed by "lifetime honorary" members (period average 16%), followed by "apprentices" and "shopmen" (period average 9% each).

As of 2014 the number of members in each of these categories are about 21,000 "lifetime honorary" members (17% of total), 12,000 "apprentices" (9%), 11,000 "shopmen" (9%), 8,000 "honorary" members (6%), 2,000 "probationary" members (2%), 1,000 "retired shopmen" (1%), 1,000 "trainees" (1%), 322 "riggers" (<1%), 120 "military" members (<1%) and 15 "navy retirees" (<1%), plus 3 non-members paying agency fees, compared to about 67,000 "journeymen" (54%). Members classified as "apprentices," "probationary," "trainees," "retired shopmen" and "navy retirees" are ineligible to vote in the union.

== District Councils ==
Canada
- Ontario
- Eastern Canada
- Western Canada
United States
- Chicago and Vicinity
- Mid-Atlantic States
- New England States
- New York State
- North Central States
- Northern Ohio, Western Pennsylvania and Northern West Virginia
- Southern Ohio and Vicinity
- Pacific Northwest
- Philadelphia and Vicinity
- Regional (Florida)
- Rocky Mountain Area
- Southeastern States
- St. Louis and Vicinity
- Tennessee Valley and Vicinity
- Texas and the Mid-South States
- State of California and Vicinity

== Presidents ==
1896: Edward Ryan
1899: John Butler
1901: Frank Buchanan
1905: Frank Ryan
1914: James McClory
1918: Paddy Morrin
1948: Jack Lyons
1961: John H. Lyons, Jr.
1987: Juel Drake
1989: Jake West
2001: Joseph J. Hunt
2010: Walter Wise
2015: Eric Dean

== Local unions ==
Canada

Alberta

- Local 720 – Edmonton
- Local 725 – Calgary
- Local 805 – Calgary

British Columbia

- Local 97 – Burnaby
- Local 643 – Victoria
- Local 712 – Vancouver

Manitoba

- Local 728 – Winnipeg

New Brunswick

- Local 809 – St. John
- Local 842 – St. John

Newfoundland

- Local 764 – St. Johns

Nova Scotia

- Local 752 – Halifax

Ontario

- Local 700 – Windsor
- Local 721 – Toronto
- Local 736 – Hamilton
- Local 759 – Thunder Bay
- Local 765 – Ottawa
- Local 786 – Sudbury
- Local 834 – Toronto

Quebec

- Local 711 – Montreal

Saskatchewan

- Local 771 – Regina
- Local 838 – Regina

United States

Alabama

- Local 92 – Birmingham
- Local 477 – Sheffield
- Local 798 – Mobile

Alaska

- Local 751 – Anchorage

Arizona

- Local 75 – Phoenix
- Local 847 – Phoenix

Arkansas

- Local 321 – Little Rock

California

- Local 118 – Sacramento
- Local 155 – Fresno
- Local 229 – San Diego
- Local 377 – San Francisco
- Local 378 – Oakland
- Local 416 – Los Angeles/Las Vegas
- Local 433 – Los Angeles/Las Vegas
- Local 509 – Los Angeles
- Local 624 – Fresno
- Local 790 – San Francisco/Oakland
- Local 844 – Hercules

Colorado

- Local 24 – Denver

Connecticut

- Local 15 – Hartford
- Local 424 – New Haven
- Local 832 – Meriden

Delaware

- Local 451 – Wilmington

District of Columbia

- Local 5 – Washington
- Local 201 – Washington

Florida

- Local 272 – Miami
- Local 397 – Tampa
- Local 402 – West Palm Beach
- Local 597 – Jacksonville
- Local 698 – Miami
- Local 808 – Orlando
- Local 846 – Lakeland

Georgia

- Local 387 – Atlanta
- Local 709 – Savannah

Hawaii

- Local 625 – Honolulu
- Local 742 – Honolulu
- Local 803 – Honolulu

Idaho

- Local 732 – Pocatello

Illinois

- Local 1 – Chicago
- Local 46 – Springfield
- Local 63 – Chicago
- Local 111 – Rock Island
- Local 112 – Peoria
- Local 136 – Chicago
- Local 380 – Champaign
- Local 392 – East St. Louis
- Local 393 – Aurora
- Local 444 – Joliet
- Local 473 – Chicago
- Local 498 – Rockford
- Local 590 – Aurora

Indiana

- Local 22 – Indianapolis
- Local 103 – Evansville
- Local 147 – Ft. Wayne
- Local 292 – South Bend
- Local 395 – Hammond
- Local 585 – Vincennes
- Local 726 – Ft. Wayne

Iowa

- Local 67 – Des Moines
- Local 89 – Cedar Rapids
- Local 493 – Des Moines
- Local 577 – Burlington

Kentucky

- Local 70 – Louisville
- Local 769 – Ashland
- Local 782 – Paducah

Louisiana

- Local 58 – New Orleans
- Local 623 – Baton Rouge

Maine

- Local 807 – Winslow

Maryland

- Local 16 – Baltimore
- Local 568 – Cumberland

Massachusetts

- Local 7 – Boston
- Local 501 – Boston

Michigan

- Local 25 – Detroit
- Local 340 – Battle Creek
- Local 508 – Detroit
- Local 831 – Wayne

Minnesota

- Local 512 – Minneapolis/St. Paul
- Local 535 – Minneapolis/St. Paul

Missouri

- Local 10 – Kansas City
- Local 396 – St. Louis
- Local 518 – St. Louis
- Local 520 – Kansas City

Mississippi

- Local 469 – Jackson

Nebraska

- Local 21 – Omaha
- Local 553 – Omaha

New Hampshire

- Local 745 – Portsmouth

New Jersey

- Local 11 – Newark
- Local 68 – Trenton
- Local 350 – Atlantic City
- Local 399 – Camden

New Mexico

- Local 495 – Albuquerque

New York

- Local 6 – Buffalo
- Local 9 – Niagara Falls
- Local 12 – Albany
- Local 33 – Rochester
- Local 40 – New York
- Local 46L – New York
- Local 60 – Syracuse
- Local 197 – New York
- Local 361 – Brooklyn
- Local 417 – Newburgh
- Local 440 – Utica
- Local 470 – Jamestown
- Local 576 – Buffalo
- Local 580 – New York
- Local 612 – Syracuse
- Local 824 – Gouverneur

North Carolina

- Local 812 – Asheville

Ohio

- Local 17 – Cleveland
- Local 44 – Cincinnati
- Local 55 – Toledo
- Local 172 – Columbus
- Local 207 – Youngstown
- Local 290 – Dayton
- Local 372 – Cincinnati
- Local 468 – Cleveland
- Local 499 – Toledo
- Local 522 – Cincinnati
- Local 550 – Canton

Oklahoma

- Local 48 – Oklahoma City
- Local 584 – Tulsa

Oregon

- Local 29 – Portland
- Local 516 – Portland

Pennsylvania

- Local 3 – Pittsburgh
- Local 36 – Easton
- Local 401 – Philadelphia
- Local 404 – Harrisburg
- Local 405 – Philadelphia
- Local 420 – Reading
- Local 489 – Scranton
- Local 502 – Philadelphia
- Local 521 – Scranton
- Local 527 – Pittsburgh

Rhode Island

- Local 37 – Providence
- Local 523 – Pawtucket

South Carolina

- Local 848 – Charleston

Tennessee

- Local 167 – Memphis
- Local 384 – Knoxville
- Local 492 – Nashville
- Local 526 – Chattanooga
- Local 704 – Chattanooga

Texas

- Local 66 – San Antonio
- Local 84 – Houston
- Local 135 – Galveston
- Local 263 – Dallas/Ft. Worth
- Local 482 – Austin
- Local 536 – Dallas

Utah

- Local 27 – Salt Lake City

Virginia

- Local 28 – Richmond
- Local 228 – Portsmouth
- Local 79 – Norfolk

Washington

- Local 14 – Spokane
- Local 86 – Seattle
- Local 506 – Seattle

West Virginia

- Local 301 – Charleston
- Local 549 – Wheeling
- Local 787 – Parkersburg

Wisconsin

- Local 8 – Milwaukee
- Local 383 – Madison
- Local 665 – Madison
- Local 811 – Wausau
- Local 825 – La Crosse
- Local 849 – Luck

== See also ==
- Ironworker Management Progressive Action Cooperative Trust
