= Edward Smith (trade unionist) =

American labor leader (1954–2024)

Edward M. Smith
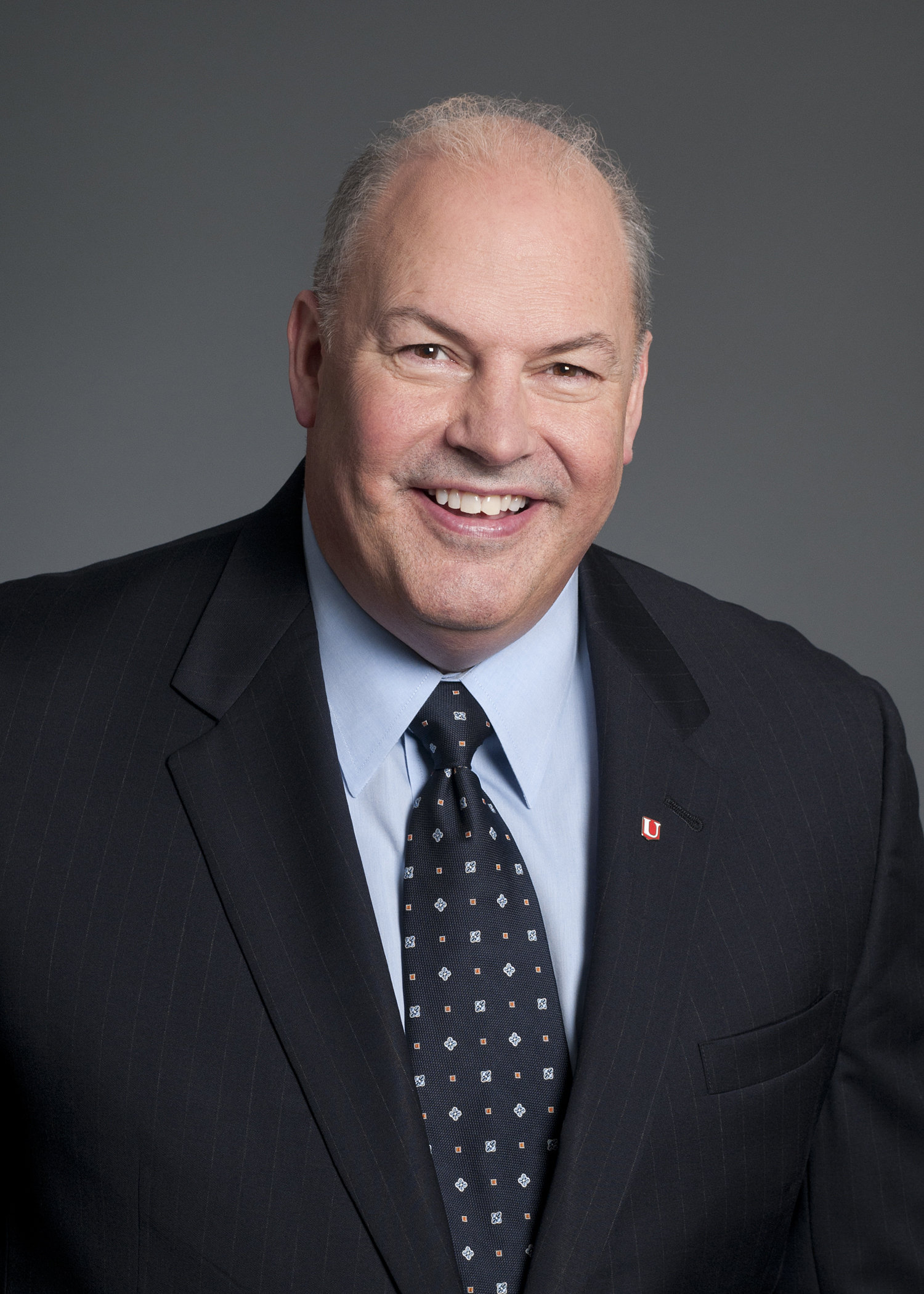
- Born: 1954; Cairo, Illinois, United States
- Died: 2024 (aged 69–70)
- Occupations: CEO and Chairman of the Board of Ullico Inc.

Edward M. Smith (1954–2024) was an American labor leader who served as the CEO and chairman of the Board of Ullico Inc, a labor-owned insurance and investment company headquartered in Washington, D.C.

== Labor ==
In 1981, Edward M. Smith was appointed International Representative for the Laborers' International Union of North America (LIUNA) and was later appointed LIUNA Legislative Director for the State of Illinois. Smith was elected President of the Southern Illinois Laborers' District Council in 1986 and Business Manager in 1990.

Smith served as Midwest Regional Manager of LIUNA from 1994 to 2008. He was elected a Vice President of the International Union in 1996 and served on the International's General Executive Board. In 2001, Smith was appointed as Assistant to the General President for the International Union.

On January 3, 2011, Smith was named Chief Executive Officer of The Union Labor Life Insurance Company (Ullico Inc.), a labor-owned insurance and investment company headquartered in Washington, D.C. He had been serving as the company's president since May 2008 and previously served as executive vice president in 2007 while maintaining full-time duties with LIUNA.

Smith was the former Chairman of the Illinois State Board of Investment, served as a member of the Illinois Department of Labor Advisory Board, the Democratic National Committee, and was Chairman of the National Alliance for Fair Contracting.

Smith serves on the boards of America's Agenda-Healthcare for All, Jobs with Justice, the Council on Competitiveness, and is a trustee for the AFL-CIO Staff Retirement Plan.

== Education ==
Smith a graduate of Shawnee Community College in Ullin IL, was the first member of the Laborers' International Union to graduate from the National Labor College with a bachelor's degree. He was an active board member for the college.

In 1978, Smith graduated from the Harvard Trade Union Program.

== Politics ==
Smith was a delegate to the Democratic National Convention from Illinois in 2000 and 2004. He was an at-large Superdelegate to the 2008 Democratic National Convention.

Business positions
Preceded by Joseph J. Hunt	Chairman of the Board of Ullico; 2023–present	Succeeded by Incumbent
