= John J. Grogan =

American politician

John Joseph Grogan (March 25, 1914 – September 16, 1968) was an American labor union leader and politician.

Born in Hoboken, New Jersey, Grogan became a pipefitters' assistant. He saw a dock worker killed in an accident involving a crane, and this inspired him to join the United Association union. He became a shop steward when only 19 years old. He attended Columbia University for a single year.

In 1936, Grogan joined the new Industrial Union of Marine and Shipbuilding Workers of America (IUMSWA), holding various posts in his local union. In 1941, he was elected as the union's national vice-president, and from 1943, he served on the executive committee of the Congress of Industrial Organizations.

Grogan served in the United States Army during World War II. From 1943 to 1947, he also served in the New Jersey General Assembly, for the Democratic Party. In 1947, he became a city commissioner in Hoboken, and director of the city's Parks and Public Buildings Department.

In 1951, Grogan was elected as the president of IUMSWA. In 1953, he was additionally elected as Mayor of Hoboken, serving until 1965. He attempted to win the Democratic nomination for the United States Senate in 1958, but was defeated in the primary. In 1961, he put his name forward to become state governor, but withdrew when he did not gain the support of the state Democratic Party. In 1963, he was elected as Clerk of Hudson County, New Jersey.

Grogan was elected as a vice-president of the AFL-CIO. He was active in the Association of Catholic Trade Unionists, and strongly opposed communism. He served as a personal envoy of John F. Kennedy, and represented the United States at the United Nations Worldwide Human Rights Conference in Tehran. He died in 1968, while still holding his union posts.

Trade union offices
Preceded by John Green	President of the Industrial Union of Marine and Shipbuilding Workers of America; 1951–1968	Succeeded by Andrew Pettis
Preceded by Max Greenberg; David Sullivan	AFL-CIO delegate to the Trades Union Congress; 1965; With: John H. Lyons, Jr.	Succeeded by Paul Hall; William J. Farson
Civic offices
Preceded by Fred M. De Sapio	Mayor of Hoboken; 1953–1965	Succeeded by Louis De Pascale
