= Retail, Wholesale and Department Store Union, Local 558 v Pepsi-Cola Canada Beverages (West) Ltd =

- Supreme Court of Canada

Hearing: October 31, 2000 Judgment: January 24, 2002
- Citations: [2002] 1 SCR 156, 208 DLR (4th) 385, 4 WWR 205, 90 CRR (2d) 189, 217 Sask R 22
- Docket No.: 27060
- Ruling: dismissed

Court membership
- Chief Justice: Beverley McLachlin; Puisne Justices: Claire L'Heureux-Dubé, Charles Gonthier, Frank Iacobucci, John C. Major, Michel Bastarache, Ian Binnie, Louise Arbour, Louis LeBel

Reasons given
- Unanimous reasons by: McLachlin CJ and LeBel J

Retail, Wholesale and Department Store Union, Local 558 v Pepsi-Cola Canada Beverages (West) Ltd [2002] 1 S.C.R. 156, 2002 SCC 8, is a leading Supreme Court of Canada decision on secondary picketing. The Court held that at common law, secondary picketing is legal so long as there is no criminal or tortious conduct.

== Background ==
Employees of PepsiCo ("Pepsi"), organized by the Retail, Wholesale and Department Store Union, in Saskatchewan went on strike. Unlike many other provinces, Saskatchewan did not have any secondary picketing legislation. So as part of their strike, the employees picketed at retail stores that sold Pepsi products and the homes of Pepsi's management. Pepsi successfully applied for an interlocutory injunction to prevent employees from picketing at the secondary locations. The employees appealed the injunction.

== Ruling ==
The Court recognized picketing as freedom of expression, consistent with section 2(b) of the Canadian Charter of Rights and Freedoms. Since the Court found picketing to be ingrained in the Charter, they declined to limit picketing based on location. The Court felt that the limited financial and human resources of labour unions would prevent the unchecked spread of picketing beyond the primary parties, with limited resources they felt it was unlikely the union would picket a location which has no possible impact on their labour dispute.

Pepsi had relied primarily on the Court of Appeal for Ontario decision Hersees of Woodstock Ltd v Goldstein (1963), 2 OR 81 (CA), which held that all secondary picketing was illegal. However, the Supreme Court overturned the decision but expressly forbade the picketing of the management's homes.

The Court's overall conclusion was that secondary picketing is legal so long as it is not tortious or criminal in nature and does not inflict "undue" hardship on the struck parties.

== See also ==
- List of Supreme Court of Canada cases (McLachlin Court)
