= Max Greenberg (unionist) =

Max Greenberg's Biography

Max Greenberg (August 6, 1907 – December 12, 1992) was an American labor union leader.

Born in New York City, Greenberg attended Pace College, but left without graduating due to financial difficulties. He became a retail clerk, and joined a local union representing men involved in selling furnishings. In 1936, he organized a New Jersey local of the Retail Clerks' International Protective Association, and became its president. However, he was enthused by the formation of the Retail, Wholesale and Department Store Union (RWDSU) the following year, and led the union local into that new international union.

Greenberg served on the regional War Labor Board during World War II. In 1946, he was elected as vice-president of the RWDSU, and from 1949, he also served on the New Jersey Board of Mediation. In 1954, he won election as president of the union, and he was also appointed to the general board of the Congress of Industrial Organizations (CIO). The CIO merged into the AFL-CIO, with Greenberg joining its executive council, and in 1967, Greenberg was also appointed as one of its vice-presidents. He retired in 1975, moving to Boca Raton, Florida two years later.

Trade union offices
Preceded by Irving Simon	President of the Retail, Wholesale and Department Store Union; 1954–1975	Succeeded by Alvin Heaps
Preceded by Anthony J. DeAndrade; William J. Farson	AFL-CIO delegate to the Trades Union Congress; 1964; With: David Sullivan	Succeeded by John J. Grogan; John H. Lyons, Jr.
Preceded by Peter Bommarito; Martin Ward	AFL-CIO delegate to the Trades Union Congress; 1974; With: James Housewright	Succeeded by William Sidell; Sol Stetin
