= Sam Lyon =

English footballer

Personal information
- Full name: Samuel Lyon
- Date of birth: 20 November 1890
- Place of birth: Prescot, England
- Date of death: December 1977 (aged 87)
- Place of death: Cottingham, England
- Position: Centre forward

Senior career*
Years	Team	Apps	(Gls)
–1912	Prescot		
1912–1914	Hull City	6	(1)
1914–1915	Barnsley	8	(3)
- * Club domestic league appearances and goals

Samuel Lyon (born 20 November 1890 – December 1977) was an English professional footballer who played in the Football League for Barnsley and Hull City as a centre forward.

== Personal life ==
Lyon's younger brother, Jack, also became a footballer. After service in the Territorial Army from 1909 and 1913, Lyon served in the East Yorkshire Regiment during the First World War, where he sustained wounds which required him spending 15 months in hospital. After the war, he worked as a wholesale fish merchant and played bowls, at which he represented Yorkshire.

== Career statistics ==
Appearances and goals by club, season and competition
Club	Season	League			FA Cup		Total	
Club	Season	Division	Apps	Goals	Apps	Goals	Apps	Goals
Hull City	1912–13	Second Division	5	1	0	0	5	1
Hull City	1913–14	Second Division	1	0	0	0	1	0
Hull City	Total		6	1	0	0	6	1
Barnsley	1914–15	Second Division	8	3	0	0	8	3
Career total			14	4	0	0	14	4
