= 1984–85 Eaton's strike =

Labour dispute in Ontario, Canada

The 1984–85 Eaton's strike began on 30 November 1984 with 1,500 newly unionized workers at six Eaton's department stores in southern Ontario. They were members of the Retail, Wholesale and Department Store Union (RWDSU). The strike ended in mid-May 1985. The strikers won a first contract but with limited changes in working conditions. However, as a result of the strike, the provincial government introduced arbitration legislation. Eventually, all six shops decertified.
