= Retail, Wholesale and Department Store Union =

American trade union

- Abbreviation: RWDSU
- Formation: 1937
- Type: Trade union
- Headquarters: New York City, New York, US
- Location: United States
- Members: 60,522 (2014)
- President: Stuart Appelbaum
- Affiliations: AFL–CIO; IUF; UNI Global Union; United Food and Commercial Workers
- Website: rwdsu.org

Retail, Wholesale and Department Store Union (RWDSU) is a labor union in the United States and Canada. Founded in 1937, the RWDSU represents about 60,000 workers in a wide range of industries, including but not limited to retail, grocery stores, poultry processing, dairy processing, cereal processing, soda bottlers, bakeries, health care, hotels, manufacturing, public sector workers like crossing guards, sanitation, and highway workers, warehouses, building services, and distribution.

== History ==
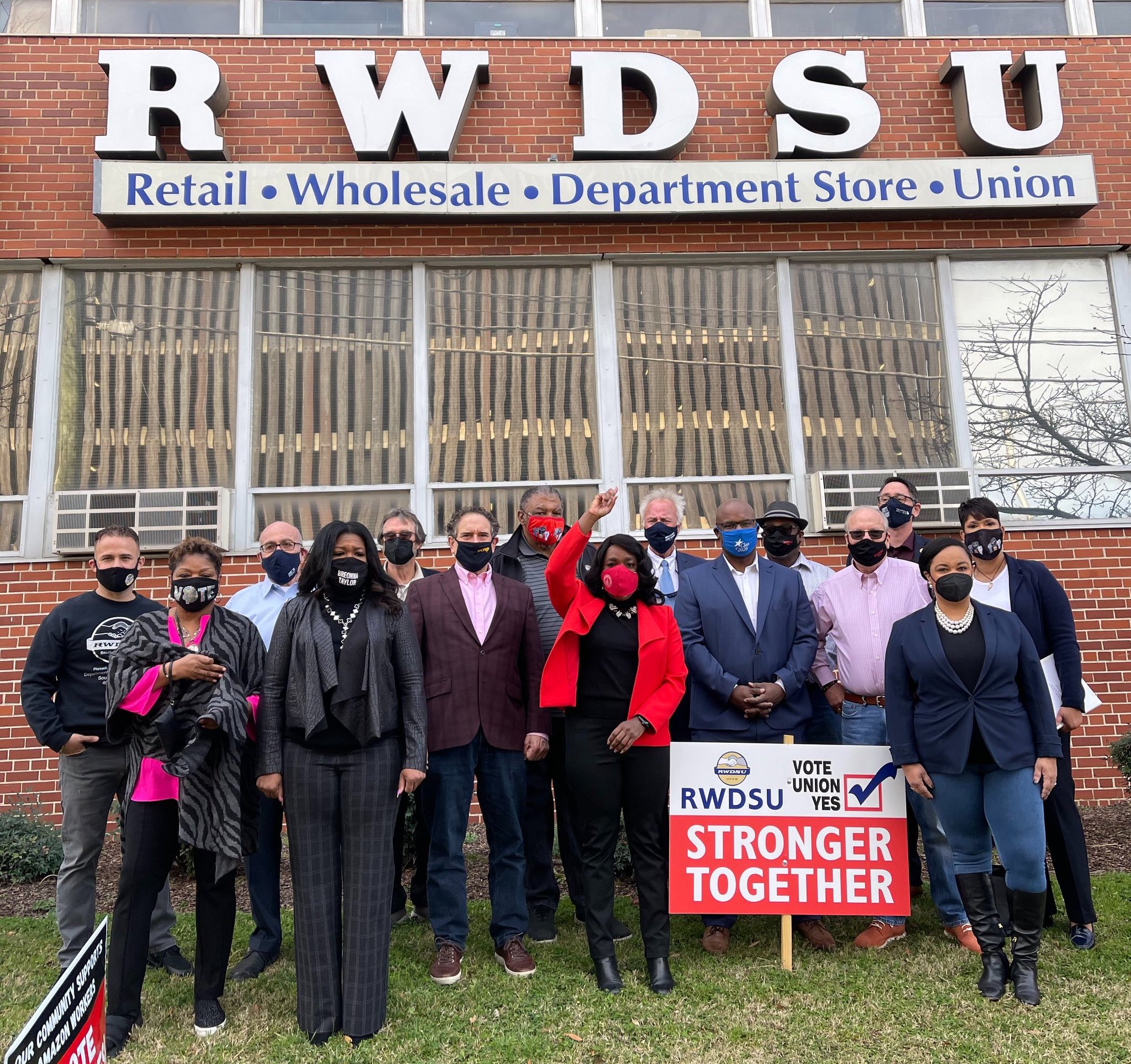
Members of the United States Congress meeting with RWDSU members, in 2021, to support the union's efforts to unionize the Amazon facility in Bessemer, Alabama.

=== Montgomery Ward strike (1940s) ===
In 1943, the union organized a labor strike at the Montgomery Ward & Co. department store, after company management refused to comply with a War Labor Board order to recognize the union and institute the terms of a collective bargaining agreement the board had worked out. The strike involved nearly 12,000 workers in Jamaica, New York; Detroit, Michigan; Chicago, Illinois; St. Paul, Minnesota; Denver, Colorado; San Rafael, California; and Portland, Oregon. Ward's then cut wages and fired many union activists, with company chairman Sewell Avery later alleging "government has been coercing both employers and employees to accept a brand of unionism which in all too many cases is engineered by people who are not employees of the plant".

On April 26, 1944, President Franklin D. Roosevelt ordered US Army troops to seize the company's property in Chicago and remove Avery, who was forced out of his office by two troops. This ouster of Avery was based on charges he was impeding distribution of vital products during war. Jesse Holman Jones, the United States Secretary of Commerce, was installed as manager of the company's Chicago plant.

The workers again chose (via a National Labor Relations Board election) to form a collective bargaining organization in the summer of 1944, but Montgomery Ward continued to refuse to recognize the union. On December 27, 1944, Roosevelt issued an executive order authorizing the Secretary of War to seize all company property nationwide to force compliance with War Labor Board orders. The seizure was upheld by a United States Court of Appeals (United States v. Montgomery Ward & Co., 150 C. 2d 369), but the seizure was terminated in 1945 by President Harry S. Truman.

Despite the federal government's intervention, RWDSU never did achieve a firm foothold at Montgomery Ward. Union membership at the company dropped to zero by 1948.

The Montgomery Ward strike only strengthened the criticism coming from the union's locals, who accused the national leadership of incompetence in the planning and conduct of the strike.

=== Post-war period of merger and disaffiliation ===
In 1954, the Distributive, Processing, and Office Workers of America (itself formed from the merger of the United Office and Professional Workers of America; the Food, Tobacco and Agricultural Workers Union; and locals that had left the RWDSU 4 years ago), merged with the RWDSU. It also absorbed the Playthings, Jewelry and Novelty Workers' International Union.

In 1969, ten of the largest local unions (representing 40,000 members) belonging to the Retail, Wholesale and Department Store Union disaffiliated from that international union, formed a new union (the National Council of Distributive Workers of America), and joined the Alliance for Labor Action. The Distributive Workers joined the United Auto Workers in 1979.

In 1974, the Cigar Makers International Union, Samuel Gompers' old union, merged with RWDSU.

1199: The National Health Care Workers' Union was, for a time, affiliated with the RWDSU.

=== Merger with UFCW (1993 to present) ===
In 2017, the House of Representatives Subcommittee on Health, Employment, Labor, and Pensions held a hearing on labor law reform in which Karen Cox, an Illinois forklift operator for Americold Logistics, testified in favor of the proposed Employee Rights Act. She alleged that RWDSU Local 578 pressured or tricked several of her co-workers into signing authorization cards to join the union, rather than participating in a secret ballot. Following the voluntary recognition of the union by Americold, Ms. Cox filed a successful decertification petition. After the decertification election, RWDSU filed an appeal with the National Labor Relations Board. The NLRB ultimately upheld the unionization at Americold, throwing out the uncounted ballots from the decertification election.

In 2019, Amazon cancelled its plans to build a corporate headquarters, HQ2, in Queens, New York City, after strong opposition from some local politicians, activists, and the RWDSU. The day before Amazon announced pulling out, union personnel met with Amazon executives to ask Amazon to remain neutral toward unionization at its new Staten Island distribution center, where employees were attempting to unionize. According to The New York Times, "There is no evidence that the union issue was the primary factor in Amazon’s decision."

In 2020, workers at an Amazon fulfillment center in Bessemer, Alabama, petitioned to form a bargaining unit representing the facility's 1,500 employees. If the petition is successful, the union formed would be the first to represent Amazon employees in the United States. Workers at the Amazon facility voted over 2-to-1 against the unionization drive according to preliminary calculations, and the RWDSU has alleged improprieties by Amazon.

Membership (US records)
View chart definition.
Finances (US records; ×$1000)
View chart definition.

== Presidents ==
1937: Samuel Wolchok
1949: Irving Simon
1954: Max Greenberg
1976: Alvin Heaps
1986: Lenore Miller
1998: Stuart Appelbaum

== See also ==
- RWDSU v. Dolphin Delivery Ltd.
- R.W.D.S.U., Local 558 v. Pepsi-Cola Canada Beverages (West) Ltd.
- Impact of the 2019–20 coronavirus pandemic on the meat industry in the United States
- 1984–85 Eaton's strike
