= John H. Lyons Jr. =

John H. Lyons (October 29, 1919 – October 26, 1986) was an American labor union leader.

Born in Cleveland, Lyons grew up in St. Louis. He was the son of Jack Lyons (John H. Lyons Sr.), who was active in the International Association of Bridge, Structural, Ornamental and Reinforcing Iron Workers (IABSOIW).

Lyons worked in the iron industry while studying mechanical engineering at the University of Missouri School of Mines. In 1937, he joined the IABSOIW. During World War II, he served in the United States Air Force, then after the war, he worked for the General Bronze Corporation in New York City.

In 1954, Lyons began working full-time for the IABSOIW full-time as a general organizer, his father at this point having become president. The following year, he was put in charge of the union's Washington D.C. office. In 1959, Lyons was elected as a vice-president of the union, then in 1961 he succeeded his father as president. He sat on numerous government committees, including serving as chair of the labor advisory committee of the President's Committee on Equal Employment Opportunity. In 1967, he was also elected as a vice-president of the AFL-CIO.

In 1972, Lyons moved the union's headquarters from St. Louis to Washington. In the 1980s, he was the only labor member of Reagan's Scowcroft Commission, while in 1984, he was co-chair of the National Democratic Party Platform Committee. He retired in 1985, and died the following year.

Trade union offices
Preceded by Jack Lyons	President of the International Association of Bridge, Structural, Ornamental and Reinforcing Iron Workers; 1961–1985	Succeeded by Juel Drake
Preceded by Max Greenberg; David Sullivan	AFL-CIO delegate to the Trades Union Congress; 1965; With: John J. Grogan	Succeeded by Paul Hall; William J. Farson
Preceded by Glenn Watts	AFL-CIO delegate to the Trades Union Congress; 1979	Succeeded by Frederick O'Neal
