= Jack Lyons (unionist) =

American labor union leader (1891–1961)

John H. Lyons (June 29, 1891 – October 26, 1961) was an American labor union leader.

Born in South Norwalk, Connecticut, Lyons became an iron worker in 1916, and joined an independent local union. He later moved to Cleveland, where he joined the International Association of Bridge, Structural, Ornamental and Reinforcing Iron Workers. He soon became financial secretary-treasurer of his local union. In 1928, he was elected as treasurer of the international union, moving to St. Louis to take up the post.

In 1949, Lyons was elected as president of his union. In the role, he helped found the construction industry joint conference, and a national board for settling jurisdictional disputes. He also served as a vice-president of the Metal Trades Department of the American Federation of Labor, and on various government committees. He died in 1961, while still in office, with Arthur J. Goldberg describing him as "one of the most highly talented and dedicated labor statesmen I have had the good fortune to know".

Lyons was succeeded as president of the union by his son, John H. Lyons, Jr.

Trade union offices
Preceded by Paddy Morrin	President of the International Association of Bridge, Structural, Ornamental and Reinforcing Iron Workers; 1949–1961	Succeeded by John H. Lyons, Jr.
