= John F. West =

American environmentalist (1920–2001)

John F. West (1920–2001), was an American environmental activist in Marin County, California. John and his wife Anne West were both active in local environmental issues in Marin County for several decades. John West was largely responsible for restoring the salmon spawning grounds in the area of Olema Creek and surrounding areas. In contribution to John's efforts, the creek, which at one point was called "Blue Line Creek", was renamed and is now commonly referred to as, "The John West Fork" of Olema Creek.

The work and efforts of John and Anne West are carried on through the Tomales Bay Association.
