= Jake West (unionist) =

Jake West (May 29, 1928 – April 5, 2007) was an American labor union leader, who was convicted of embezzlement.

West joined the International Association of Bridge, Structural, Ornamental and Reinforcing Iron Workers in 1948, while he was working in Charleston, West Virginia. In 1951, he moved to work in Los Angeles, and in 1961 he was elected as the business agent of his local union. In 1971, West was appointed as an international organizer for the union, serving until 1983 when he was elected as an international vice-president, and also as president of the Iron Workers District Council in California.

West was elected as secretary of the union in 1985, and as president in 1989. In 1995, he was additionally elected as a vice-president of the AFL-CIO. He retired in 2001. By this point, the union had become aware that West had been embezzling money, thought to total more than $500,000. In 2002, he admitted one charge of embezzling money from a pension fund, to bribe the union's secretary, Leroy Worley, to retire and not stand against West. At trial the following year, he attempted to have the plea thrown out, but was instead sentenced to three years in prison and a fine of $125,000. The judge stated that the penalty was less severe due to West's age and poor health, as he was being treated for leukemia.

Trade union offices
Preceded by Juel Drake	President of the International Association of Bridge, Structural, Ornamental and Reinforcing Iron Workers; 1989–2001	Succeeded by Joseph J. Hunt
