= John C. West (philatelist) =

British engineer, academic administrator, and philatelist (1922–2016)

John C. West CBE FRPSL FREng
- Born: John Clifford West; June 1922
- Died: October 2016 (aged 94)
- Occupations: Academic; philatelist
- Title: Vice-chancellor of the University of Bradford (1978–1989)
- Spouse: Winefride (m. 1946)

Academic background
- Education: University of Manchester

Academic work
- Discipline: Engineering
- Sub-discipline: Electrical engineering
- Institutions: University of Manchester; Queen's University Belfast; University of Sussex; University of Bradford

John Clifford West (June 1922 – October 2016) was president of the Institution of Electrical Engineers and vice-chancellor of the University of Bradford. He was a philatelist who specialised in Chile and was appointed to the Roll of Distinguished Philatelists in 2000. He was a fellow of the Institute of Paper Conservation and the Royal Philatelic Society London.

== Selected publications ==
- Post Marks of Valparaiso (joint author)
