= Jack Lyon (footballer) =

English footballer

Personal information
- Full name: John Lyon
- Date of birth: 3 November 1893
- Place of birth: Prescot, England
- Date of death: 1975 (aged 81–82)
- Height: 1.79 m (5 ft 10 in)
- Position: Forward

Senior career*
Years	Team	Apps	(Gls)
–1912	Prescot Athletic		
1913–1919	Hull City	37	(6)
1920–1921	Leeds United	33	(3)
1921–1923	Prescot		
1923–1924	New Brighton	28	(5)
1924–1926	Mold Town		
1926–1927	Prescot		

Managerial career
- 1926–1927: Prescot
- * Club domestic league appearances and goals

John Lyon (3 November 1893 – 1975) was an English professional footballer who played as a forward in the Football League for Hull City, Leeds United and New Brighton. He ended his career with a player-manager spell at Prescot, a non-League club with whom he had had a long association.

== Personal life ==
Lyon's older brother Sam also became a footballer.

== Career statistics ==
Appearances and goals by club, season and competition
Club	Season	League			FA Cup		Total	
Club	Season	Division	Apps	Goals	Apps	Goals	Apps	Goals
Hull City	1913–14	Second Division	23	4	2	0	25	4
Hull City	1914–15	Second Division	1	0	0	0	1	0
Hull City	1919–20	Second Division	13	2	0	0	13	2
Hull City	Total		37	6	2	0	39	6
Leeds United	1920–21	Second Division	33	3	0	0	33	3
Career total			70	9	2	0	72	9

== Honours ==
Mold Town

- Welsh National League (North): 1924–25
