= Industrial Union of Marine and Shipbuilding Workers of America =

Former trade union of the United States

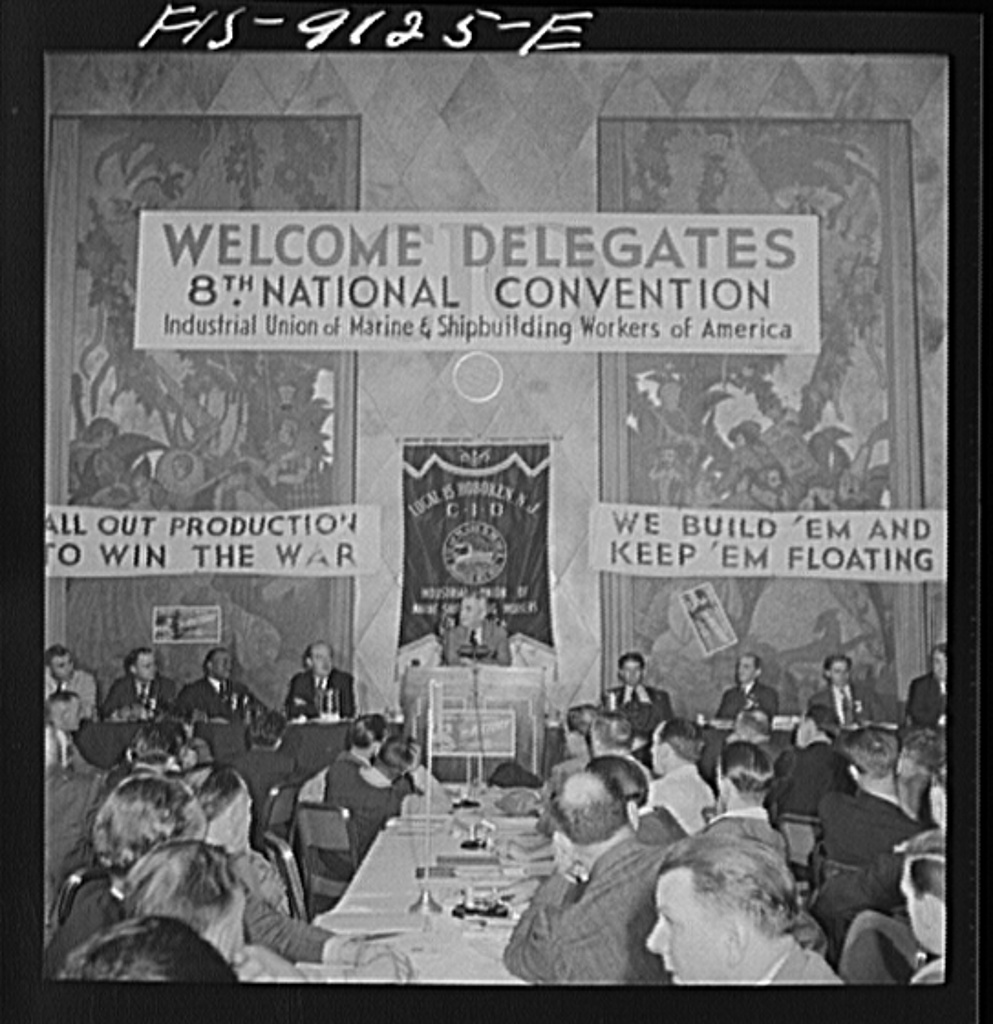
Walter Nash, New Zealand's minister to the United States, addresses IUMSWA delegates at the organization's 1942 national convention in New York City

The Industrial Union of Marine and Shipbuilding Workers of America (IUMSWA) was an American labor union which existed between 1933 and 1988. The IUMSWA was first organised at the New York Shipbuilding Corporation shipyard in Camden, New Jersey after striking in 1934 and 1935. From here it slowly spread to a number of other private shipyards in the Northeast, gaining representation at the Staten Island shipyard in 1936, the Federal Shipyard in 1937, Brooklyn and Hoboken in 1939, Baltimore and Sparrows Point in 1941, as well as a range of other smaller ship repair yards in the New York area. The IUMSWA's industrial coverage of all production workers in the shipbuilding industry brought it into conflict with established craft unions, such as the boilermakers, leading the IUMSWA to be refused an AFL charter in 1933. The IUMSWA later joined the Congress of Industrial Organizations in 1936.

In 1940, the membership was about 100,000. IUMSWA gained size and strength during the World War II shipbuilding effort, and membership reached about 250,000. IUMSWA Local 15 signed a contract on May 15, 1941 covering workers at Bethlehem Steel Corporation's shipyard in Hoboken, New Jersey. This ended the company's policy of an open shop in shipbuilding, and was an important step towards the Steel Workers Organizing Committee (SWOC-CIO)'s success in the organizing the workers in Bethlehem's steel manufacturing plants.

The IUMSWA generally had a weak track record on the issues of racism and the rights of Black workers, often acquiescing to the racism of white workers, particularly in the South. Anti-racist initiatives within the IUMSWA came from local activists and not from national officers. The most successful example of anti-racist activism within the union was due to left-wing trade unionists organizing to integrate the Federal Shipbuilding and Drydock Company. Black and Jewish activists including Bob Monroe, Lou Kaplan and Al Elliott, as well as members of the Philadelphia Black community, were instrumental in the push to desegregate the shipyards at the Sun Shipbuilding & Drydock Co. Anti-racist efforts were much less successful in Mobile, Alabama. IUMSWA organizers at the Alabama Drydock and Shipbuilding Company bowed to pressures from Southern segregationists in order to cater to white workers. Black workers and women workers were included at Bethlehem Steel's Fore River Shipyard and Sparrows Point locations, but they were generally consigned to auxiliary yards that only lasted for the duration of World War II.

The membership of the union declined after the war ended.

In the 1970s and 1980s, the union was known for its efforts in worker health and safety.

IUMSWA was merged with the International Association of Machinists in 1988.

== Presidents ==
1934: John Green
1951: John J. Grogan
1968: Andrew Pettis
1973: Eugene L. McCabe
1975: Frank Derwin
1980s: Arthur Batson
