= John Green (unionist) =

Scottish-born American labor unionist

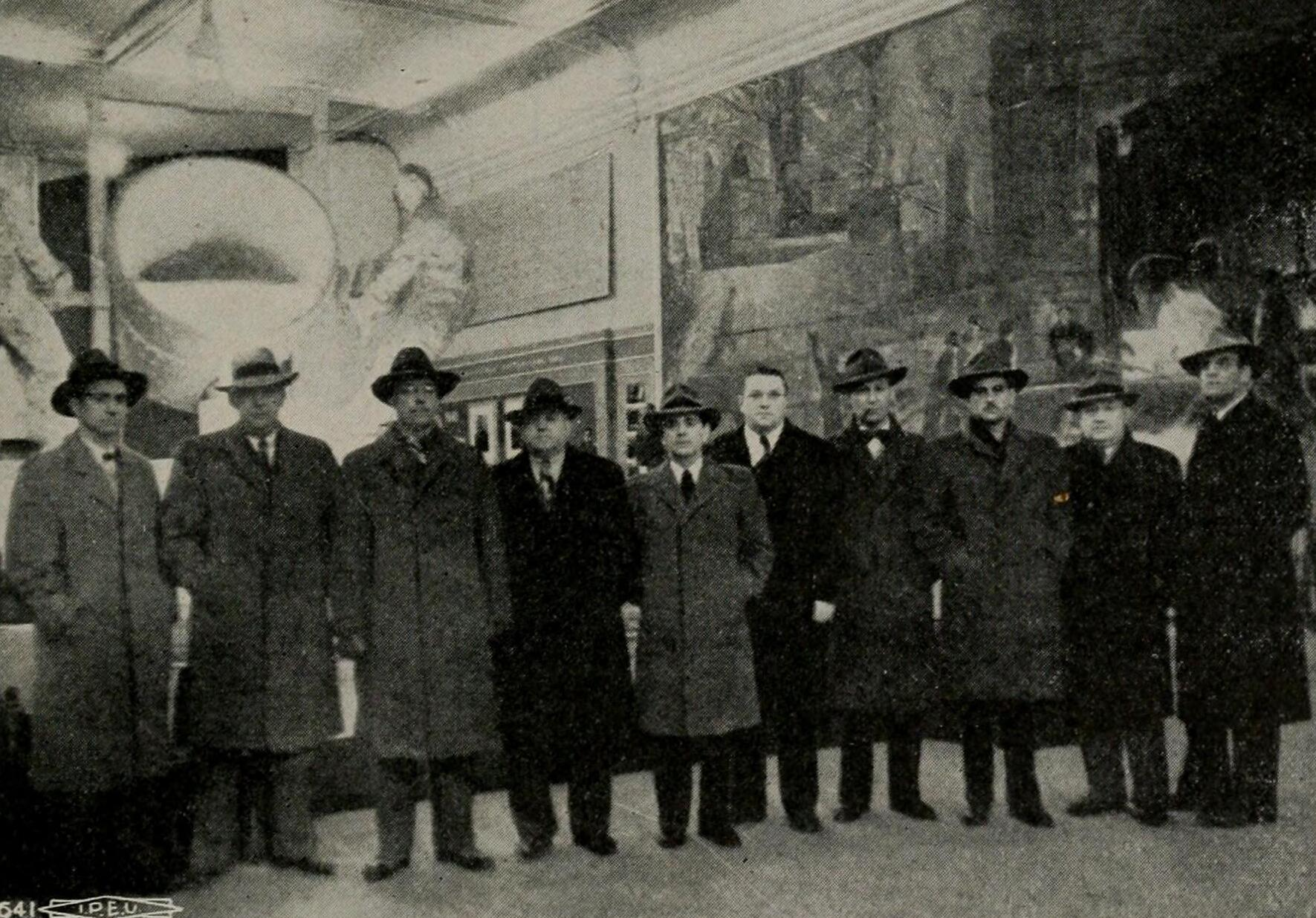
Green (fifth from left) and other members of a CIO delegation to the Soviet Union, 1945

John Green (November 15, 1896 – February 20, 1957) was a Scottish-born American labor union leader.

Born in Clydebank in Scotland, Green emigrated to the United States in 1923. He settled in Camden, New Jersey, and became a sheet metalworker at the New York Shipbuilding Corporation. In 1933, he organized the first union local at the yard. This rapidly grew, and in 1935, it became the Industrial Union of Marine and Shipbuilding Workers of America, with Green elected as its founding president.

Green affiliated the new union with the Congress of Industrial Organizations (CIO), and he became a vice-president of the federation. From 1940, he served on the National Defense Advisory Commission, and from 1942 on the management and labor committee of the War Manpower Commission. In 1948, he was awarded the President's Certificate of Merit for his service.

In 1945, Green represented the CIO at the founding conference of the World Federation of Trade Unions, in London. He left the Marine and Shipbuilding Workers in 1951, to become chairman of the new United Railroad Workers of America.

Trade union offices
Preceded by Union founded	President of the Industrial Union of Marine and Shipbuilding Workers of America; 1934–1951	Succeeded by John J. Grogan
