= John West (footballer) =

Irish footballer

Personal information
- Full name: John Francis West
- Date of birth: 1888
- Place of birth: Ulverston, Lancashire, England
- Position: Forward

Senior career*
Years	Team	Apps	(Gls)
1909–1922	Bohemians		
- * Club domestic league appearances and goals

John West was an Irish soccer player who played for Bohemians during the 1910s.

== Career ==
Born in 1888 in Ulverston to an Irish father and an English mother, the West family relocated to Dublin where John Snr. worked for the Ordnance Survey Ireland, in due course his son John joined him there while also beginning his football career.

He was top scorer for Bohs during the 1912/13 season. His goalscoring record for that season showed a total of 23 goals from 31 games in all competitions. This places him in the top 20 goalscoring seasons of all time for Bohemians. This was all achieved without payment as Bohs were strictly amateur during these times.

He later had spells at Belfast United and Cardiff City and was coach at Drumcondra during the 1930s.

John had a lifelong love of music and would often sing and perform at social functions related to Bohemians. In the early 1920s he began singing professionally and enjoyed some success, appearing on stage frequently in Dublin and also touring Britain and Italy.
