= Jack Lyons (footballer, born 1919) =

Australian rules footballer (1919–1955)

Personal information
- Full name: John Gerard Lyons
- Born: 5 December 1919; Essendon, Victoria
- Died: 21 March 1955 (aged 35); Craigieburn, Victoria
- Original team: Essendon CYMS (CYMSFA)
- Height: 179 cm (5 ft 10 in)
- Weight: 76 kg (168 lb)
- Position: Defender

Playing career^{1}
Years	Club	Games (Goals)
1945–46	Essendon	32 (3)
1947–48	North Melbourne	24 (0)
Total		56 (3)
- ^{1} Playing statistics correct to the end of 1948.

John Gerard Lyons (5 December 1919 – 21 March 1955) was an Australian rules footballer who played with Essendon and North Melbourne in the Victorian Football League (VFL) during the 1940s.

Recruited locally from CYMS Football Association (CYMSFA) club Essendon CYMS, Lyons played 17 of a possible 20 games in 1945, his debut season. A hard running back pocket, he polled well in Essendon's "Best and Fairest" count that season to finish runner-up to Wally Buttsworth. Despite being a regular member of the team for most of the 1946 VFL season, Lyons wasn't selected in the finals series and crossed over to North Melbourne at the end of the year.

Lyons missed just two games in his first year with North Melbourne and polled nine votes in the Brownlow Medal count, finishing as his club's second best vote getter.

Lyons was killed in a traffic collision on 21 March 1955, at the age of 35.
