= Johnny West =

Johnny West may refer to:

- Johnny West (action figure), action figure created by Louis Marx and Company
- Johnny West il mancino, 1965 Italian film directed by Gianfranco Parolini
- Jonnie West, basketball executive and son of Jerry West, basketball player and executive
- Jonny West, singer/songwriter and finalist on eighteenth season of American Idol

== See also ==
- John West (disambiguation)
