= Stuart Appelbaum =

American trade union leader (born 1953)

Stuart Harris Appelbaum (born 1953) is an American trade union leader. Appelbaum has been the president of the Retail, Wholesale and Department Store Union (RWDSU) since May 1, 1998. He is also president of the Jewish Labor Committee. In February 2022, he was elected board of directors of the National Endowment for Democracy, a U.S. government-funded non-profit.

== Early life and education ==
Appelbaum spent his childhood in Hartford, Connecticut. As a youth, he was raised in a Conservative synagogue and was president of his United Synagogue Youth chapter. He attended Camp Ramah. He graduated summa cum laude from Brandeis University and received a Juris Doctor degree from Harvard Law School. On September 1, 2019, he married MUFG Bank business analyst Michihito Osawa in Battery Park, New York City. New Jersey Governor Phil Murphy took part in the ceremony.

Trade union offices
Preceded by Lenore Miller	President of the Retail, Wholesale and Department Store Union; 1998–present	Succeeded by Incumbent
Preceded by Morton Bahr	President of the Jewish Labor Committee; 2001–present	Succeeded by Incumbent
