= Royal Yacht Club (disambiguation) =

Royal Yacht Club is a former name of the Royal Yacht Squadron on the Isle of Wight.

Royal Yacht Club may also refer to:

In Australia:

- Royal Brighton Yacht Club
- Royal Freshwater Bay Yacht Club
- Royal Geelong Yacht Club
- Royal Perth Yacht Club
- Royal Prince Alfred Yacht Club
- Royal Yacht Club of Tasmania
- Royal Yacht Club of Victoria

In Canada:

- Royal Canadian Yacht Club
- Royal Hamilton Yacht Club
- Royal Kennebeccasis Yacht Club
- Royal Lake of the Woods Yacht Club
- Royal Newfoundland Yacht Club
- Royal Nova Scotia Yacht Squadron
- Royal St. Lawrence Yacht Club
- Royal Vancouver Yacht Club
- Royal Victoria Yacht Club

In England:

- Royal Burnham Yacht Club
- Royal Corinthian Yacht Club
- Royal Cornwall Yacht Club
- Royal County of Berkshire Yacht Club
- Royal Cruising Club
- Royal Dart Yacht Club
- Royal Dorset Yacht Club
- Royal Fowey Yacht Club
- Royal Harwich Yacht Club
- Royal London Yacht Club
- Royal Mersey Yacht Club
- Royal Norfolk and Suffolk Yacht Club
- Royal Northumberland Yacht Club
- Royal Portsmouth Corinthian Yacht Club
- Royal Southampton Yacht Club
- Royal Southern Yacht Club
- Royal Temple Yacht Club
- Royal Thames Yacht Club
- Royal Torbay Yacht Club
- The Royal Victoria Yacht Club
- Royal Western Yacht Club of England
- Royal Windermere Yacht Club
- Royal Yorkshire Yacht Club

In British Overseas Territories, Crown Dependencies:

- Royal Bermuda Yacht Club
- Royal British Virgin Islands Yacht Club
- Royal Channel Islands Yacht Club
- Royal Gibraltar Yacht Club
- Royal Hamilton Amateur Dinghy Club

In India:

- Royal Bombay Yacht Club
- Royal Madras Yacht Club

In the Republic of Ireland:

- Royal Cork Yacht Club
- Royal Irish Yacht Club
- Royal Munster Yacht Club (now merged with the Royal Cork Yacht Club)
- Royal St. George Yacht Club
- Royal Western Yacht Club of Ireland

In Northern Ireland:

- Royal North of Ireland Yacht Club
- Royal Ulster Yacht Club

In New Zealand:

- Royal New Zealand Yacht Squadron

In Scotland:

- Royal Findhorn Yacht Club
- Royal Forth Yacht Club
- Royal Highland Yacht Club
- Royal Largs Yacht Club
- Royal Northern and Clyde Yacht Club (an amalgam of the Royal Northern Yacht Club and the Royal Clyde Yacht Club)
- Royal Tay Yacht Club

In South Africa:

- Royal Cape Yacht Club
- Royal Natal Yacht Club

In Sweden:

- Royal Gothenburg Yacht Club
- Royal Swedish Yacht Club

In United Kingdom

- Royal Ocean Racing Club
- Royal Engineers Yacht Club
- Royal Naval Sailing Association
- Royal Naval Volunteer Reserve Yacht Club

In Wales:

- Royal Anglesey Yacht Club
- Royal Dee Yacht Club
- Royal Welsh Yacht Club

In other countries or territories:

- Barbados Yacht Club (formerly the Royal Barbados Yacht Club)
- Royal Danish Yacht Club
- Royal Hong Kong Yacht Club
- Royal Jamaica Yacht Club
- Royal Maas Yacht Club
- Royal Malta Yacht Club
- Royal Norwegian Yacht Club
- Royal Suva Yacht Club
- Royal Tarragona Yacht Club
- Royal Varuna Yacht Club

== See also ==
- Royal Barcelona Maritime Club
- Koninklijke Nederlandsche Zeil en Roei Vereeniging
- Royal Ocean Racing Club
- Royal Yacht Squadron (disambiguation)
- Royal Yachting Association
