= List of Canadian organizations with royal prefix =

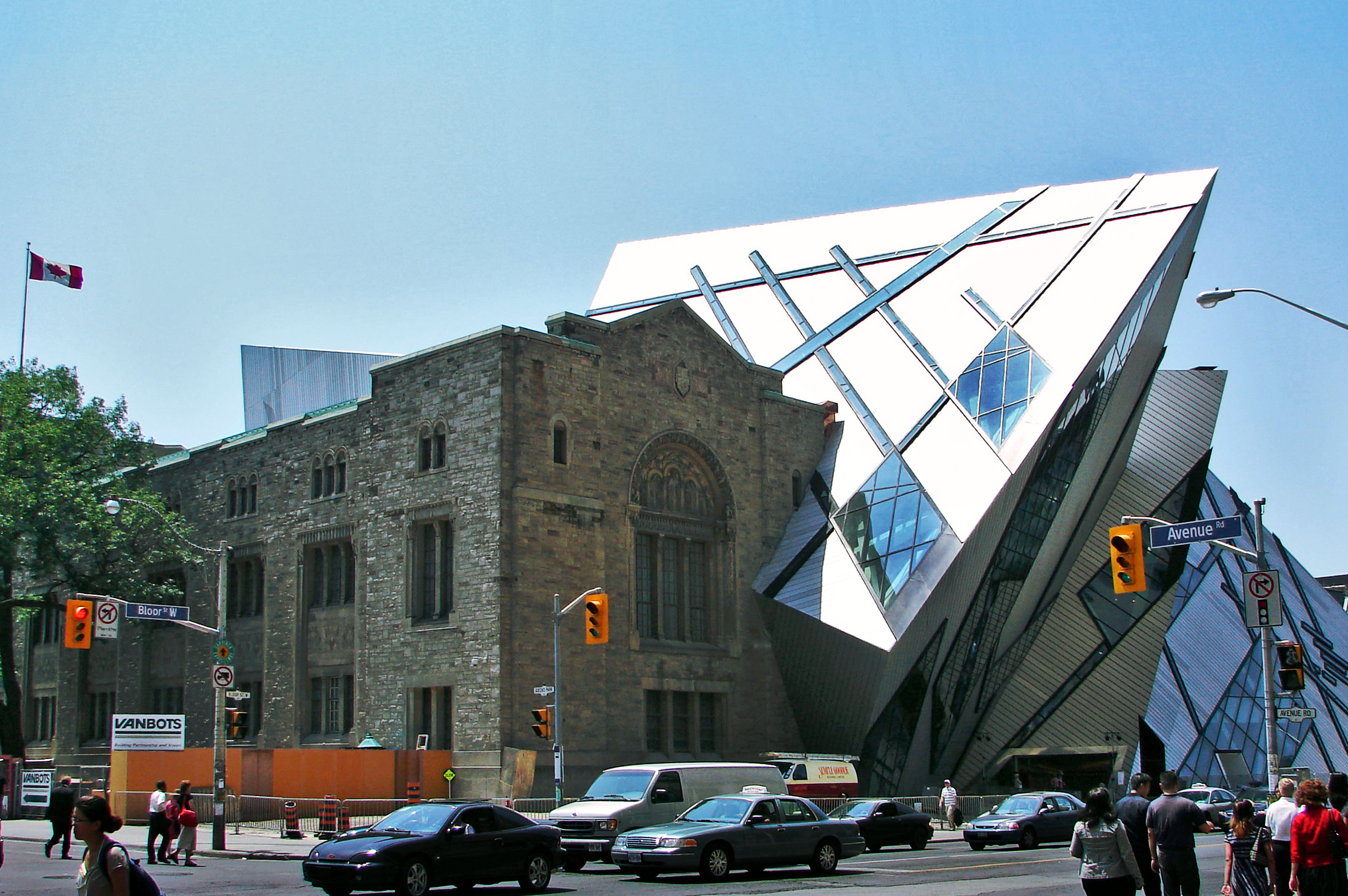
The Royal Ontario Museum in Toronto, given its royal prefix by Order in Council of the Crown in Right of Ontario in 1912. It is under the patronage of the Lieutenant Governor of Ontario.

This is a list of Canadian organizations with designated royal status, listed by the king or queen who granted the designation.

As a matter of honour, the Canadian monarch may bestow on an organization the right to use the prefix royal before its name; this may be done for any type of constituted group, from the Royal Ottawa Golf Club to the Royal Canadian Regiment. The granting of this distinction falls within the royal prerogative and is conferred through the office of the King's viceroy, the governor general of Canada, with input from the Department of Canadian Heritage on whether or not the institution meets the criteria of having been in existence for at least 25 years, being financially secure, and a non-profit organization, among others.

== Civilian ==
Royal prefix granted by King George III
Year	Organization
1801	Royal Institution for the Advancement of Learning (later McGill University)

Royal prefix granted by Queen Victoria
Year	Organization
1837	Royal Nova Scotia Yacht Squadron
1851	Royal Canadian Institute
1854	Royal Canadian Yacht Club
1862	Royal Halifax Yacht Club (superseded by the Royal Nova Scotia Yacht Squadron)
1878	Royal Military College
1880	Royal Canadian Academy of Arts
1882	Royal Commonwealth Society of Canada
1883	Royal Society of Canada
1884	Royal Montreal Golf Club
1887	Royal Victoria Hospital
1888	Royal Victoria College
1891	Royal Hamilton Yacht Club (filed for bankruptcy in 1983; title reinstated in 1991)
1894	Royal Canadian Humane Association
1894	Royal St. Lawrence Yacht Club of Montreal
1894	Royal Toronto Sailing Skiff Club
1896	Royal Canadian Golf Association
1898	Royal Kennebeccasis Yacht Club

Royal prefix granted by King Edward VII
Year	Organization
1902	Royal Cape Breton Yacht Club (destroyed by fire in 2013)
1903	Royal Astronomical Society of Canada
1905	Royal Vancouver Yacht Club
1907	Royal Alexandra Hospital
1908	Royal Life Saving Society of Canada
1908	Royal Architectural Institute of Canada
1909	Royal Edward Laurentian Sanatorium (later Montreal Chest Hospital)

Royal prefix granted by King George V
Year	Organization
1910	Royal Guardians
1910	Royal Over-Seas League
1911	Royal Victoria Yacht Club
1912	Royal Ottawa Golf Club
1913	Royal Canadian Institute
1913	Royal Ottawa Sanatorium
1914	Royal Ontario Museum
1923	Royal Automobile Club of Canada (absorbed by the Canadian Automobile Association)
1924	Royal Lake of the Woods Yacht Club
1924	Royal Montreal Curling Club
1929	Royal College of Physicians and Surgeons of Canada
1930	Royal Botanical Gardens
1931	Royal Colwood Golf Club
1934	Royal Québec Golf Club

Royal prefix granted by King George VI
Year	Organization
1944	Royal Canadian Flying Clubs Association
1947	Royal Conservatory of Music

Royal prefix granted by Queen Elizabeth II
Year	Organization
1952	Royal Canadian Humane Association
1953	Royal Winnipeg Ballet
1953	Royal Commonwealth Society of Canada
1957	Royal Canadian Geographical Society
1959	Royal Canadian College of Organists
1959	Royal Philatelic Society of Canada
1959	Royal Glenora Club
1961	Royal Ottawa Mental Health Centre
1962	Royal Canadian Legion
1964	Royal Jubilee Hospital
1964	Royal College of Dentists
1965	Royal Newfoundland Yacht Club
1965	Royal Hamilton Conservatory of Music
1966	Royal Victoria Hospital
1969	Royal Western Nova Scotia Yacht Club
1970	Royal Manitoba Winter Fair
1972	Royal United Services Institute of Vancouver Island
1975	Royal United Services Institute of Alberta
1977	Royal United Services Institute of Kingston, Ontario
1979	Royal United Services Institute of Regina, Saskatchewan
1981	Royal Manitoba Yacht Club
1982	Royal United Services Institute of Manitoba (later Royal Military Institute of Manitoba)
1983	Royal New Brunswick Rifle Association
1984	Royal Glenora Club
1987	Royal British Columbia Museum
1989	Royal United Services Institute of Vancouver
1989	Royal St. George's College
1990	Royal University Hospital
1990	Royal Tyrrell Museum of Palaeontology
1991	Royal Hamilton Yacht Club (first granted in 1891)
1993	Royal Saskatchewan Museum
1993	Royal Kingston Curling Club
1993	Royal United Services Institute of New Brunswick
1998	Royal Regina Golf Club
1999	Royal Niagara Military Institute
1999	Royal London United Services Institute
2000	Royal Canadian Pacific
2002	Royal Heraldry Society of Canada
2005	Royal Alberta Museum
2005	Royal Mayfair Golf Club
2007	Royal Canadian Numismatic Association
2010	Royal Manitoba Theatre Centre
2012	Royal Canadian Marine Search and Rescue
2013	The Royal Cape Breton Gaelic College
2014	Royal Aviation Museum of Western Canada

== Military ==
Royal prefix granted by Queen Victoria
Year	Organization
1874	Royal Military College of Canada
1877	8th Battalion "Royal Rifles" (later The Royal Rifles of Canada)
1887	Royal School of Cavalry (later Royal Canadian Dragoons)
1890	6th Regiment of Cavalry "Duke of Connaught's Royal Canadian Hussars" (now The Royal Canadian Hussars (Montreal))
1892	Royal Canadian Regiment of Infantry (later Royal Canadian Regiment)
1893	Royal Canadian Dragoons
1895	Royal Regiment of Canadian Artillery
1901	Royal Canadian Regiment

Royal prefix granted by King Edward VII
Year	Organization
1903	Royal Canadian Mounted Rifles (later Lord Strathcona's Horse (Royal Canadians))
1904	Royal Canadian Engineers
1905	Royal Canadian Horse Artillery

Royal prefix granted by King George V
Year	Organization
1910	Royal Naval College of Canada
1911	Royal Canadian Navy
1917	Royal Newfoundland Regiment
1919	Royal Canadian Ordnance Corps (redesignated The Royal Canadian Ordnance Corps in 1948, reverted to previous name in 1955)
1920	The Royal Montreal Regiment
1921	Royal 22nd Regiment
1921	Royal Canadian Corps of Signals (later Communications and Electronics Branch, Canadian Forces)
1924	Royal Canadian Air Force
1928	Royal 22^{e} Régiment
1932	Corps of Royal Canadian Engineers
1935	Royal Winnipeg Rifles
1935	Royal Highland Regiment of Canada
1936	Royal Regiment of Toronto Grenadiers (later Royal Regiment of Canada)
1936	Royal Hamilton Light Infantry

Royal prefix granted by King Edward VIII
Year	Organization
1936	Royal Canadian Army Medical Corps (later Royal Canadian Medical Service)

Royal prefix granted by King George VI
Year	Organization
1939	Royal Regiment of Canada
1941	Royal Roads Military College (closed 1995)
1942	Royal Canadian Army Cadets
1942	Royal Canadian Sea Cadets
1945	Royal Canadian Armoured Corps
1947	Royal Canadian Infantry Corps
1947	Royal Canadian Dental Corps
1948	Royal Canadian Military Institute

Royal prefix granted by Queen Elizabeth II
Year	Organization
1952	Royal Canadian Air Force Benevolent Fund
1952	Royal Canadian Naval Benevolent Fund
1952	Collège militaire royal de Saint-Jean
1953	Royal Canadian Air Cadets
1956	Royal New Brunswick Regiment
1966	The Royal Westminster Regiment
1964	Royal Canadian Naval Association
1982	Royal Regina Rifles
1998	Royal Highland Fusiliers of Canada
2018	Royal Canadian Logistics Service

Dates unknown
Year	Organization
	Royal Canadian Regiment Association

== Police ==
Royal prefix granted by King Edward VII
Year	Organization
1904	Royal North-West Mounted Police (later Royal Canadian Mounted Police)

Royal prefix granted by King George V
Year	Organization
1920	Royal Canadian Mounted Police

Royal prefix granted by Queen Elizabeth II
Year	Organization
1971	Royal Hamilton and District Officers' Institute
1979	Royal Newfoundland Constabulary

== Events ==
Royal prefix granted by Queen Victoria
Year	Organization
1880	Royal Canadian Henley Regatta

Royal prefix granted by King George V
Year	Organization
1922	Royal Agricultural Winter Fair of Toronto

Royal prefix granted by Queen Elizabeth II
Year	Organization
1970	Royal Manitoba Winter Fair
1984	Royal Canadian Henley Regatta
1993	Royal St. John's Regatta
2006	Royal Nova Scotia International Tattoo

== See also ==
- Monarchy of Canada
