= Bermuda Fitted Dinghy =

Type of sail boat

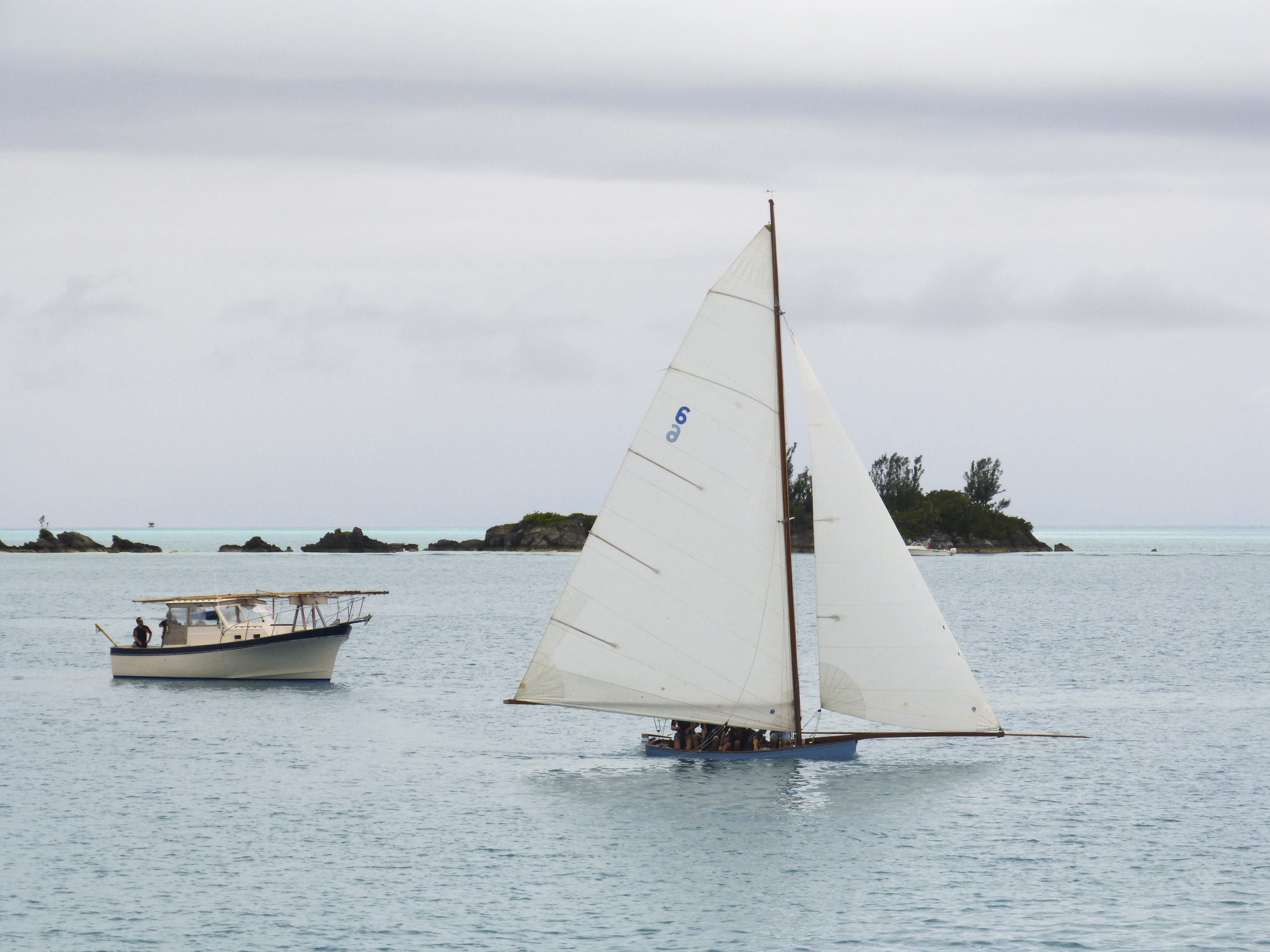
Bermuda Fitted Dinghy "Challenger II" at Mangrove Bay

The Bermuda Fitted Dinghy is a type of racing-dedicated sail boat used for competitions between the yacht clubs of Bermuda. Although the class has only existed for about 130 years, the boats are a continuance of a tradition of boat and ship design in Bermuda that stretches back to the earliest decades of the 17th century.

== Bermuda rig ==
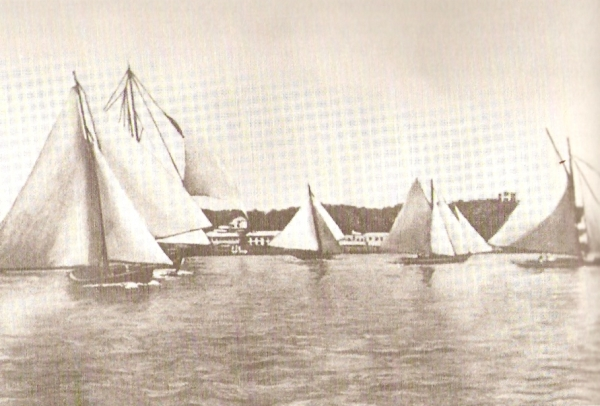
Bermudian work boats racing. They feature the Bermuda rig, also used on the larger Bermuda sloop ships. These workboats, effectively scaled-down models of the seagoing sloops, were themselves scaled-down to produce the Bermuda Fitted Dinghy.

The Bermuda rig, also known as a Marconi rig, refers to a configuration of mast and rigging with a triangular sail set aft of the mast with its headsail raised to the top of the mast. Its luff runs down the mast and is normally attached to the mast for its entire length. The sail's tack is attached at the base of the mast; its foot controlled by a boom; and its clew attached to the aft end of the boom, which is controlled by its sheet. In many early Bermudian vessels there were no booms, or only the outward corner of the mainsail might be attached to the boom, as is the case with Bermuda Fitted Dinghies. On traditional Bermudian designs, the mast was raked, and a long bowsprit was fitted, to which more than one jib might be fastened. This rig evolved on boats and small ships built in Bermuda throughout the 17th and 18th centuries, and had matured into its more or less modern form by the early 19th century. Although the rig became almost universally used on yachts and small boats during the 20th century, the traditional designs used in Bermuda were too demanding to sail for small or inexperienced crews, and there are few vessels outside of museums that have a traditional Bermudian rig – other than Bermuda Fitted Dinghies.

== History ==
The development of the rig is thought to have begun with fore-and-aft rigged boats built by a Dutch-born Bermudian in the 17th century. The Dutch were influenced by Moorish lateen rigs introduced during Spain's rule of the Netherlands. The Dutch eventually modified the design by omitting the masts, with the yard arms of the lateens being stepped in thwarts. By this process, the yards became raked masts. Lateen sails mounted this way were known as leg-of-mutton sails in English. The Dutch called a vessel rigged in this manner a bezaanjacht (nl). Captain John Smith reported that Captain Nathaniel Butler, governor of Bermuda from 1619 to 1622, employed the Dutch boat builder, who quickly established a leading position among Bermuda's boat makers obliging his competitors to emulate his designs. A poem published by John H. Hardie in 1671 described Bermuda's boats in the following way: "With tripple corner'd Sayls they always float, About the Islands, in the world there are, None in all points that may with them compare".

== Advent of sail racing in Bermuda ==
With the buildup of the Royal Naval Dockyard on Ireland Island, at the West End, and of the Army garrison, at first in the East End, at St. George's Garrison, though the military headquarters eventually moved to Prospect Camp at the centre of the colony, the idle navy and army officers, most ex-Public School boys, introduced a number of team sports to the colony. The best known of these were football, cricket, and rugby. At English schools and colleges many had also competed in rowing, and an attempt was made to introduce this sport to Bermuda, also. The rough, wind-driven Atlantic Ocean proved unsuitable, however, and the officers soon took to employing the local work boats for sail racing. These large sloops, with their crews, were hired for weekends, and sloop racing became very popular in Bermuda throughout the century. In time, sloops were designed and built specifically for racing, though they still relied on large, hired crews. The military officers were the driving force behind the creation of the Royal Bermuda Yacht Club (RBYC), in 1844, and, as with cricket, the sport developed an East End versus West End dynamic, resulting from the polar locations of the two headquarters.

== Introduction of dinghy racing ==
By 1880 there was great concern that the need for professional crews in sloop racing was making the sport too expensive, and that its development was stagnating, as a direct result. Dinghy racing was developed as a cheaper alternative. When the Bermuda Dinghy first appeared is uncertain, but the design is scaled down from the earlier sloops, rather than appearing to be an evolution of the dinghies and small boats previously used for more mundane purposes. The first race was held on 26 August 1880. A number of types of smaller boats were raced in different classes. The dinghies were restricted to amateur crews. In 1882, the Hamilton Amateur Dinghy Association was formed, holding its first races on 28 July. This association ultimately became the Royal Hamilton Amateur Dinghy Club. In 1883, Princess Louise, daughter of Queen Victoria, visited Bermuda, and she donated a trophy which was awarded to the winner of a dinghy race held on 8 March, which was restricted to boats both owned and steered by club members. A purse race was held after, which was open to all amateurs. Dinghies for this race were restricted to hulls of 12 feet (3.7 m) of keel, and 14 feet (4.3 m), 1 inch overall.

== Bermuda Fitted Dinghy ==
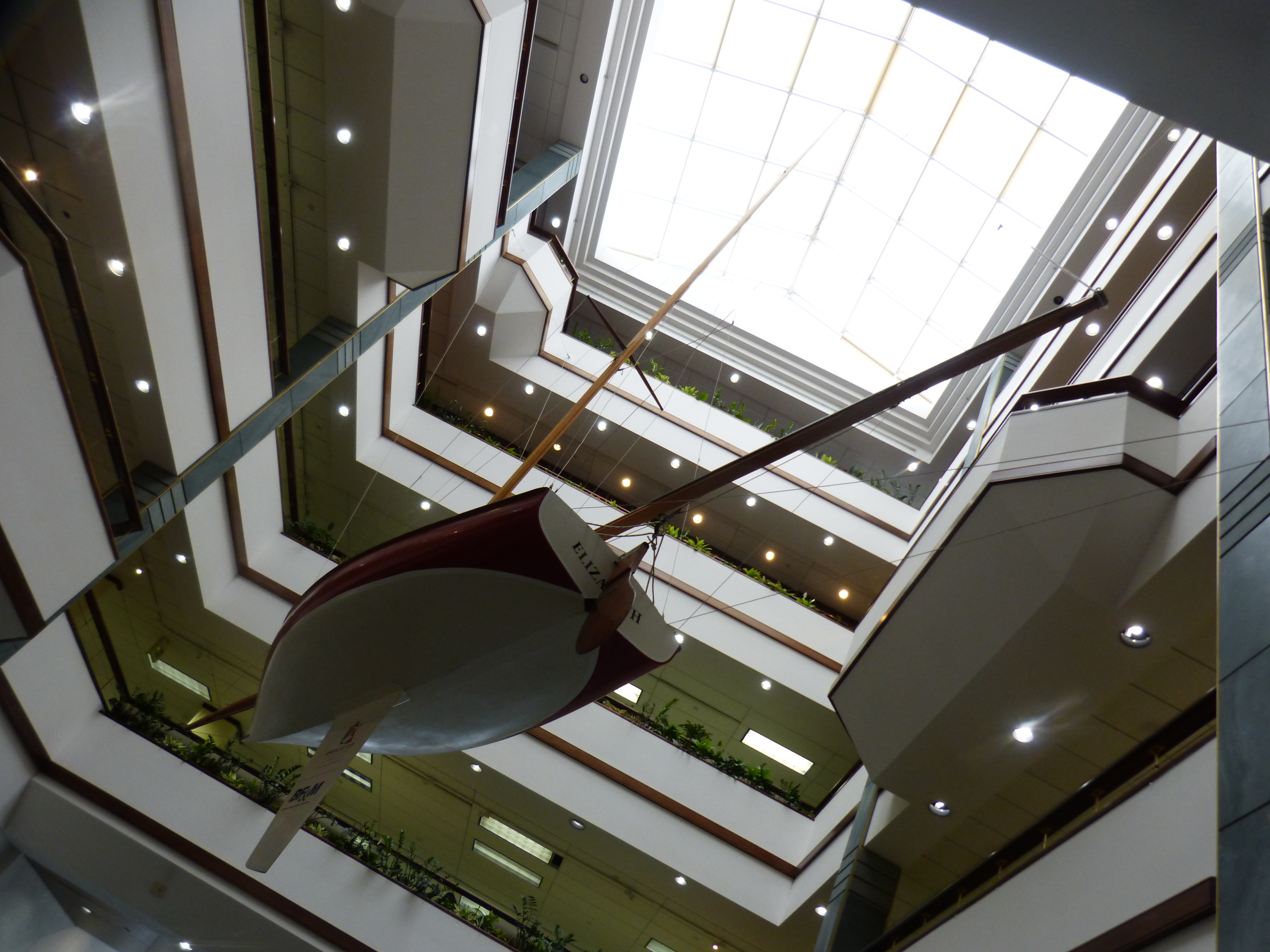
The retired Bermuda fitted dinghy "Elizabeth" on display in 2016

The dimensions of the boats from the 1883 race have remained the standard ever since. Despite the small hulls, the dinghies carried substantial rigging. Although square topsails were reportedly in use in the 1880s, the form used today soon developed, basically scaled down from the larger sloops. One early example, the Reckless, was fitted with a 28-foot (8.5 m) mast, 28-foot (8.5 m) boom, 14-foot (4.3 m) bowsprit, and 20-foot (6.1 m) spinnaker boom. She carried 70 square yards of canvas going upwind, while the spinnaker increased this to 92 square yards running downwind.

Original Bermuda Dinghies were roundbottomed and fitted with long, shallow keels so they would be easy to beach or could run over reefs without damage. During the first recorded race, held in St. George's Harbour in 1853, the existing boats were fitted with deep keel extensions fastened in place temporarily to give them the bite to sail better to windward. These metal keels (called fans) differentiated these racing boats from the "unfitted" working dinghies and gave the class its name.

== Racing ==
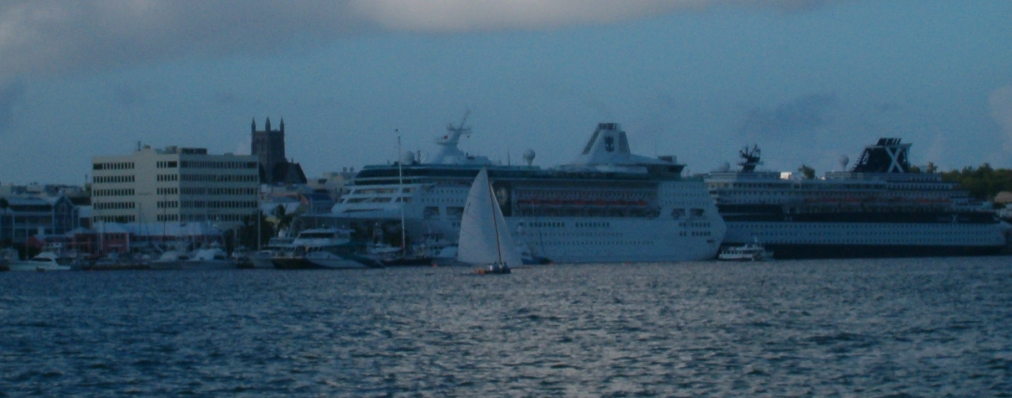
A Bermuda Fitted Dinghy, being put through its paces in Hamilton Harbour, Bermuda.

The dinghy racing, today, is an inter-club activity, fought between the Royal Bermuda Yacht Club (RBYC), the Royal Hamilton Amateur Dinghy Club (RHADC), the St. George's Dinghy and Sports Club and Sandys Boat Club. Whereas most of the professional crews of the earlier sloop racing, which has since died-out, were probably Black, the restriction of dinghy racing to these clubs, with their membership historically restricted to white people, means that Bermuda Fitted Dinghy racing has maintained an exclusive, all-white reputation in Bermuda. Although it is true that mounting a dinghy campaign requires significant financial and personnel resource, new entries are welcomed regardless of race, and many of Bermuda's best-known fitted sailors are black, including Stevie Dickinson and Glenn Astwood.

The racing is carried out on set dates in a variety of locations including Hamilton or St. George's Harbours, Granaway Deep, and Mangrove Bay. The dinghies sail windward leeward courses and the number of legs is decided based on the conditions at race time. Boats always finish to windward. The boats, despite their small sizes, are each normally crewed by six people, necessary to handle the large areas of sail, and also to continually bail the dinghies, which have very little freeboard, and which are often capsized by powerful gusts. A unique rule to racing states that the number of crew to finish a race can be less than the number that started. This can encourage boats to have crew dive off the transom during a race to push the boat forward, help lighten the boat and increase performance.

== Boats ==
As of 2011, 4 boats will be raced regularly during the Bermuda Fitted Dinghy season, although there have been rumours of other boats returning to the race course.

Contest III -Royal Bermuda Yacht Club

Challenger II -Sandy's Boat Club

Victory IV -St. George's Dinghy and Sports Club

Elizabeth II -Royal Hamilton Amateur Dinghy Club

Boats Rumoured to Return in the Near Future

Bloodhound - Bermuda Maritime Museum

Port Royal II -Knight White Dinghy Association

Echo -Sandy's Dinghy Association

== Coronation Cup ==
This trophy is awarded to the overall winner of every season. The results from the last 20 seasons are...

2022- Contest III

2021- Contest III

2020- Contest III & Elisabeth II

2019- Contest III

2018- Elisabeth II

2017- Elisabeth II

2016- Elisabeth II

2015- Contest III

2014- Contest III

2013- Contest III

2012- Contest III

2011- Contest III

2010- Challenger II

2009- Challenger II

2008- Contest III

2007- Contest III

2006- Contest III

2005- Challenger II

2004- Contest III

2003- Contest III

2002- Contest III
