= Spirit of Bermuda =

Bermuda-rigged sloop and training ship

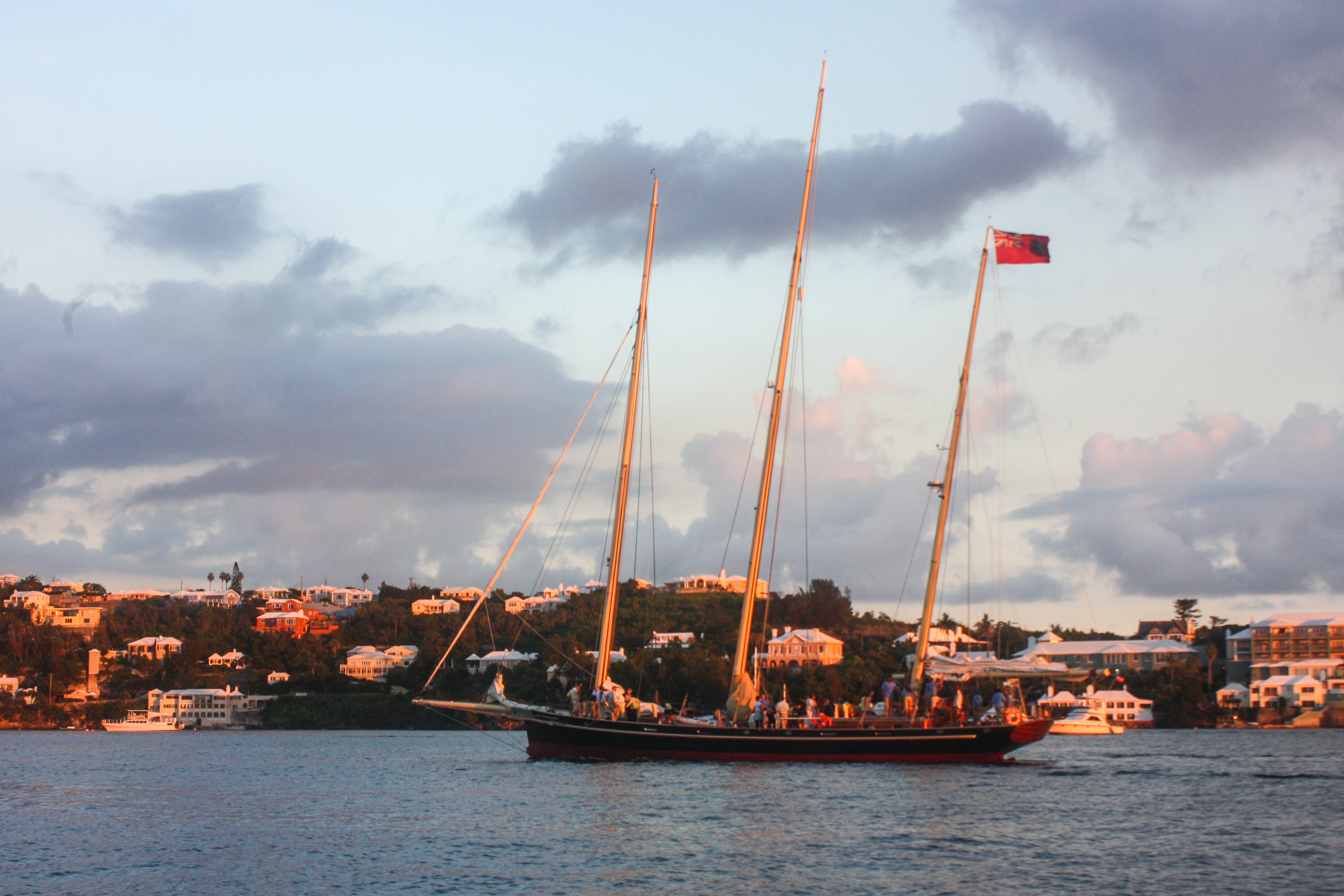
- The modern Spirit of Bermuda in Hamilton Harbour

History

Bermuda (UK)
- Name: Spirit of Bermuda
- Owner: Bermuda Sloop Foundation (BSF)
- Port of registry: (Bermuda) Hamilton
- Builder: Rockport Marine, in Rockport Maine
- Launched: August 2006
- Identification: MMSI number: 310518000; Callsign: ZCDS7

General characteristics
- Class & type: Sail training vessel
- Tonnage: 88 GT
- Length: 112 ft 0 in (34.1 m) oa; 86 ft 0 in (26.2 m) waterline
- Beam: 23 ft 0 in (7.0 m)
- Draught: 9 ft 6 in (2.9 m)
- Installed power: Gas engine
- Propulsion: 385 hp (287 kW)
- Sail plan: Bermuda-rigged Bermuda sloop/Ballyhoo schooner

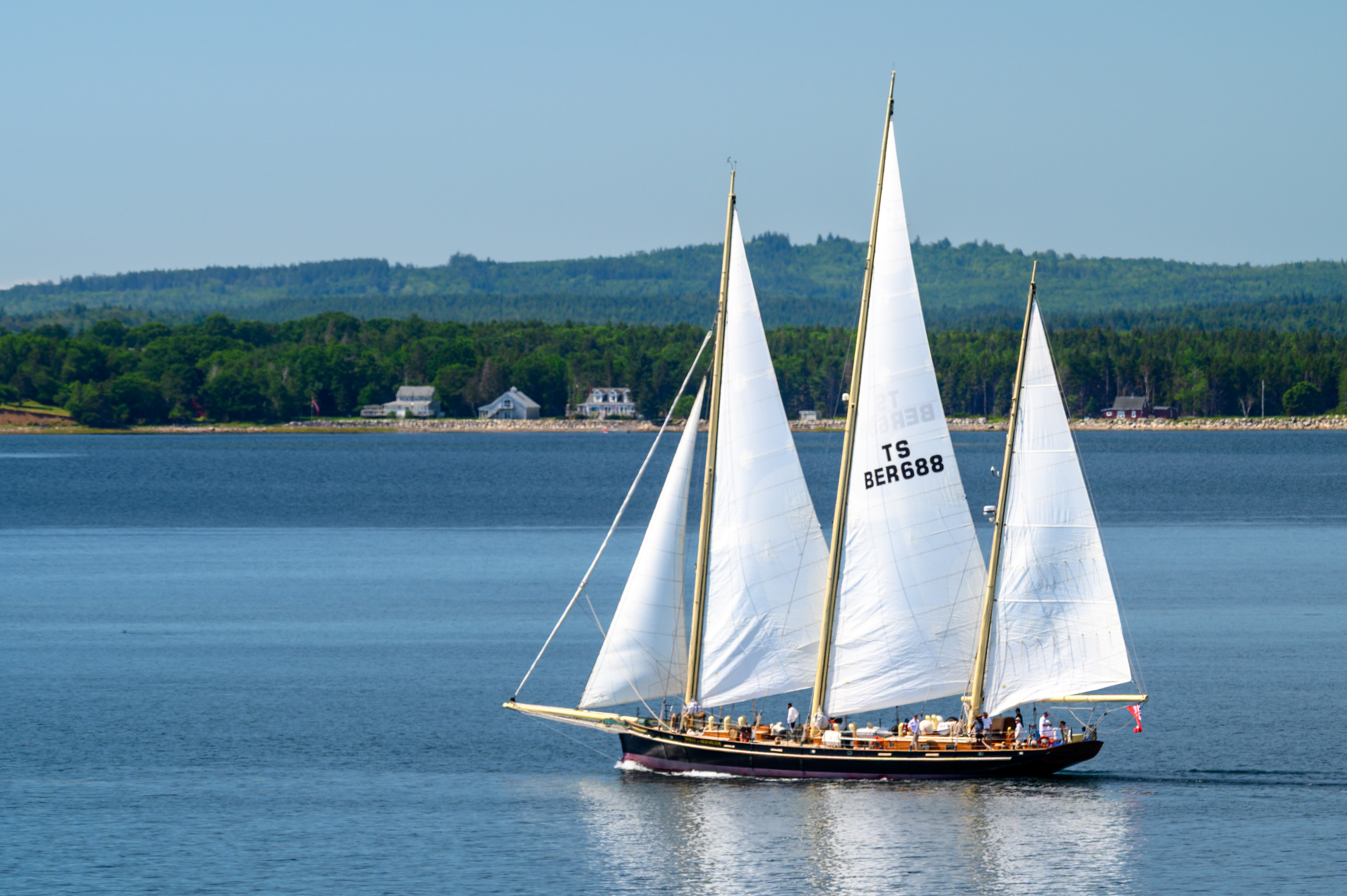
Bermuda-rigged training sloop, Spirit of Bermuda, leaving Lunenburg, Nova Scotia, Canada.

Spirit of Bermuda is a modern-built Bermuda sloop. She is a replica of a Royal Navy sloop-of-war, depicted in a well-known 1831 painting.

== History of the Bermuda sloop ==
The Bermuda sloop was a type of small sailing ship built in Bermuda between the seventeenth and nineteenth centuries. Fitted with a gaff rig, a combination of gaff and square rig, or Bermuda rig, they were used by Bermudian merchants, privateers and other seafarers. Their versatility, and their manoeuvrability and speed, especially upwind, meant they were also jealously sought after by non-Bermudian operators for both merchant and naval roles. Bermudians built large numbers of them for their own merchant fleet and for export before being obliged to turn to other trades in the nineteenth century. At the end of the twentieth century, only one Bermuda sloop remained in the world, a privately owned sloop of 3 tonnes and 25 feet long called Shamrock, and most Bermudians had no practical or romantic connection to the island's long history as a maritime economy. These were among the facts that prompted the construction of a new Bermuda sloop, the Spirit of Bermuda, and the creation of a sail training organisation, the Bermuda Sloop Foundation, to utilise her in instilling an awareness of the sea and of Bermuda's maritime heritage in her youth.

== Design and construction of Spirit of Bermuda ==
Unlike the original vessel, which would have been built almost entirely from Bermuda cedar, utilizing the plank-on-frame method of construction, Spirit of Bermuda is constructed with more readily-available woods such as Douglas fir and teak, utilizing the modern cold-molded method of wooden boat fabrication. She was built in the US for the charitable Bermuda Sloop Foundation (BSF) to serve as a sail training ship for Bermuda's youths.

Bermuda sloops were built with up to three masts. While the term sloop nowadays refers to vessels having only a single mast, the term was used differently in the past. In the Royal Navy, the term referred more to the small size of the vessel and to the rank of her commanding officer; a sloop-of-war was an unrated vessel and did not warrant a post captain in command. The single masted ships, with their huge sails, and the tremendous wind energy they harnessed, were demanding to sail, and required large, experienced crews. The Royal Navy favoured multi-masted versions as it was perennially short of sailors, at the end of the eighteenth century, and such crew members as it had, particularly in the Western Atlantic (given the continuing wars with France for control of Europe), received insufficient training. The longer decks of the multi-masted vessels also had the advantage of allowing more guns to be carried.

The Bermuda Sloop Foundation chose a three-masted design for one of the reasons the navy had: it was easier to handle and less dangerous for the inexperienced youths who would crew her. A design with Bermuda rig was also favoured, although the majority of Bermuda sloops historically built probably were fitted with a gaff rig.

The final design, naval architecture and engineering of the vessel was accomplished in Newport, Rhode Island by Langan Design Associates, headed at the time by company founder Bill Langan.

== The Bermuda Sloop Foundation ==
The Bermuda Sloop Foundation was founded in 1996 by Malcolm Kirkland, Alan Burland and Jay Kempe. During the next eight years, the foundation grew as donations were sought, and the design decided upon. Bermudian singer-songwriter Heather Nova recorded the single Together As One to raise funds for the project. Rockport Marine, in Rockport, Maine, was contracted to build the ship in 2004. Spirit of Bermuda was completed in August, 2006, and sailed to Bermuda that October. Since then she has operated locally and internationally on sail training cruises.

The name of Spirit of Bermuda commemorates that of a fifteen foot, Bermuda-rigged sloop, also equipped with oars, which was sailed by cousins Eric Johnson and Carl Holmes from Bermuda to New York City, departing on the 27 May and arriving on the 15, June, 1935. The duo received a farewell telephone call from Admiral the Honorable Sir Matthew Robert Best, Commander-in-Chief of the America and West Indies Station, and were seen off from the City of Hamilton by the Governor and Commander-in-Chief of Bermuda, Lieutenant-General Sir Thomas Astley-Cubitt, and large crowds on shore and afloat. They were greeted by a large crowd on their arrival at The Battery on Manhattan Island. The cousins had expected to complete their journey within a week, but had to fight their way through three storms over nineteen days. By their first night on the ocean, both were so seasick neither could steer and they lashed the tiller. On the 30 May the boat was capsized by a gust of wind while Johnson was up the mast. Both men were thrown overboard, but were able to reboard and right their vessel. After six days of reasonable weather, they ran into the worst of the storms on the 10th of June, which lasted for two nights and a day with the ocean washing over the deck. They jettisoned everything not required for survival while fighting these storms, but arrived in New York still with four days provisions and fifteen of the thirty-five gallons of fresh water they had left Bermuda with. They subsequently sailed Spirit of Bermuda to Toronto, Canada for display at the Canadian National Exhibition. Built by Johnson, their sloop was double-ended, with a beam of five feet, a draft of two feet, and 270 square feet of sail.

== Gallery ==
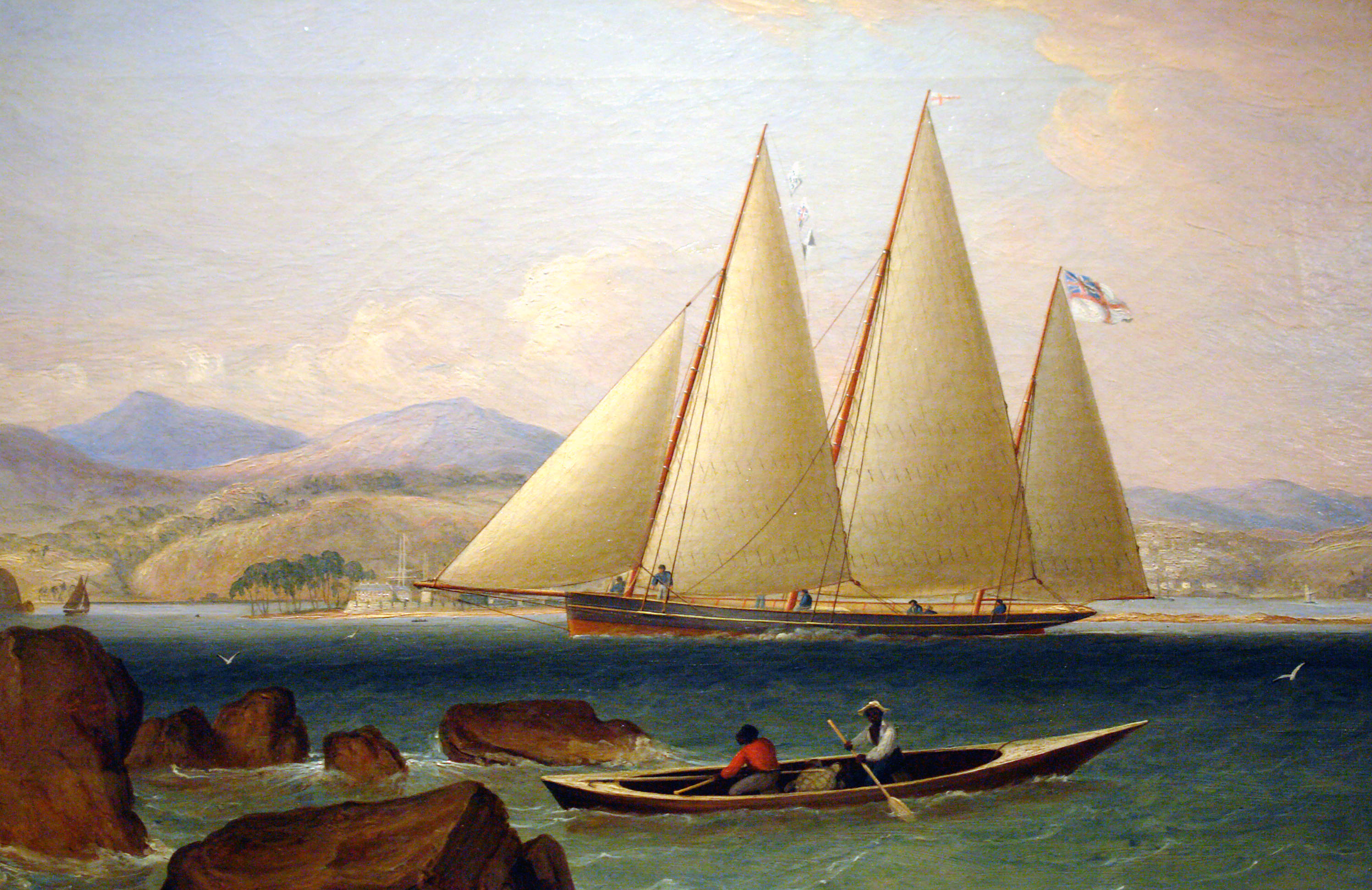
The 1831 painting, by John Lynn, of the Bermuda sloop of the Royal Navy upon which Spirit of Bermuda was modelled

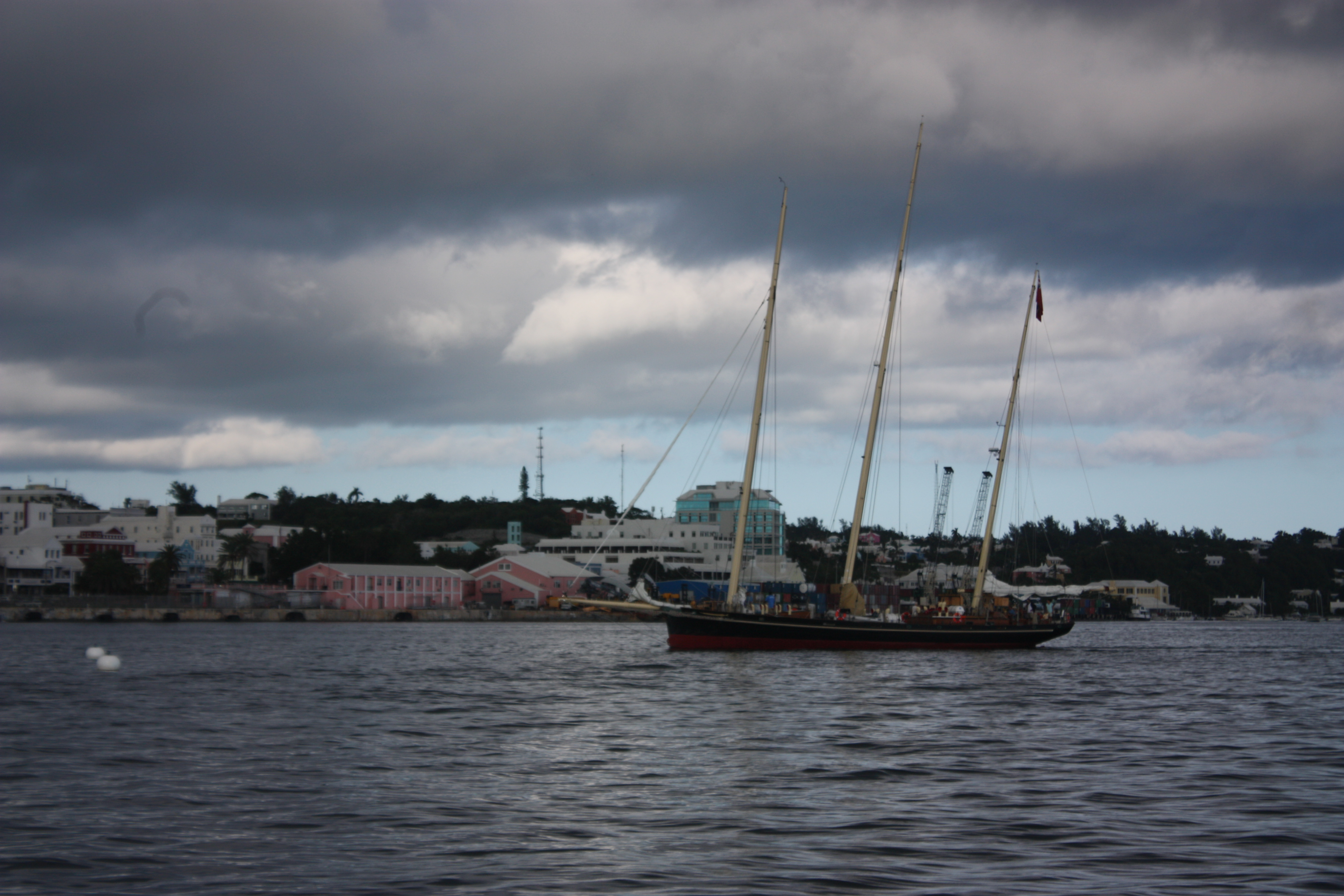
Spirit of Bermuda of the Bermuda Sloop Foundation

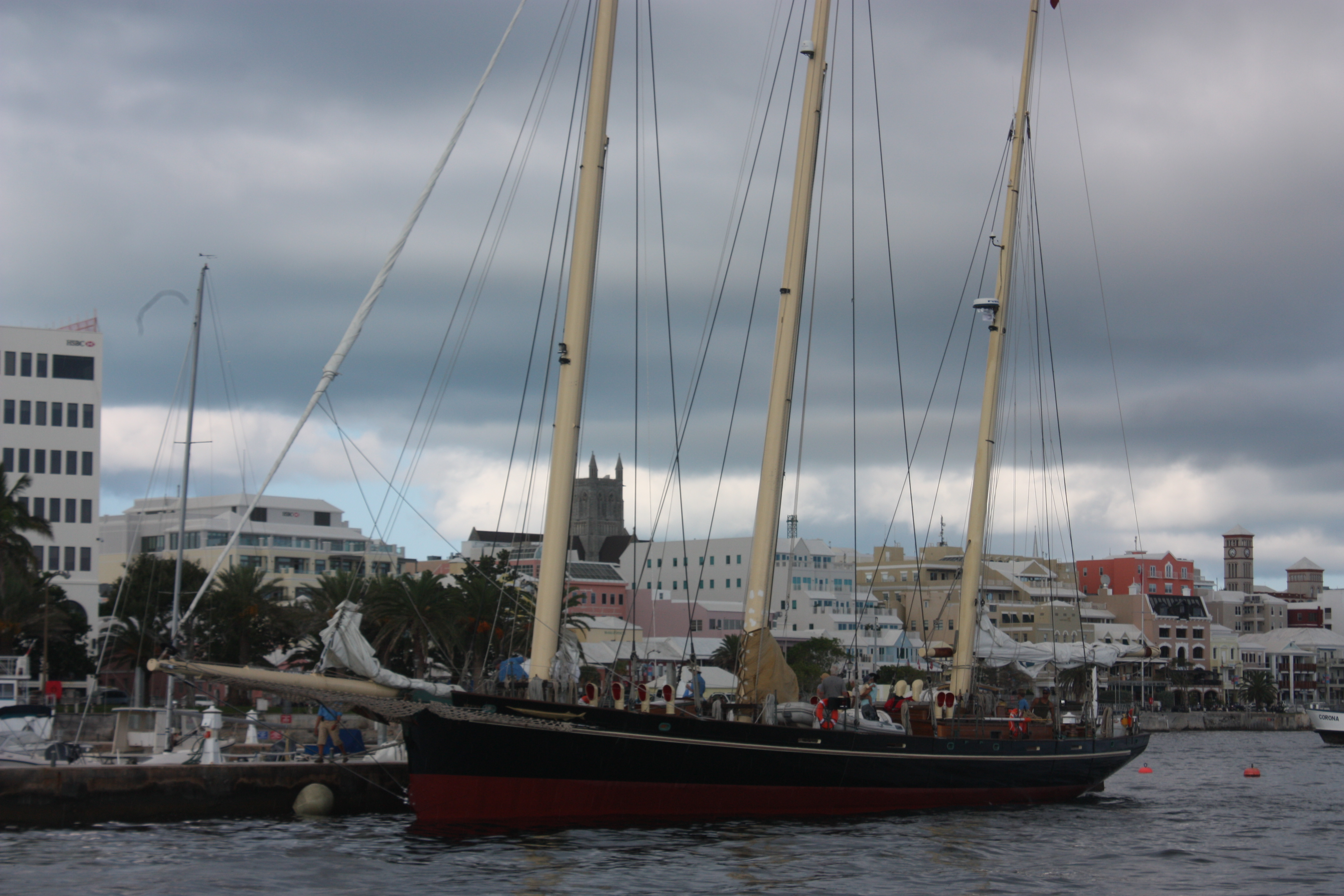
The Bermuda Sloop Spirit of Bermuda at the Royal Bermuda Yacht Club

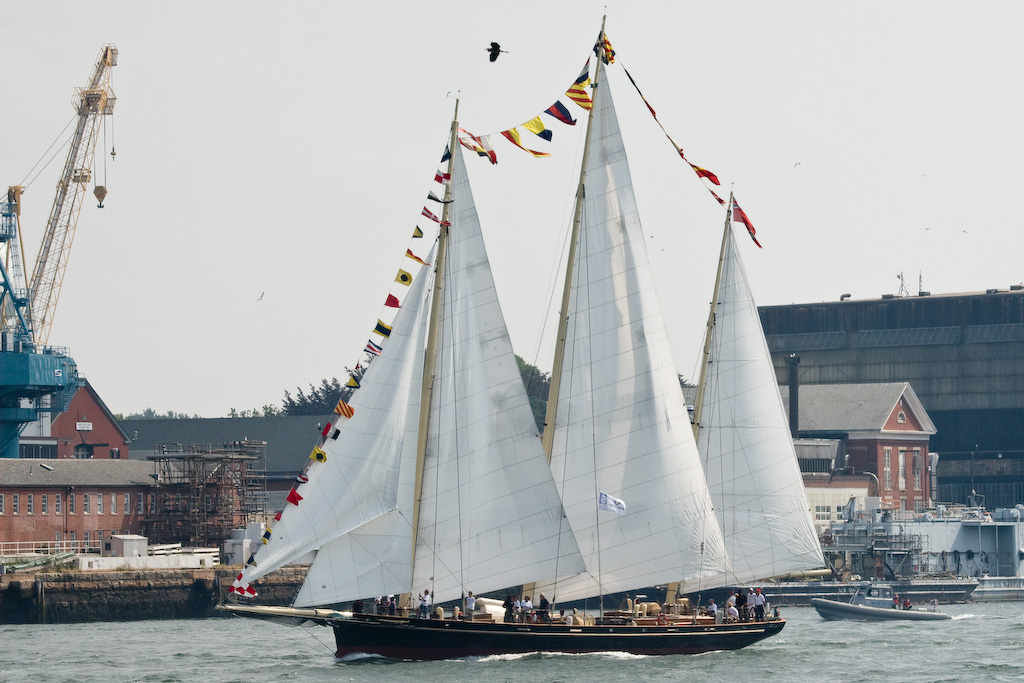
Spirit of Bermuda on a visit overseas.

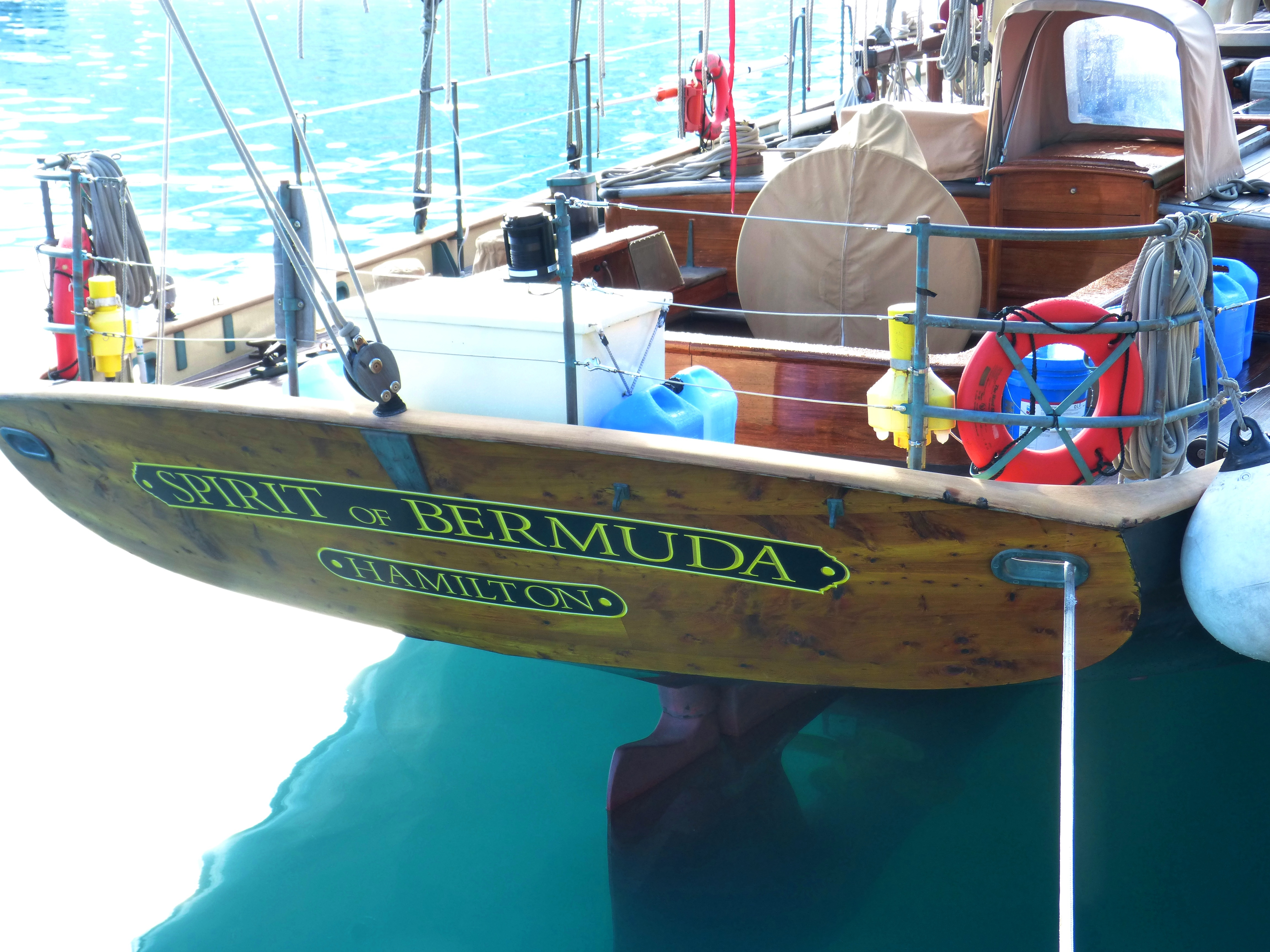
The Bermuda cedar transom of Spirit of Bermuda
