= Royal Hamilton Amateur Dinghy Club =

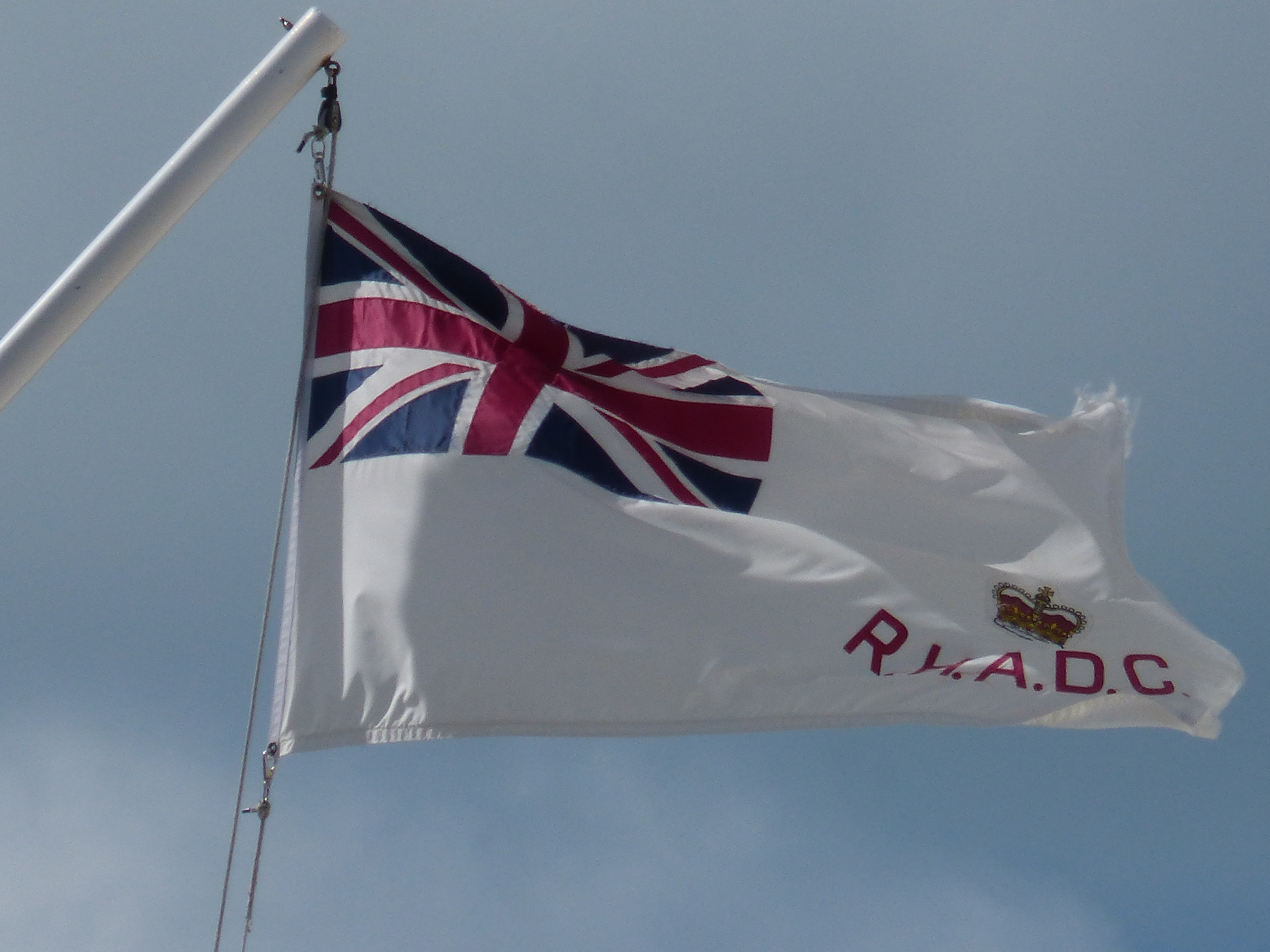
- White Ensign
- Short name: RHADC
- Founded: July 28, 1882; 144 years ago
- Location: Pembroke Parish, Bermuda
- Commodore: Roger Beach
- Website: www.rhadc.bm

The Royal Hamilton Amateur Dinghy Club (RHADC) is a private yacht club in the British Overseas Territory of Bermuda that was established as the Hamilton Amateur Dingey Association on, or before, 28 July 1882. It is the World's only Royal dinghy club.

== History ==
There was already a Royal yacht club in Bermuda, the Royal Bermuda Yacht Club founded in 1845 after the sport of racing yachts had become established in Bermuda primarily as a pastime of idle officers of the Bermuda Garrison and the Royal Naval Dockyard, Bermuda. Members of that club, however, focused primarily on racing sloops and schooners. The Hamilton Amateur Dingey Association was created to promote the racing of dinghies, which in Bermuda meant the Bermuda Fitted Dinghy, a scaled down version of the traditional sloops used locally as work boats and yachts. Sloops and dinghies were fitted with tall, raked masts and long bowsprits, fitted with the Bermuda rig.

The association held its first races on 28 July 1882, with eight boats in the first class race, which was won by HC Masters in the Reckless, and four in the second class race, which was won by EW Cooper in the Ariel.

In 1883, HRH Princess Louise, daughter of Queen Victoria, visited Bermuda, conferring the Royal title and donating a trophy that was awarded to the winner of a dinghy race held on 8 March, which was restricted to boats both owned and steered by club members. A purse race was held after, which was open to all amateurs. Dinghies for this race were restricted to hulls of 12 feet (3.7 m) of keel, and 14 feet (4.3 m), 1 inch overall. A defaced White Ensign was made for the club by Messrs. Lanff & Neeve, 97 Leadenhall Street, London. A change in the rules for Royal titles was made in 1890, restricting the authority to grant these to the reigning Monarch. As the title had been conferred on the club by the Queen's daughter, not the Queen, authorisation to use it ceased and it became the Hamilton Amateur Dingey Club 'til dropping the word Amateur in 1896. In 1953, Her Majesty Queen Elizabeth II confirmed the 1883 grant of the Royal title by Princess Louise and the club became the Royal Hamilton Amateur Dinghy Club.

== See also ==
- Royal Bermuda Yacht Club
- Sport in Bermuda
