= Royal Yacht Squadron (disambiguation) =

The Royal Yacht Squadron is a yacht club on the Isle of Wight in England.

Royal Yacht Squadron may also refer to:

- Royal Melbourne Yacht Squadron
- Royal New Zealand Yacht Squadron
- Royal Nova Scotia Yacht Squadron
- Royal Queensland Yacht Squadron
- Royal Sydney Yacht Squadron

== See also ==
- Royal Barcelona Maritime Club
- Royal Dutch Sailing & Rowing Club
- Royal Ocean Racing Club
- Royal Yacht Club (disambiguation)
- Royal Yachting Association
