= Bermuda sloop =

17th-century sailing vessel

The Bermuda sloop is a historical type of fore-and-aft rigged single-masted sailing vessel developed on the islands of Bermuda in the 17th century. Such vessels originally had gaff rigs with quadrilateral sails, but later evolved to use the Bermuda rig with triangular sails. Although the Bermuda sloop is often described as a development of the narrower-beamed Jamaica sloop, which dates from the 1670s, the high, raked masts and triangular sails of the Bermuda rig are rooted in a tradition of Bermudian boat design dating from the earliest decades of the 17th century. The historical Bermuda sloop is distinguished from other Bermuda rigged vessels, which may have multiple masts or may not have evolved in hull form from the traditional designs.

== History ==
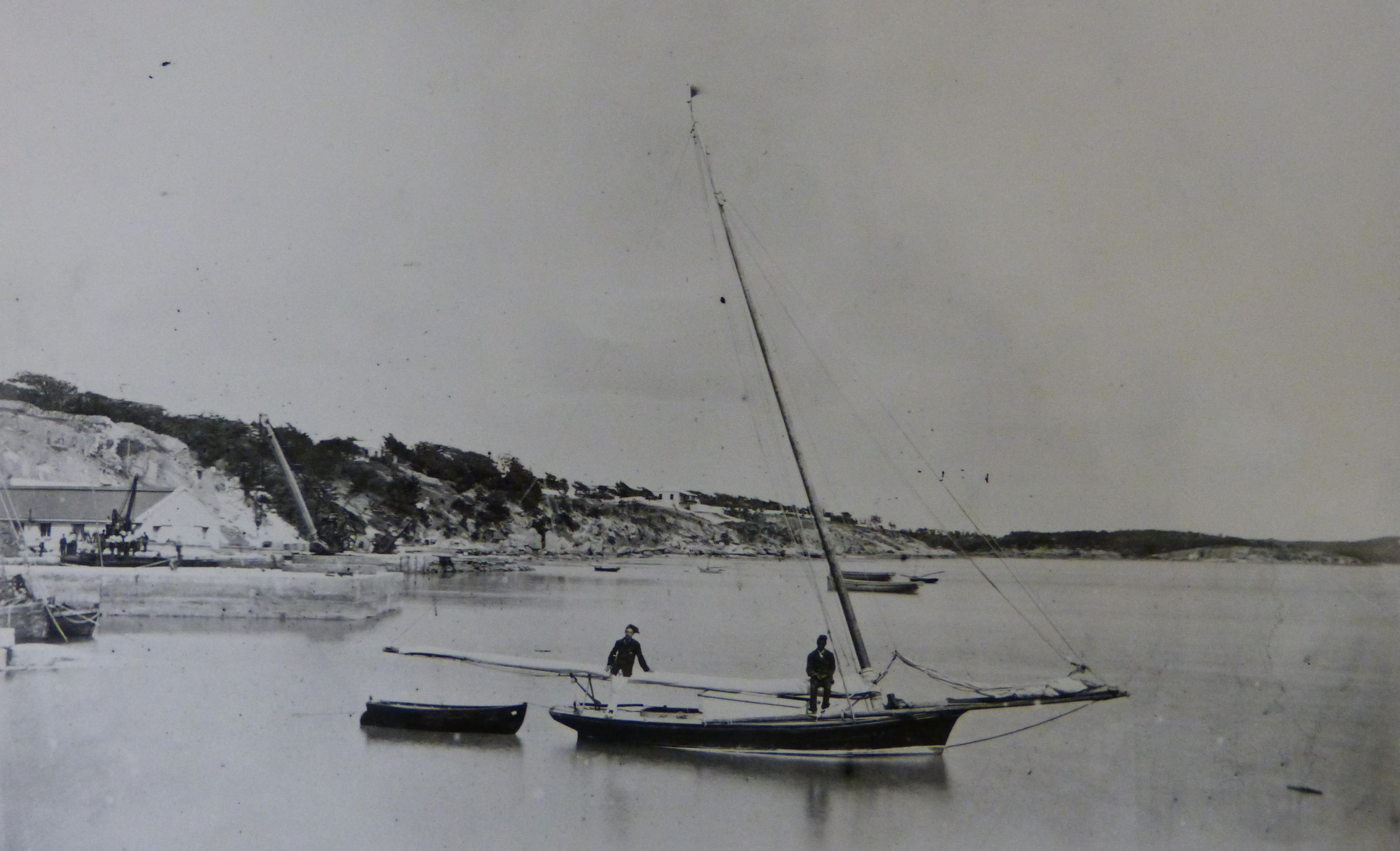
Bermuda rigged sloop at Convict Bay ca 1879

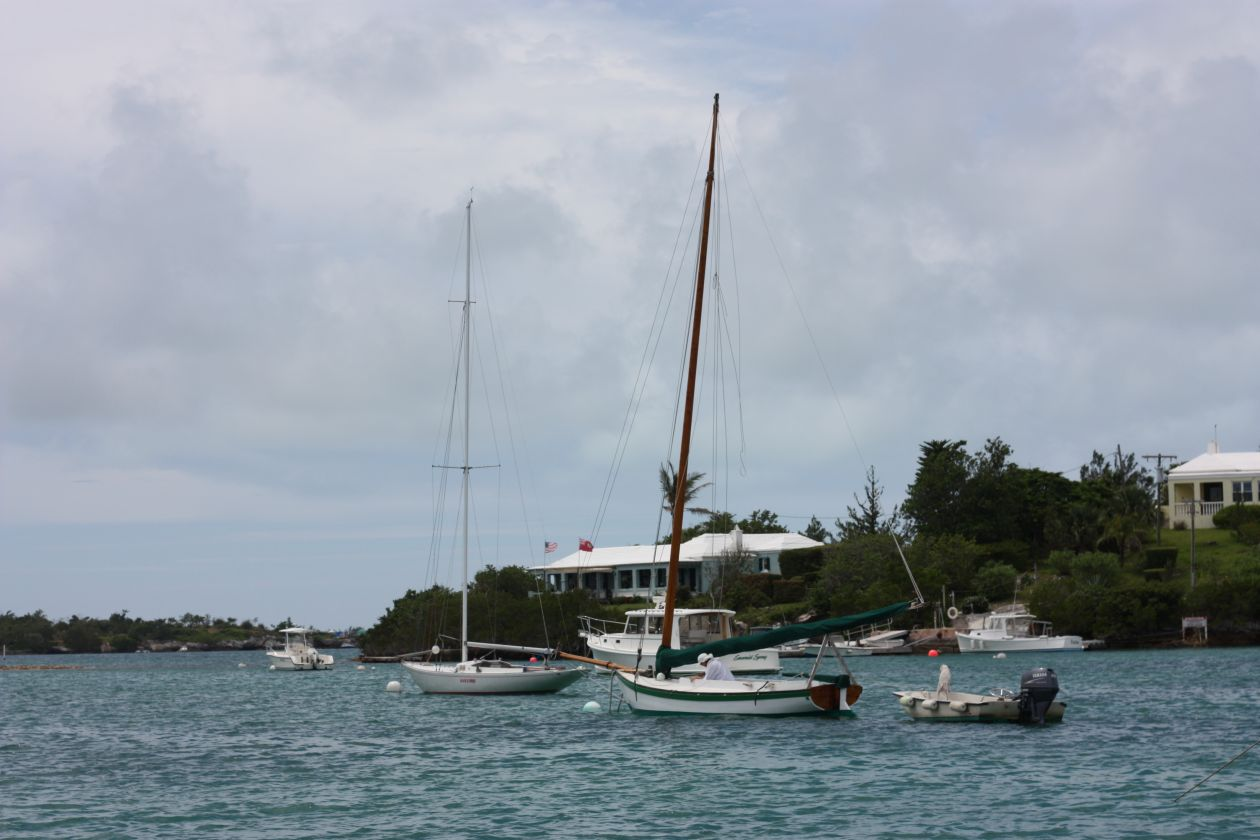
A 19th-century Bermudian working boat in Bermuda

Jamaica was the locus of building fast single-masted vessels that became the model for small cruisers of the Royal Navy. Building of this type of vessel had become more active in Bermuda by the start of 18th century. Bermuda shipbuilders constructed sloops and other vessels, starting in the mid 17th century. Their sloops were gaff-rigged. The first triangular mainsails, characteristic of the Bermuda rig, were introduced on coastal vessels by the 1620s, but most sea-going vessels were gaff-rigged until the 1820s. The sloops were constructed in a range of sizes up to 70 feet (21 m). The most prevalent size for such sloops was in the range of 22 to 28 feet (6.7 to 8.5 m) on deck with a long bowsprit.

Jamaican sloops had beams that were narrower than ocean-going Bermuda sloops, and could attain a speed of around 12 knots. They carried gaff rig, whereas in modern usage, a Bermuda sloop excludes any gaff rig. Jamaican sloops were built usually out of cedar trees, for much the same reasons that Bermudian shipwrights favoured Bermuda cedar: these were very resistant to rot, grew very fast and tall, and had a taste displeasing to marine borers. Cedar was favoured over oak as the latter would rot in about 10 years, while cedar would last for nigh on 30 years and was considerably lighter than oak. When the ships needed to be de-fouled from seaweed and barnacles, pirates needed a safe haven on which to careen the ship. Sloops were well suited for this because they were able to sail in shallow areas where larger ships would either run aground or be unable to sail through at all. These shallow waters also provided protection from ships of the British Royal Navy, which tended to be larger and required deep water to sail safely.

Later in the 19th century, the design of Bermudian vessels had largely dispensed with square topsails and gaff rig, replacing them with triangular main sails and jibs. The Bermuda rig had traditionally been used on vessels with two or more masts, with the gaff rig favoured for single-masted vessels. The reason for this was the increased height necessary for a single mast, which led to too much canvas. The solid wooden masts at that height were also too heavy, and not sufficiently strong. Single-masted sloops quickly became the norm in Bermudian racing, with the introduction of hollow masts and other refinements.

The colony's lightweight Bermuda cedar vessels were widely prized for their agility and speed, especially upwind. The high, raked masts and long bowsprits and booms favoured in Bermuda allowed its vessels of all sizes to carry vast areas of sail when running down-wind with spinnakers and multiple jibs, allowing great speeds to be reached. Bermudian work boats, mostly small sloops, were ubiquitous on the archipelago's waters in the 19th century, moving freight, people, and everything else about. The rig was eventually adopted almost universally on small sailing craft in the 20th Century, although as seen on most modern vessels it is very much less extreme than on traditional Bermudian designs, with lower, vertical masts, shorter booms, omitted bowsprits, and much less area of canvas.

== Merchant and privateering use ==
The Bermuda sloop became the predominant type of sailing vessel both in the Bermudian colony and among sloop rigs worldwide as Bermudian traders visited foreign nations. Soon, shipbuilding became one of the primary trades on the island and ships were exported throughout the English colonies on the American seaboard, in the West Indies, and eventually to Europe. In service of the burgeoning shipbuilding industry, many Bermudian colonists began to cultivate Bermuda cedar instead of lucrative trade crops such as tobacco. The archipelago’s ruling Somers Isles Company, which favored tobacco agriculture, attempted to limit Bermudian shipbuilding, inciting demonstrations, appeals, and unrest. This unrest led to violence, the eventual dissolution of the Somers Isles Company and the archipelago’s transition to royal colony status in 1684.

Bermudians, largely slaves, built roughly a thousand ships during the 18th century. Although many of these were sold abroad, the colony maintained its own large merchant fleet which, thanks partly to the domination of trade in many American seaboard ports by branches of wealthy Bermudian families and partly to the suitability and availability of Bermudian vessels, carried much of the produce exported from the American south to Bermuda and to the West Indies aboard Bermudian mostly slave-manned vessels sailed southwest (more-or-less upwind) to the Turk Islands, where salt was harvested. This salt was carried to North American ports and sold at high profits. Bermudian vessels also developed a trade in moving goods such as grain, cocoa, brandy, wine and more from the Atlantic seaboard colonies to the West Indies.

The threat of piracy and privateering was a large problem for mariners of all nations during the 17th and 18th centuries, but it was also as widely popular an enterprise. During wartime, much of Bermuda's merchant fleet turned to more lucrative labors: privateering. The evasive capabilities highly prized by merchantmen also made Bermuda sloops the ship of choice for the pirates themselves, earlier in the 18th century, as well as for smugglers. They often carried sufficient crew out to return with several prizes, and these extra crew were useful both as movable ballast and in handling the labor-intensive sloops. The shape of the ship enabled Bermudian mariners to excel. The same abilities allowed Bermuda sloops to escape from better-armed privateers and even larger man-of-war British naval ships which, with their square rigs, could not sail as closely to windward. The ability of the sloop rig in general to sail upwind meant a Bermuda sloop could outrun most other sailing ships by simply turning upwind and leaving its pursuers floundering in its wake.

Despite Bermudian privateers preying heavily on American shipping during the American War of Independence, some historians credit the large number of Bermuda sloops (reckoned at well over a thousand) built in Bermuda as privateers and sold illegally to the Americans as enabling the rebellious colonies to win their independence.

== Slavery and the Bermuda sloop ==
The commercial success of the Bermuda sloop must be credited to the contribution of Bermuda's free and enslaved Blacks. For most of the 17th century, Bermuda's agricultural economy was reliant on indentured servants. This meant that slavery did not play the same role as in many other colonies, though privateers based in Bermuda often brought enslaved blacks and Native Americans who had been captured along with ships of enemy nations. The first large influx of blacks was of free men who came as indentured servants in the middle of the century from former Spanish colonies in the West Indies (the increasing numbers of black, Spanish-speaking probable-Catholics alarmed the white Protestant majority, who were also alarmed by native Irish sent to Bermuda to be sold into servitude after the Cromwellian conquest of Ireland, and measures were taken to discourage black immigration and to ban the importation of Irish). After 1684, Bermuda turned wholesale to a maritime economy, and slaves, black, Amerindian, and Irish (the various minorities merged into a single demographic group, known as coloured, which included anyone who was not defined as entirely of European extraction), played an increasing role in this. Black Bermudians became highly skilled shipwrights, blacksmiths and joiners. Many of the shipwrights who helped to develop shipbuilding in the American South, especially on the Virginia shore of the Chesapeake (Bermuda, also known as Virgineola, had once been part of Virginia, and had maintained close connections ever since), were black Bermudian slaves, and the design and success of the area's schooners owes something to them, also.

Due to the large number of white Bermudian men who were away at sea at any one time (and possibly due as much to fear of the larger number of enslaved black Bermudian men left behind) it was mandated that blacks must make up a percentage of the crew of every Bermudian vessel. By the American War of Independence, the use of many able black slaves as sailors added considerably to the power of the Bermudian merchant fleet due to their highly needed skill set, and these included the crews of Bermudian privateers. When the Americans captured the Bermudian privateer Regulator, they discovered that virtually all of her crew were black slaves. Authorities in Boston offered these men their freedom, but nearly all of the 70 captives elected to be treated as prisoners of war, claiming slavery was all they knew and out of fear for their families who were still in Bermuda. Sent to New York on the sloop Duxbury, those who were left seized the vessel and sailed it back to Bermuda.

Slavery was not abolished in Bermuda until ordered by the British Government in 1834, though the Royal Navy had already made frequent use of Bermuda sloops in suppressing the trans-Atlantic slave trade (having formed the West Africa Squadron to this end in 1808, following passage of the Slave Trade Act 1807).

== Bermudian work boats ==
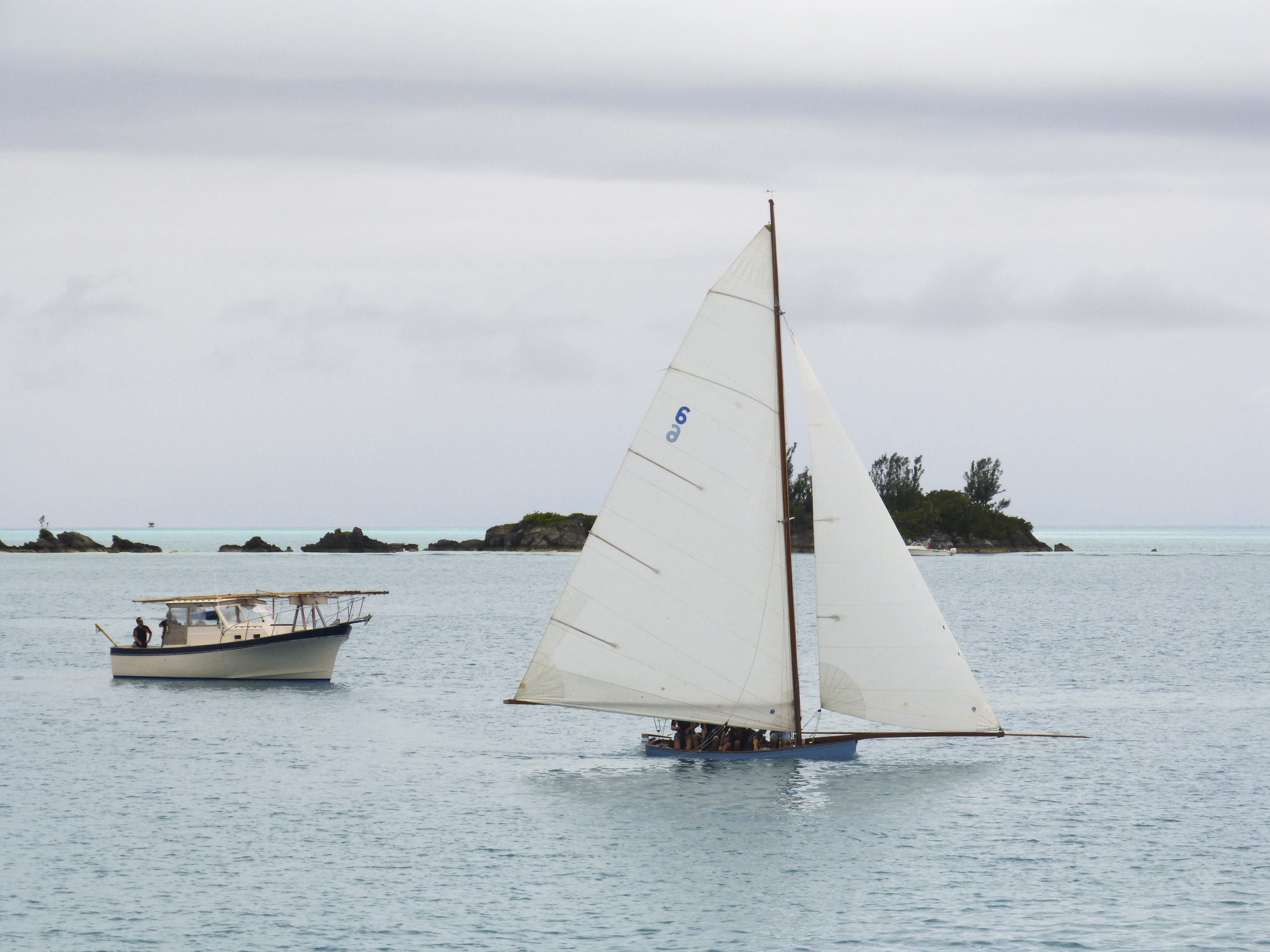
Bermuda Fitted Dinghy at Mangrove Bay

The term Bermuda sloop was also to describe the working boats historically used for moving freight about Bermuda's islands, for fishing, and other coastal activities, and today is used to designate any single-masted yacht with Bermuda rig. Motor vehicles were banned in Bermuda until after the Second World War, and the roads were few and poor until the requirements of that war advanced their development. Boats, as a consequence, remained the primary method of moving people and materials around Bermuda well into the 20th century. Although such small sloops are rare today, the design was further scaled down to produce the Bermuda Fitted Dinghy, a class of racing vessel used in traditional competition between Bermudian yacht clubs. The term Bermuda sloop has come to be used outside Bermuda, today, to describe any single masted, Bermuda rigged boat, also known as Marconi sloops, although most are far less extreme in their design than was once the norm in Bermuda, with bowsprits omitted, masts vertical and shortened, and booms similarly shortened. Spinnaker booms and multiple jibs are rarely seen. The reduced sail area makes modern boats much more manageable, especially for small or inexperienced crews.
