= Bermuda rig =

Configuration of mast and rigging for a type of sailboat

J-class cutter-rigged sail plan with Bermuda mainsail c. 1930

Bermuda rig, Bermudian rig, or Marconi rig is a type of sailing rig that uses a triangular sail set abaft (behind) the mast. It is the typical configuration for most modern sailboats. Whilst commonly seen in sloop-rigged vessels, Bermuda rig is used in a range of configurations, for instance, a cutter or a schooner (where it may be used in conjunction with gaff rigged sails on other masts), and several other types.

Bermuda rig takes its name from Bermuda, where it was developed in the 17th century. The term Marconi, a reference to the inventor of the radio, Guglielmo Marconi, became associated with this configuration in the early 20th century, because the wires that stabilize the mast of a Bermuda rig reminded observers of the wires on early radio masts.

== Description ==
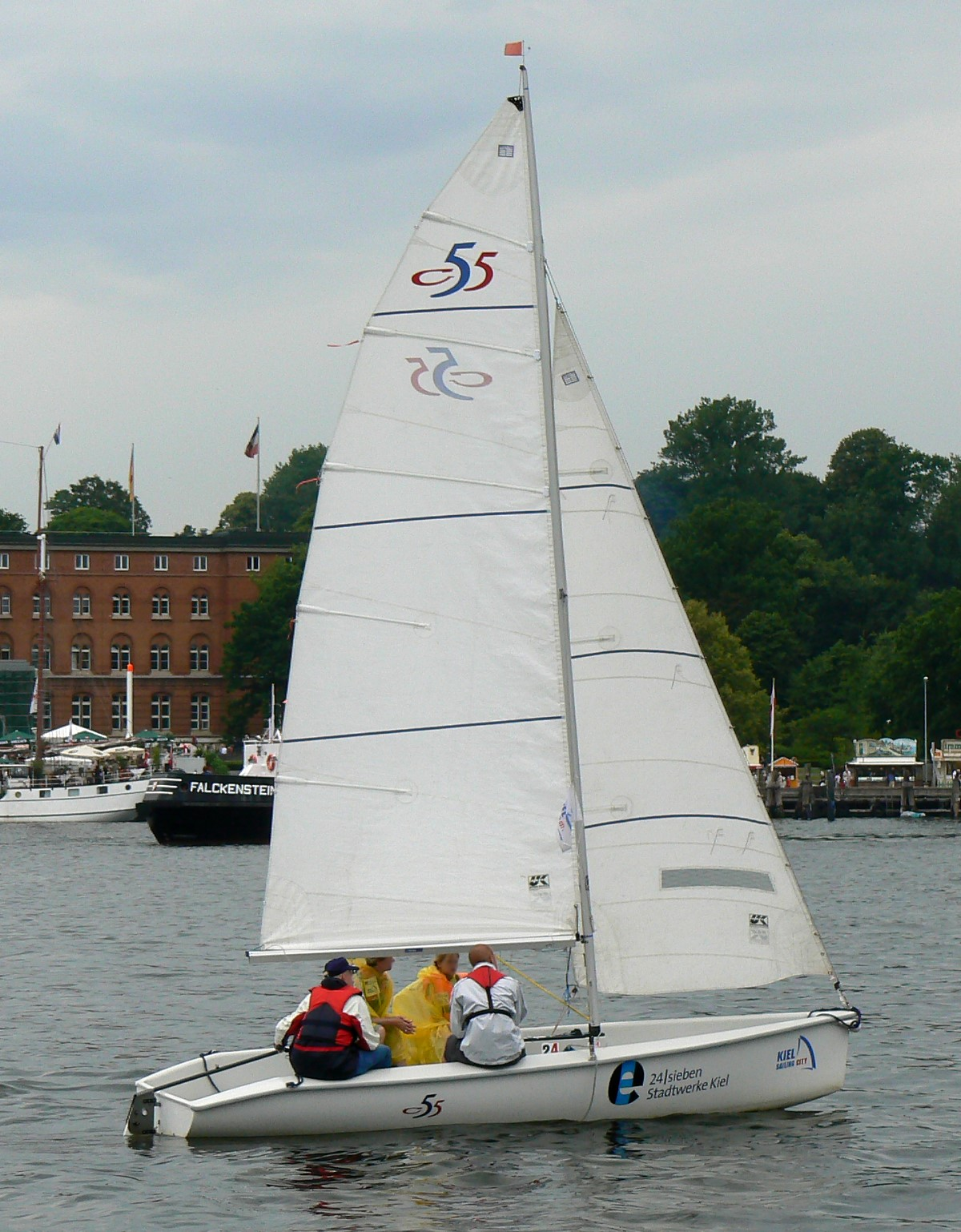
Bermuda rig in its most common form, a Bermuda sloop-rigged dinghy

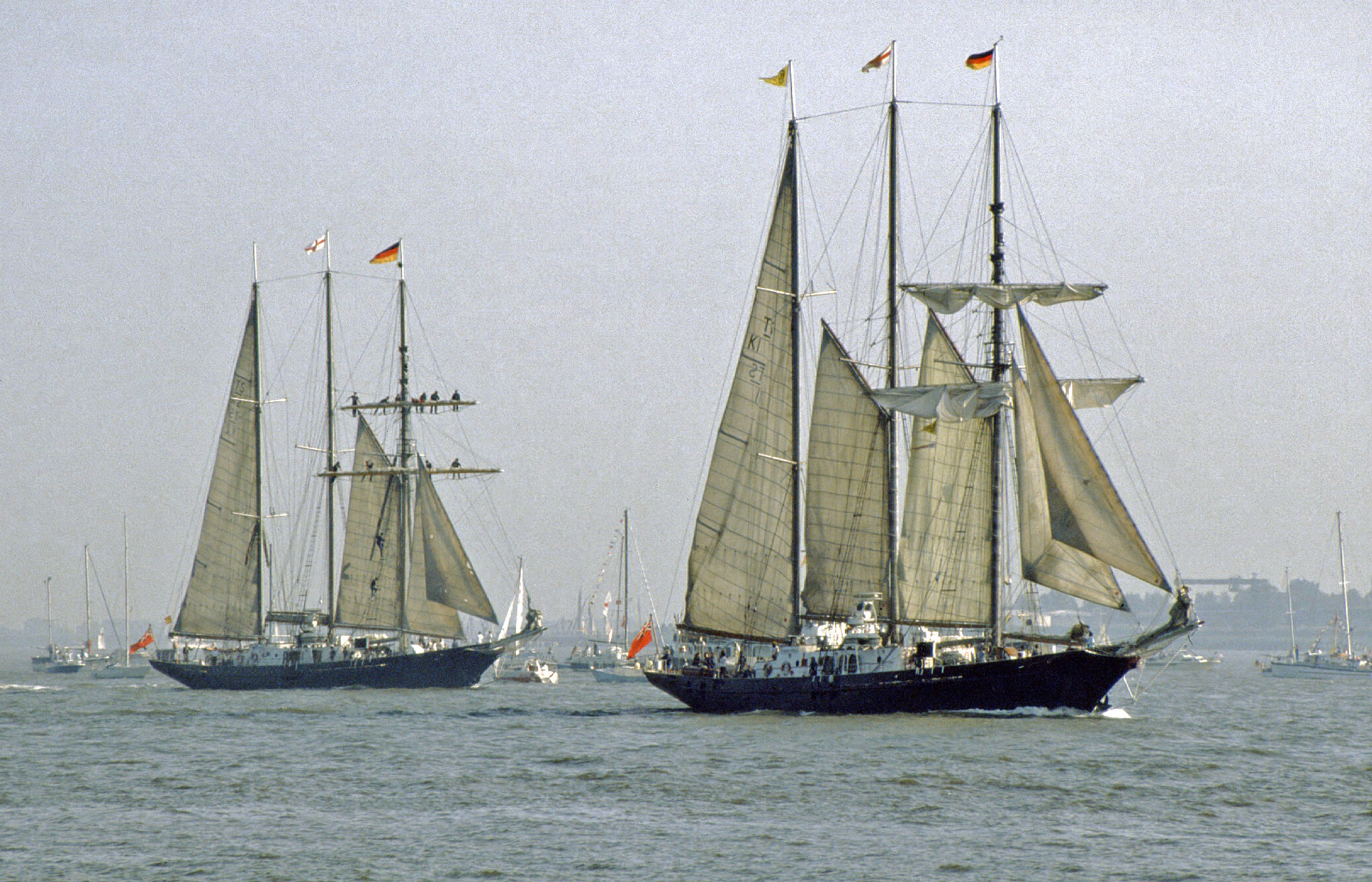
Vessels with a combination of Bermuda and gaff-rigged masts

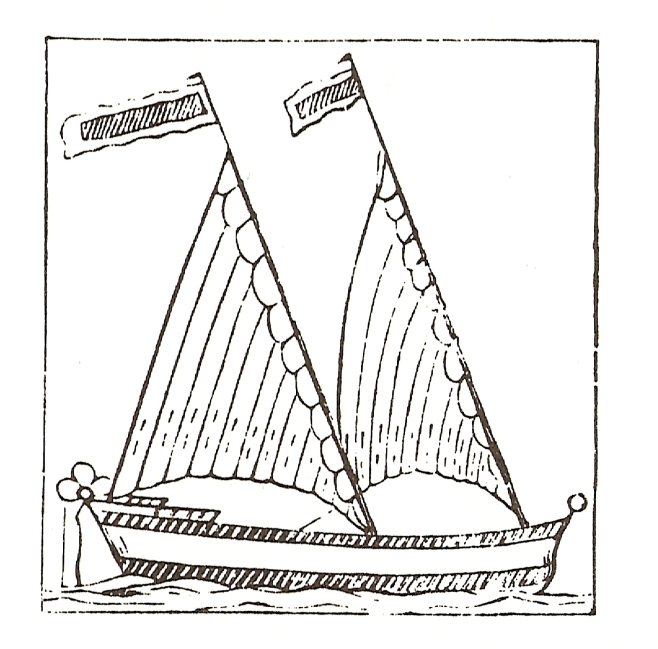
1671 woodcut of a Bermudian vessel with early Bermuda rig (before the addition of a boom)

The rig consists of a triangular sail set abaft (behind) the mast with its head raised to the top of the mast; its luff runs down the mast and is normally attached to it for its entire length; its tack is usually attached to the gooseneck; its foot (in modern versions of the rig) controlled by a boom; and its clew attached to the after end of the boom, which is controlled by its sheet.

Originally developed for smaller Bermudian vessels, and ultimately adapted to the larger, ocean-going Bermuda sloop, in which the Bermuda sail is set as the mainsail on the main mast. The Bermuda rigging has largely replaced the older gaff rigged fore-and-aft sails, except notably on schooners. The traditional design as developed in Bermuda features very tall, raked masts, a long bowsprit, and may or may not have a boom. In some configurations such as the Bermuda Fitted Dinghy vast areas of sail are achieved with this rig. Elsewhere, however, the design has omitted the bowsprit, and has otherwise become less extreme.

A Bermuda rigged sloop with a single jib is known as a Bermuda sloop, a Marconi sloop, or a Marconi rig. A Bermuda sloop may also be a more specific type of vessel such as a small sailing ships traditional in Bermuda which may or may not be Bermuda rigged.

The foot of a Bermuda sail may be attached to the boom along its length, or in some modern rigs the sail is attached to the boom only at its ends. This modern variation of a Bermuda mainsail is known as a loose-footed main. In some early Bermudian vessels, the mainsails were attached only to the mast and deck, lacking booms. This is the case on two of the three masts of the newly built Spirit of Bermuda, a replica of an 1830s British Royal Navy sloop-of-war. Additional sails were also often mounted on traditional Bermudian craft, when running down wind, which included a spinnaker, with a spinnaker boom, and additional jibs.

The main controls on a Bermuda sail are:

- The cunningham tightens the luff of a boom-footed sail by pulling downward on a cringle in the luff of a mainsail above the tack.
- The halyard used to raise the head, and sometimes to tension the luff.
- The outhaul used to tension the foot by hauling the clew towards the end of the boom.
- The sheet used to haul the boom down and towards the center of the boat.
- The vang or kicking strap which runs between a point partway along the boom and the base of the mast, and is used to provide a downward force on the boom, which helps to prevent excessive twist in the leach, particularly when reaching or running.

== History ==
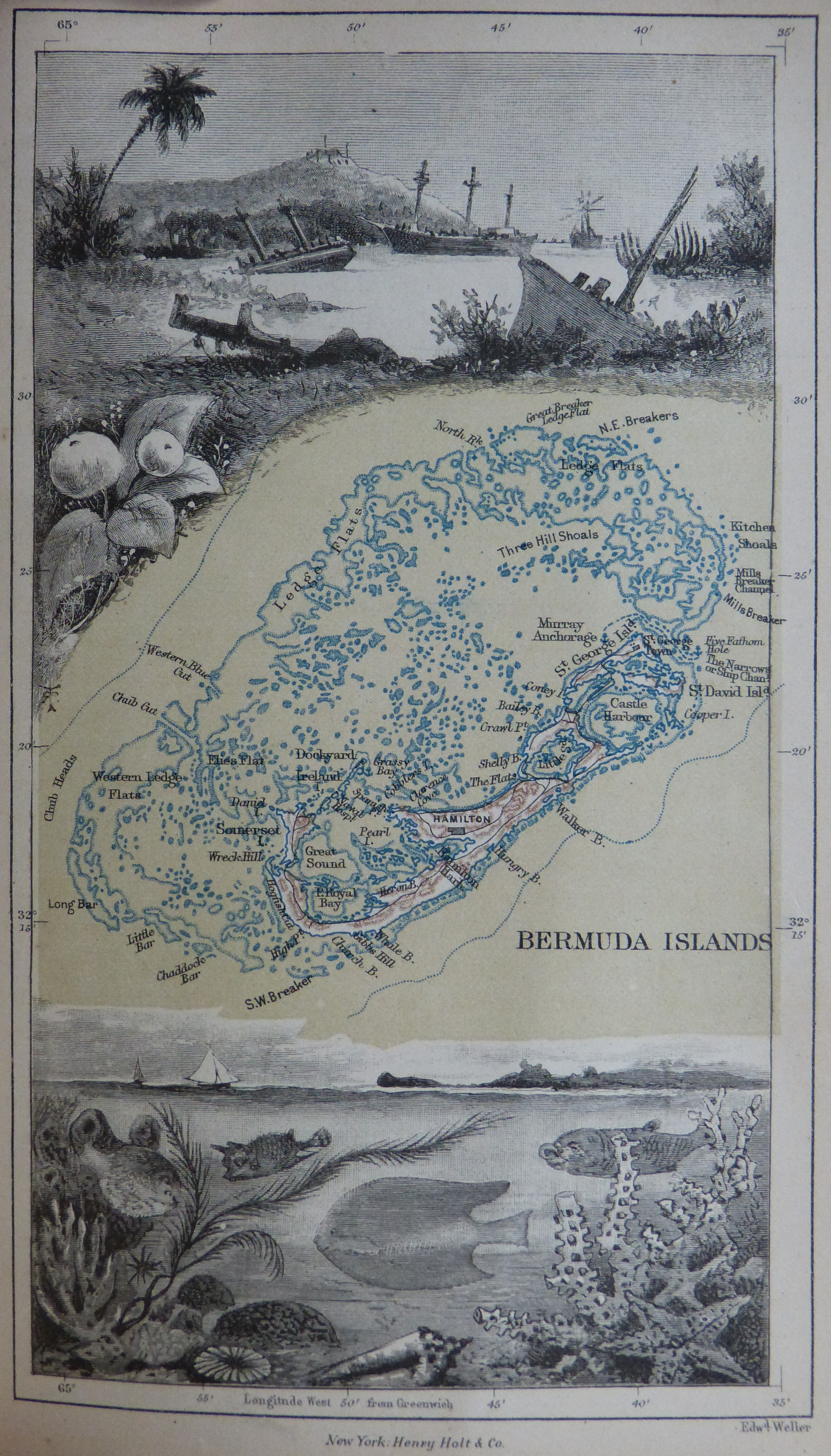
1885 map of Bermuda and its reefs by Anna Brassey, illustrating the perils of tacking in Bermuda's waters.

The development of the rig is thought to have begun with fore-and-aft rigged boats built by a Dutch-born Bermudian in the 17th century. The Dutch were influenced by Moorish lateen rigs introduced during Spain's rule of their country. The Dutch eventually modified the design by omitting the masts, with the yard arms of the lateens being stepped in thwarts. By this process, the yards became raked masts. Lateen sails mounted this way were known as leg-of-mutton sails in English. The Dutch called a vessel rigged in this manner a bezaanjacht (lit. 'mizzen yacht'). A bezaanjacht is visible in a painting of King Charles II arriving in Rotterdam in 1660. After sailing on such a vessel, Charles was so impressed that his eventual successor, the Prince of Orange presented him with a copy of his own, which Charles named Bezaan. The rig had been introduced to Bermuda some decades before this. Captain John Smith reported that Captain Nathaniel Butler, who was the governor of Bermuda from 1619 to 1622, employed the Dutch boat builder, Jacob Jacobsen, one of the crew of a Dutch frigate which had been wrecked on Bermuda, who quickly established a leading position among Bermuda's boat makers, reportedly building and selling more than a hundred boats within the space of three years (to the resentment of many of his competitors, who were forced to emulate his designs). A poem published by John H. Hardie in 1671 described Bermuda's boats such: "With tripple corner'd Sayls they always float, About the Islands, in the world there are, None in all points that may with them compare."

Ships with somewhat similar rigs were in fact recorded in Holland during the 1600s. These early Bermuda rigged boats evidently lacked jibs or booms, and the masts appear not to have been as robust as they were to become (a boat rigged with a Bermuda or gaff mainsail and no jib would today be known as a catboat). In 1675, Samuel Fortrey, of Kew, wrote to the naval administrator and Member of Parliament, Samuel Pepys, a treatise entitled Of Navarchi, suggesting the improvement of the Bermoodn rig with the addition of a boom, but evidently nothing came of this. Bermudian builders did introduce these innovations themselves, though when they first appeared has been lost to record.

By the 1800s, the design of Bermudian vessels had largely dispensed with square topsails and gaff rig, replacing them with triangular main sails and jibs. The Bermuda rig had traditionally been used on vessels with two or more masts, with the gaff rig favoured for single-masted vessels. The reason for this was the increased height necessary for a single mast, which led to too much canvas. The solid wooden masts at that height were also too heavy, and not sufficiently strong. This changed when the boats began to be raced in the early 1800s. H. G. Hunt, a naval officer (and possibly the Henry G. Hunt who was the Acting Governor of Bermuda in 1835) concluded in the 1820s that a single-masted sloop would be superior to the schooner he had been racing and was proved correct when the yacht he had commissioned won a secret race against a schooner the night before a public race, and the public race itself the following day. Single-masted sloops quickly became the norm in Bermudian racing, with the introduction of hollow masts and other refinements.

The colony's lightweight Bermuda cedar vessels were widely prized for their agility and speed, especially upwind. The high, raked masts and long bowsprits and booms favoured in Bermuda allowed its vessels of all sizes to carry vast areas of sail when running down-wind with spinnakers and multiple jibs, allowing great speeds to be reached. Bermudian work boats, mostly small sloops, were ubiquitous on the archipelago's waters in the 1800s, moving freight, people, and everything else about. The rig was eventually adopted almost universally on small sailing craft in the 1900s, although as seen on most modern vessels it is very much less extreme than on traditional Bermudian designs, with lower, vertical masts, shorter booms, omitted bowsprits, and much less area of canvas.

The term Marconi rig was first applied to the tall Bermuda rig used on larger racing yachts, such as the J class used since 1914 for the America's Cup international yacht races, as - with the many supporting cables required - it reminded observers of Guglielmo Marconi's mast-like wireless antennas (Marconi's first demonstrations in the United States took place in the autumn of 1899, with the reporting of the America's Cup at New York). Although sometimes treated as interchangeable with Bermuda rig generally, some purists insist that Marconi rig refers only to the very tall Bermuda rig used on yachts like the J-class.

== Gallery ==
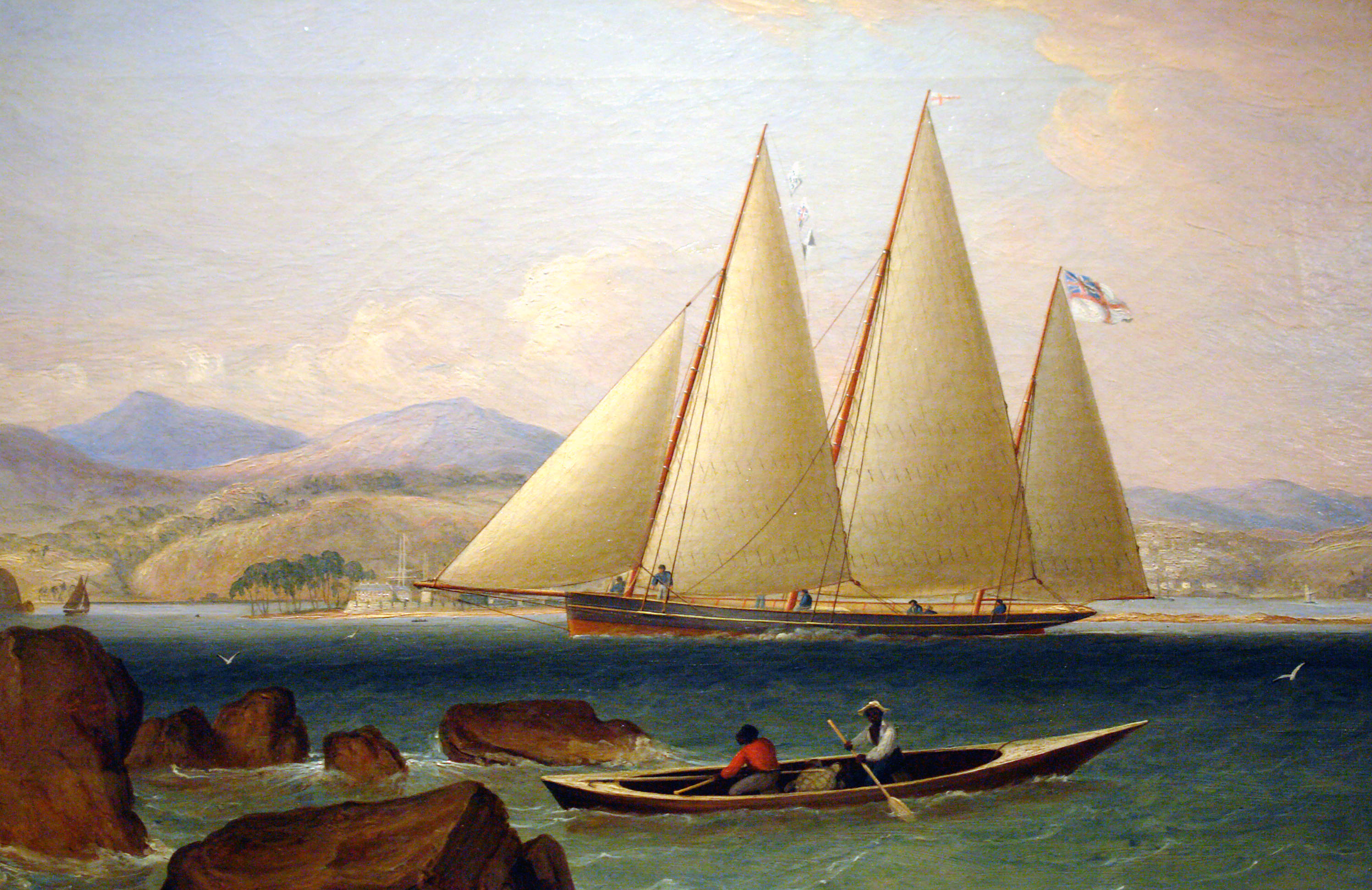
The 1831 painting, by John Lynn, of the Bermuda sloop of the Royal Navy upon which the Spirit of Bermuda was modelled

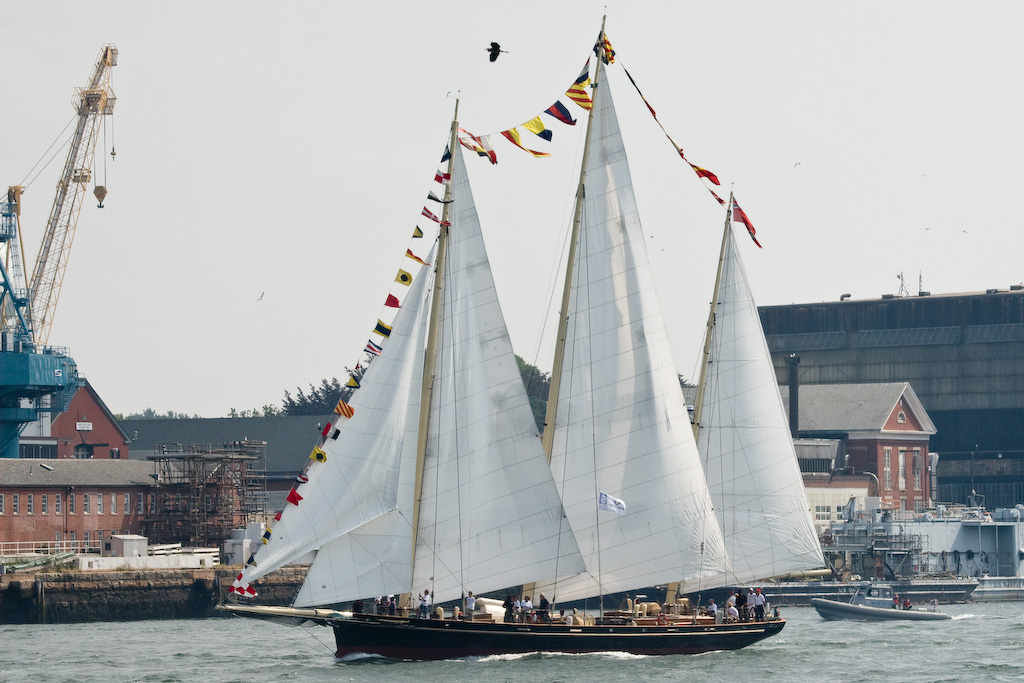
Bermuda-rigged training sloop, Spirit of Bermuda.

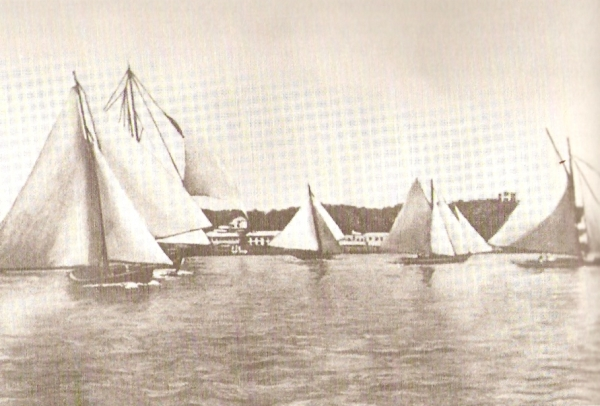
A 19th-century race in Bermuda. Visible are three Bermuda rigged and two gaff rigged sloops.

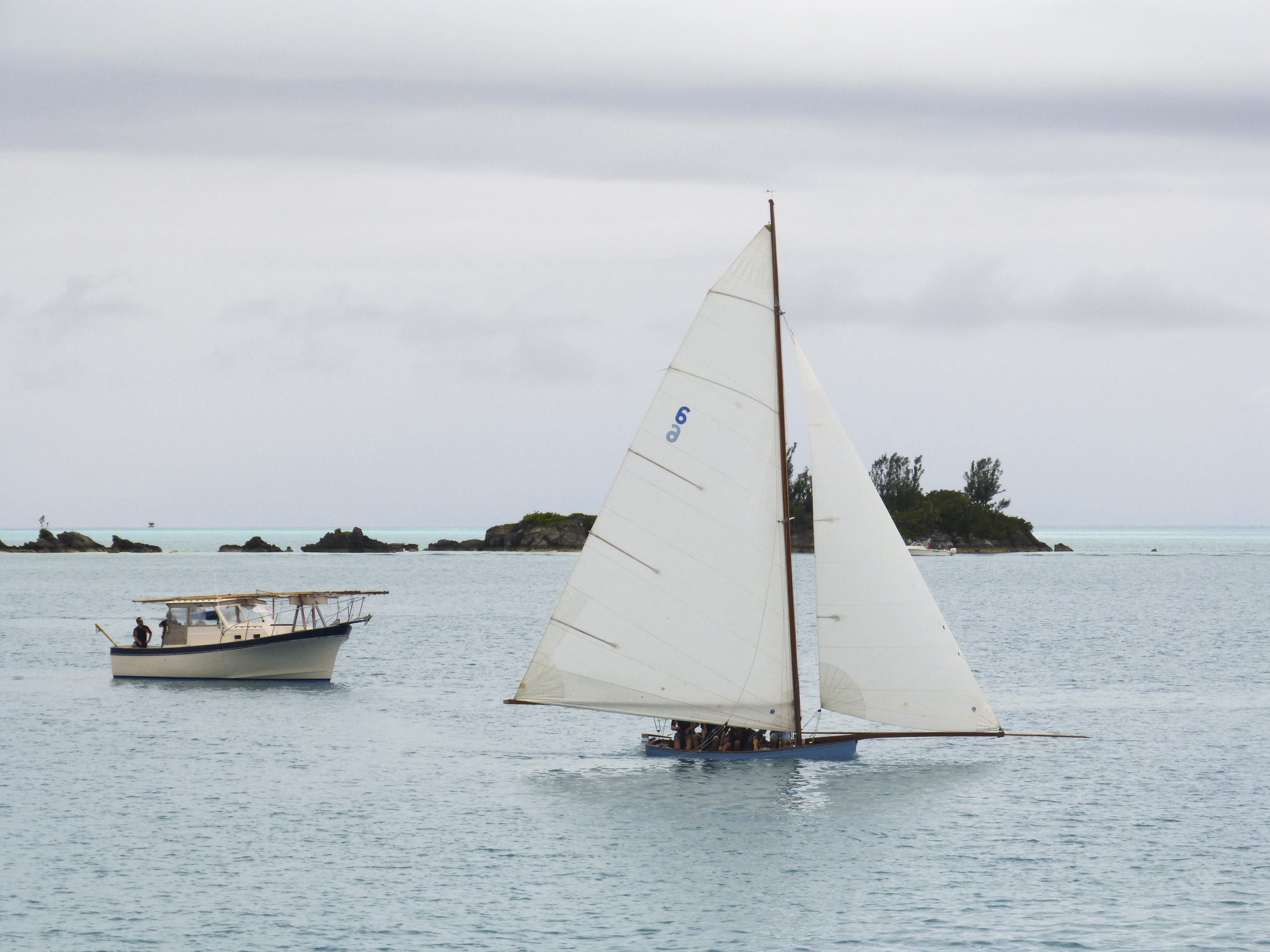
Bermuda-fitted dinghy at Mangrove Bay in 2016

== See also ==
- Glossary of nautical terms (A–L)
- Glossary of nautical terms (M–Z)
- B&R rig
- Masthead rig
- Fractional rig

== Sources ==
- Sailing in Bermuda: Sail Racing in the Nineteenth Century, by J.C. Arnell, 1982. Published by the Royal Hamilton Amateur Dinghy Club. Printed by the University of Toronto Press.
