= Royal Newfoundland Yacht Club =

Yacht club in Newfoundland

- Short name: RNYC
- Founded: 1960
- Location: Long Pond, Newfoundland and Labrador, Canada
- Commodore: Anderson Noel
- Website: www.rnyc.nf.ca

The Royal Newfoundland Yacht Club at Long Pond on Conception Bay, Newfoundland was created in 1960 from the amalgamation of the Newfoundland Yacht Club, founded in 1928, and the Avalon Yacht Club, founded on the 22 July 1936. It was granted the Royal designation by Queen Elizabeth II in 1965. It was incorporated in 1976.
