= Royal Kennebeccasis Yacht Club =

- Short name: RKYC
- Founded: 1894
- Location: Saint John, New Brunswick, Canada
- Commodore: Colleen Sullivan
- Website: rkyc.ca

The Royal Kennebeccasis Yacht Club was established in 1894 in Saint John, New Brunswick, Canada, and received its Royal Warrant from Queen Victoria in 1898. In 1899, The Club published her Constitution, by-laws, sailing regulations, yacht routine, list of members, list of yachts, and signal code The club is located at Brothers' Cove, where the Kennebecasis river meets the Saint John river. The tower of the Royal Kennebeccasis Yacht Club has been a beacon to boaters since its construction at the turn of the 20th century.
