= Royal Bermuda Yacht Club =

- Ensign
- Short name: RBYC
- Founded: November 1, 1844; 181 years ago
- Location: City of Hamilton, Pembroke Parish, Bermuda
- Commodore: Craig Davis
- Website: rbyc.bm

The Royal Bermuda Yacht Club (RBYC) is a private yacht club that was established as the Bermuda Yacht Club on 1 November, 1844, after the sport of racing yachts had become established in Bermuda primarily as a pastime of idle officers of the Bermuda Garrison and the Royal Naval Dockyard, Bermuda. In 1845, Prince Albert consented to become Patron of the Club and in 1846 the club was permitted to add the adjective "Royal" to its name. The RBYC flies the Blue Ensign with the RBYC badge.

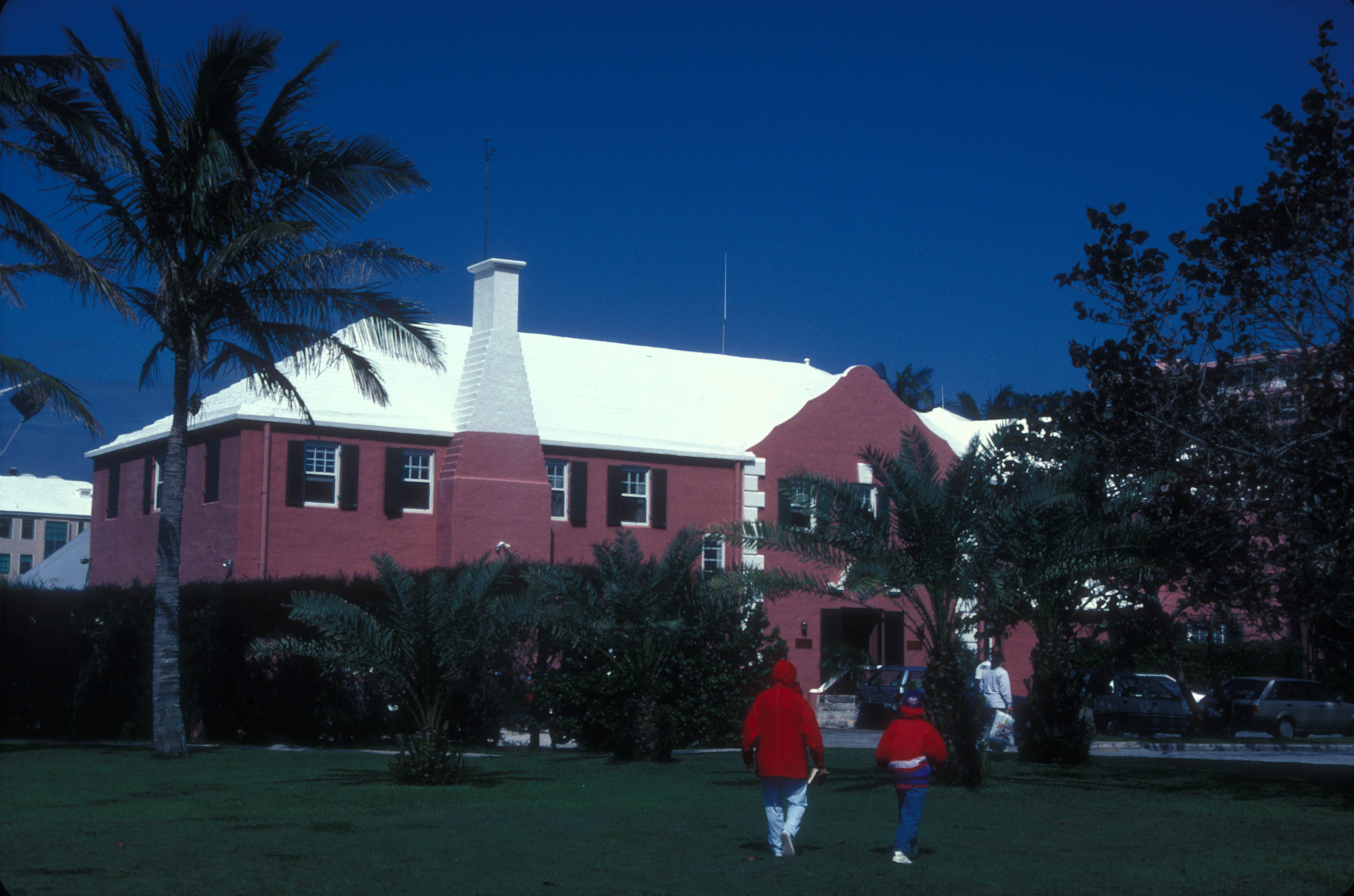
The Yacht Club's building was built in the 1930s

In 1933, the club moved to its current site at Albuoy's Point, Hamilton. Currently the club has about 850 resident and non-resident members.

The club is also the third oldest 'Royal' club outside the British Isles.

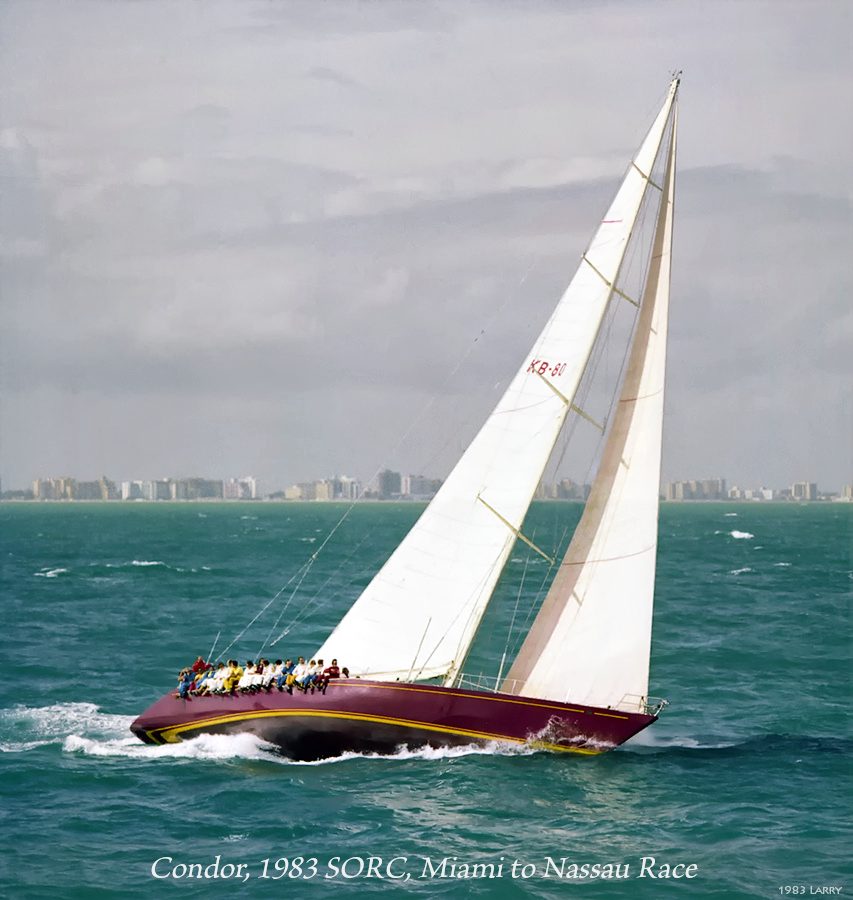
Condor racing yacht, registered at Hamilton

The club has co-hosted the biannual Bermuda Race from 1906 to 1926 with various American yacht clubs, and since 1926 with the Cruising Club of America. It also currently hosts the Charleston Bermuda Race.

== Cocktail ==
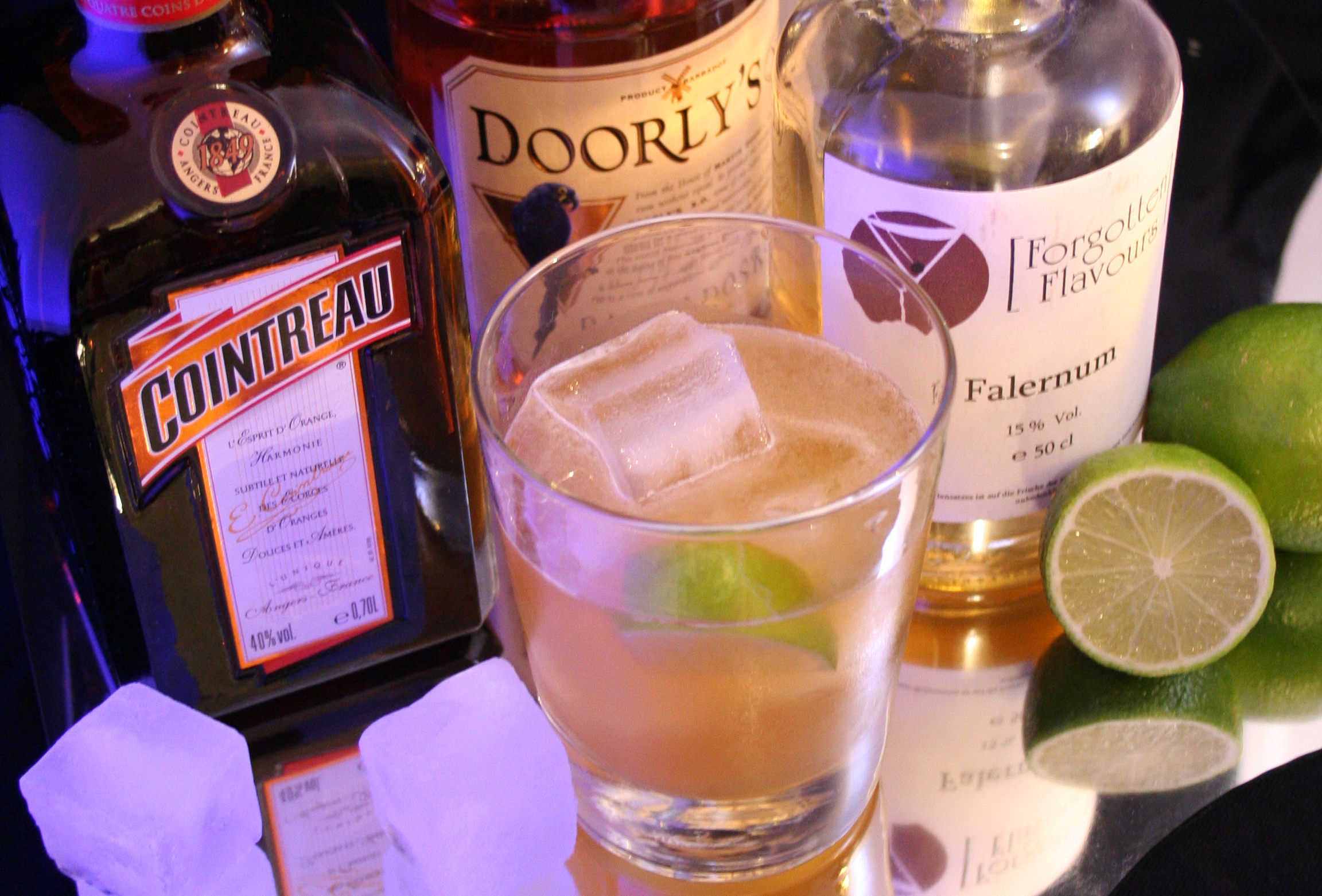
Royal Bermuda Yacht Club cocktail and ingredients (not photographed at the club)

The RBYC gave name to the Royal Bermuda (Yacht Club) Cocktail, a variant of the daiquiri that contains Barbados rum, fresh lime juice, Cointreau, and falernum, recorded since 1941.

== See also ==
- Royal Hamilton Amateur Dinghy Club
- Sport in Bermuda
