= New York City Police Department corruption and misconduct =

Overview of misconduct and corruption in the NYPD

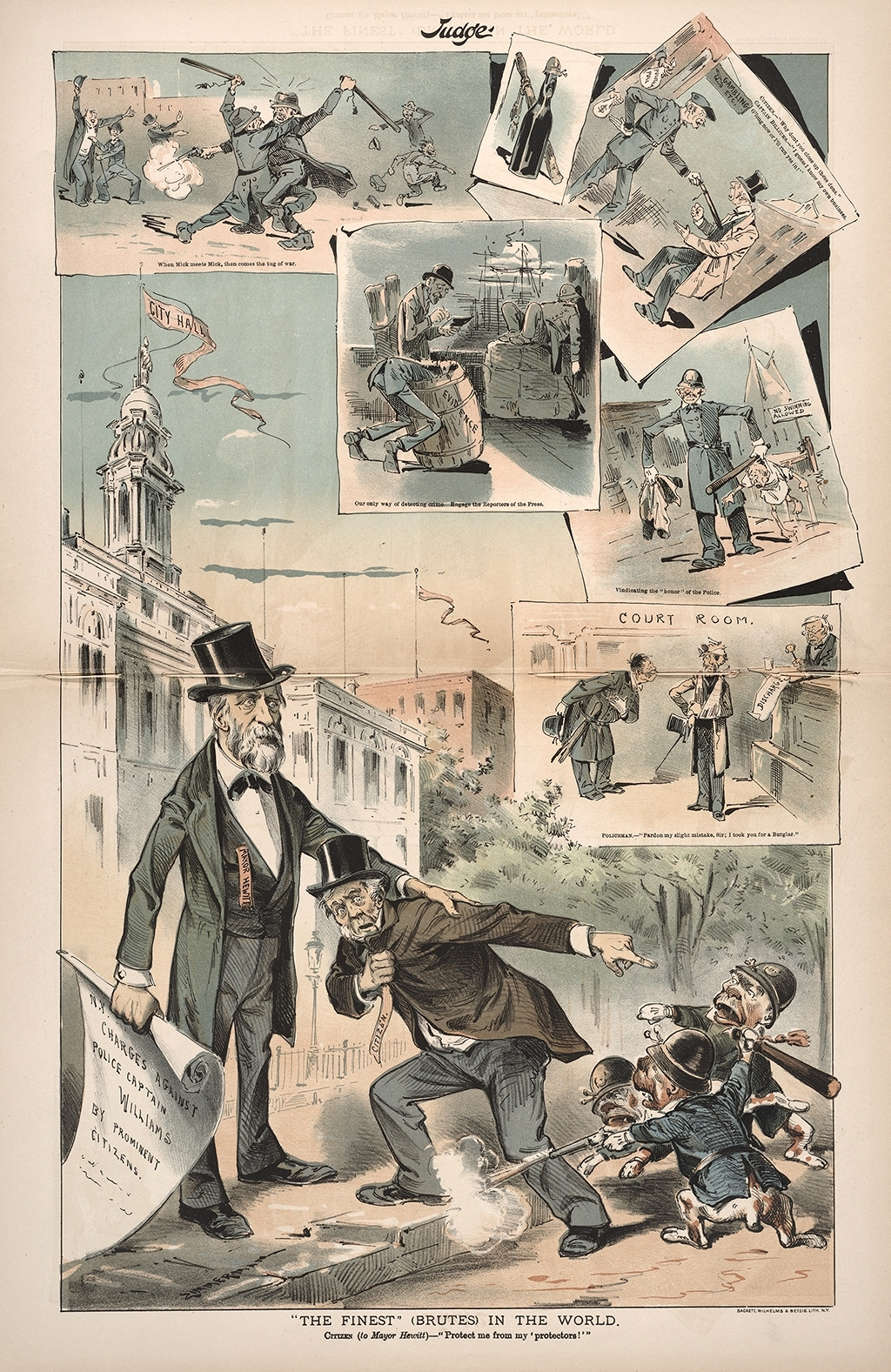
Civilian asking New York Mayor Abram Hewitt for protection from the police, Judge, 1887

Throughout the history of the New York City Police Department, numerous instances of corruption, misconduct, and other allegations of such have occurred. Over 12,000 cases resulted in lawsuits settlements totaling over $400 million during the five years ending in 2014. In 2019, misconduct lawsuits cost the taxpayer $68,688,423, a 76 percent increase over the previous year, including about $10 million paid out to two exonerated individuals who had been falsely convicted and imprisoned.

Criminal justice advocates report that public access to information about NYPD misconduct is increasingly constrained, particularly due to the department's controversial 2016 reinterpretation of section 50-a of the New York Civil Rights Law. In June 2020, the Eric Garner Anti-Chokehold Act was passed, which repealed 50-a and made the use of certain restraints by police anywhere in the state of New York punishable by up to 15 years in prison.

== History ==
The Floyd v. New York decision in 2013 established a role for a court-appointed monitor to oversee the NYPD's efforts to reform (particularly regarding stop-and-frisk practices) and comply with the Constitution. As of 2026, the monitor is Mylan Denerstein.

In 2024, the city paid $206 million to settle cases involving police and prosecutorial misconduct across 953 cases with around 64% being wrongful convictions.

== Misconduct involving one victim ==
=== 1950s–1990s ===
==== Arrest of Frank Lino ====
In 1962, Bonanno family soldier Frank Lino was arrested for his alleged involvement in the fatal shootings of two Brooklyn police detectives. The detectives, aged 28 and 56, were shot dead during a holdup of a tobacco store in Gravesend, Brooklyn by two armed men, who got away with $5,000. Lino was charged with the murders after providing one of the robbers with a car so he could flee to Chicago. After being charged, he was taken to the 66th Precinct for an interrogation. During Lino's interrogation, he claimed that police officers drove staples into his hands and a broomstick up his rectum. He alleged that the abuse resulted in a broken leg and arm. Lino was later released on three years probation after he threatened to sue the city for police brutality. He also claimed that the uncontrollable blinking of his eyes he suffered for the rest of his life, was a direct result of the alleged beating.

==== Shooting of Clifford Glover ====
On April 28, 1973, Officer Thomas Shea shot 10-year-old Clifford Glover while in South Jamaica, Queens, thinking Glover had a gun. On June 12, 1974, Shea was acquitted of wrongdoing by 11 white and one black jurors but was fired from the NYPD that year.

==== Beating death of Israel Rodriguez ====
On June 13, 1975, Officer Thomas Ryan arrested Israel Rodriguez on attempted murder charges. Luis Santiago and three others had held Rodriguez and beat him on the roof of his building, forcing Rodriguez to hand over his stash of narcotics. After arriving at the scene in response to being called about a burglary, Officers Ryan and Brown arrested Santiago and three others who were armed and in possession of narcotics. Ryan asked Santiago where they had come from, and Santiago directed Ryan to Rodriguez's apartment. Ryan then took Santiago to Rodriguez's door and ordered him to knock on the door. When Rodriguez saw Santiago, he fired through the door, thinking that Santiago had returned to do him additional harm. Ryan entered Rodriguez's apartment, subdued him, and placed him under arrest. After confiscating narcotics from the apartments, Rodriguez and Santiago were both beaten before being transported to the 44th Precinct. Rodriguez subsequently died from injuries sustained during the beatings. In 1977, Ryan was convicted of criminally negligent homicide. In 1979, Ryan jumped bail on the day he was to begin serving his sentence and remained at large until 1981 when he turned himself over to the Queens' district attorney.

==== Shooting of Randolph Evans ====
On November 25, 1976, Officer Robert Torsney shot Randolph Evans to death while responding to a call at Evans's home, a Brooklyn housing project. Torsney was found not guilty by insanity defense (automatism of Penfield epilepsy) in 1977 and was committed to Queens Creedmoor Psychiatric Hospital until July 1979 when state reviewers declared him no longer a threat to himself or society and released him, although he was still denied a disability pension.

==== Chokehold of Michael Stewart ====
On September 15, 1983, Michael Jerome Stewart was arrested for spray painting graffiti on a wall of Manhattan's First Avenue station. He was violent with the officers, ran to the street, lost consciousness, and died on September 28, 1983. In October 1983, the case went before a grand jury in Manhattan, but was dismissed seven months later when a juror was found to have violated court orders by conducting a private investigation into the charges. In February 1984, a second grand jury indicted three officers with criminally negligent homicide, assault, and perjury, while three other officers were only charged with perjury. Jury selection started in June 1985. On November 24, 1985, all six of the indicted officers were acquitted at trial. In 1987, the eleven involved officers and the MTA were sued for $40 million. In August 1990, Stewart's parents and siblings settled out of court for $1.7 million.

==== Shooting of Eleanor Bumpurs ====
On October 29, 1984, after threatening to throw boiling lye on Housing Authority personnel attempting to evict her, police forced their way into Eleanor Bumpurs's public housing apartment, where she lived alone. Her adult daughters wanted her to be hospitalized because she was schizophrenic with hallucinations. Although NYPD procedure required a City psychiatrist to be called in a case of involuntary hospitalization, none was summoned to the scene. Bumpurs was being evicted, supposedly for nonpayment of rent. Although NYPD procedure required a City marshal to be present and restricted the role of police to protecting the marshal and the marshal's assistants, no marshal was summoned to the scene. It later turned out that she had paid her rent as usual but had not been informed of a recent rent increase. When police broke down the door, the elderly woman was standing at the far end of a hallway with a kitchen knife in her raised hand. The police attempted to restrain her by pinning her against a wall with an extended Y-shaped pole, but she swept away the pole and charged the officers. When the lead officer tripped and fell to the floor, she stood over him and attempted to stab him with the knife. Officer Stephen Sullivan fired two shots from his 12-gauge shotgun, sending one pellet into Bumpurs' hand and nine other pellets into her chest, killing her. Sullivan was tried and acquitted in 1987. In 1990, the city ended the legal proceedings by agreeing to pay $200,000 to the Bumpurs family estate.

==== Stun gun coercion of Mark Davidson ====
On April 17, 1985, Mark Davidson was arrested by undercover detectives on charges of drug dealing and taken to the NYPD's 106th precinct in Ozone Park, Queens, where he was beaten and tortured with a stun gun and threatened with torture on his genitals to make a false confession. On May 3, 1986, Sgt. Richard Pike, Jeffrey Gilbert, and Loren MacLary were each convicted of assault and were sentenced to four to six years.

==== Shooting of Edmund Perry ====
On June 12, 1985, Edmund and his brother, Jonah, were walking in Morningside Park where they encountered Lee Van Houten, an undercover plainclothes detective on car burglary patrol. Perry tried to rob Van Houten by grabbing his neck. Van Houten fell to the ground and fired three shots, at least one in Perry's stomach, killing him immediately. Two witnesses supported Van Houten's version of the incident, resulting in no charges being filed. Jonah Perry was found not guilty of mugging the officer in 1986. The NYPD settled a wrongful death suit related to Edmund Perry in 1989, paying money damages to the Perry family.

==== Shooting of Jose Garcia ====
On July 3, 1992, Jose Garcia died from gunshots fired by undercover officer Michael O'Keefe after Garcia was chased into a building in Washington Heights. Police asserted that Garcia, a known street drug dealer, had been carrying a concealed weapon. But witnesses to the struggle and residents of Washington Heights said they believed the shooting death of Garcia was unwarranted, triggering demonstrations on the block where Garcia was killed. "Fires were set," according to a report of the demonstrations published by the New York Times, adding that "a car was overturned and debris rained down from buildings, leaving the block of the shooting, West 162d Street off St. Nicholas Avenue, littered with garbage, shattered bottles, vegetables, crates, slats of wood and even car parts." At the time of the demonstrations, police were unable to say "whether Mr. Garcia had pulled the gun on Officer O'Keefe or in some other way menaced the officer."

In the end six days of demonstrations took place, during which protesters "tossed trash cans, bottles and rocks, broke windows, looted and overturned and burned police cars," leading to "139 arrests, one death and 90 injuries, including those suffered by 74 police officers," according to a subsequent report by the New York Times. Fires were set in 14 buildings, and 121 vehicles were damaged. Two months after Mr. Garcia was shot and killed, a Manhattan grand jury voted not to file criminal charges against Officer O'Keefe after forensic evidence proved that both witnesses who claimed O'Keefe executed Garcia could not have seen the shooting from the position they asserted they were standing. In addition, the recording of Officer O'Keefe's radio transmissions for assistance corroborating his description of his life-and-death struggle with Garcia was released to the public. In an unusual move, Manhattan District Attorney Robert Morgenthau published the grand jury report to ease public tension, but declined to criminally charge the two witnesses who touched off the riots with falsely reporting an incident and grand jury perjury by their false claims.

Officer O'Keefe was assigned to the NYPD's 34th Precinct, a station house that became the target, just one month before Garcia's shooting death, of a federal investigation over allegations of police corruption. Reported corruption at the 34th Precinct inspired Mayor David Dinkins to appoint the Mollen Commission to investigate police corruption.

==== Choking of Anthony Baez ====
On December 22, 1994, 29-year-old Nuyorican Anthony Baez was choked to death by police officer Francis X. Livoti in the University Heights section of the Bronx for accidentally hitting a police car with a ball. In 1998, Livoti was convicted of violating Baez's civil rights, and two other officers were convicted of lying on the witness stand at Livoti's trial. His widow later settled with the city for $3 million.

==== Sodomy of Abner Louima ====
On August 9, 1997, NYPD Officer Justin Volpe in Brooklyn sodomized Abner Louima with a broken broom handle in a 70th Precinct bathroom after lying about Abner attacking him, and arresting him. Officer Volpe eventually pleaded guilty and was sentenced to 30 years in federal prison. Other officers were also implicated and convicted on charges stemming from the initial cover-up. Louima subsequently settled with the city for $8.75 million.

==== Shooting of Amadou Diallo ====
On February 4, 1999, four plainclothes NYPD officers: Edward McMellon, Sean Carroll, Kenneth Boss, and Richard Murphy, who assigned to the Street Crime Unit in the Bronx fired 41 gunshots at Amadou Diallo, killing him instantly. Diallo, whom the officers mistook for a since-convicted rapist, was later found to be unarmed. The officers were subsequently acquitted in 2000, but the City of New York and the NYPD later paid out $3,000,000 to Diallo's parents in a civil suit. Following the controversy three years later, the street crime unit was disbanded.

A report from Capital New York reported that 85 IP addresses belonging to the New York Police Department had made changes to Wikipedia pages about people killed by NYPD and pages about NYPD misconduct, including this article and the main article about Amadou Diallo. One of these edits changed the statement "Officer Kenneth Boss had previously been involved in an incident in which an unarmed man was shot, but continued to work as a police officer" to "Officer Kenneth Boss was previously involved in an incident in which an armed man was shot." Two policemen associated with these edits were reported to receive only "minor reprimands".

==== Racist mailings of Thomas Pappas ====
Thomas Pappas was a New York City police officer who mailed offensive racist materials from his home. Pappas was employed by NYPD from January 1982 until his termination in August 1999. On at least two occasions in 1996 and 1997, Pappas received letters from the Mineola Auxiliary Police Department asking for donations with seven reply envelopes enclosed for mailing those donations back. Pappas used those reply envelopes by filling them with racially bigoted materials and mailed them back anonymously. When he was fired, Pappas sued to regain his position, arguing that his termination was in violation of his rights of free speech. In 2001, the federal appeals courts sided with NYPD's decision to fire him.

=== 2000s ===
==== Shooting of Patrick Dorismond ====
On March 16, 2000, Dorismond was approached by undercover officer Anthony Vasquez, who asked Dorismond how he and his partners could buy marijuana in an attempt to entrap him. Dorismond was outraged by the question, responded by punching Officer Vasquez, and a fight ensued. During this fight, Vasquez's backup officer moved in and claimed to have mistaken an action by Dorismond as reaching for a weapon and warned Vasquez, who drew his own firearm and shot the unarmed Dorismond to death. Much of the resulting controversy was about releasing Dorismond's sealed juvenile record to the media, claiming a person's right to privacy no longer existed once such persons die. Vasquez was never indicted by a grand jury for Dorismond's death, but his family later settled with the city for $2.25 million.

==== Shooting of Ousmane Zongo ====
On May 22, 2003, 43-year-old Ousmane Zongo, an immigrant from Burkina Faso, was shot four times by Police Officer Bryan Conroy in a Chelsea warehouse. In 2005, Conroy was found guilty of criminally negligent homicide and sentenced to five years' probation. In 2006, the city awarded the Zongo family $3 million to settle a wrongful death suit.

==== Shooting of Timothy Stansbury ====
On January 24, 2004, Housing Bureau officer Richard Neri Jr. accidentally fatally shot Timothy Stansbury, a 19-year-old man who was trespassing on the roof landing of a Bedford-Stuyvesant housing project. Stansbury was unarmed, but had apparently startled Neri by opening the roof door and suddenly encountering the officer. At that point, Neri discharged his service firearm and mortally wounded Stansbury. Although Commissioner Kelly stated that the shooting appeared "unjustified", a Brooklyn jury found that no criminal act had occurred and that the event was a tragic accident. Neri was thus cleared of all charges. The city later agreed to pay $2 million to settle a lawsuit filed by the Stansbury family. A grand jury declined to indict Neri, but Kelly later suspended him for 30 days without pay and permanently stripped him of his weapon.

==== Shooting of Sean Bell ====
On November 25, 2006, plainclothes police officers shot and killed Sean Bell on his wedding day and wounded two of his companions, one critically, outside of the Kalua Cabaret in Queens. No weapon was recovered. According to the police, Bell had rammed his vehicle into an undercover officer and hit an unmarked NYPD minivan twice, prompting undercover officers to fire 50 rounds into Bell's car. Witness accounts of the event conflict with the account provided by the police. A bullet piercing the nearby AirTrain JFK facility startled two Port Authority patrolmen stationed there. An undercover officer claims he heard one of the unarmed man's companions threaten to get his gun to settle a fight with another individual. On April 25, 2008, Justice Arthur Cooperman cleared Detectives Michael Oliver and Gescard Isnora of murder charges, and Detective Marc Cooper of reckless endangerment, in the death of Sean Bell. The city eventually settled with Bell's family for $3.25 million.

==== Subway sodomy scandal ====
On October 15, 2008, five officers attempted to arrest Michael Mineo for smoking marijuana in a Brooklyn subway station. Days later, Mineo made accusations claiming he was sodomized with a police radio antenna by the officers. On December 9, 2008, the Brooklyn District Attorney announced that three of the officers, Richard Kern, Alex Cruz, and Andrew Morales, were indicted on criminal charges. According to the District Attorney, Officer Kern sodomized Mineo with his expandable baton after the officers handcuffed him. Officer Kern was charged with aggravated sexual abuse and assault, and faced up to 25 years in prison; and Officer Cruz and Morales were charged with hindering prosecution and official misconduct, and faced up to 4 years in prison. All three officers were acquitted of all charges.

==== Kidnapping of drug dealers ====
In 2008, NYPD transit officer Jorge Arbaje-Diaz kidnapped, robbed, and tortured drug dealers while on the force in 2008. On June 7, 2011, was sentenced to 20 years in federal prison after being convicted of kidnapping, robbery, and torture, and also was found guilty of stealing more than 1,600 pounds (730 kg) of cocaine and $4 million in cash.

=== 2010s ===
==== Retaliation against ex-officer Adrian Schoolcraft ====
In May 2010, Adrian Schoolcraft, a former NYPD officer, publicized recordings he made in secret while on duty, showing a pattern of corruption and retaliation against him for refusing to cooperate. Officers detained citizens without charges to meet quota and failed to report serious crimes, including rape, to make their department appear to be reducing crime rates. When the NYPD learned that Schoolcraft was privately investigating such corruption, concern for his mental health was used as an excuse for armed officers to kidnap and imprison him in a hospital. In 2010, he was suspended without pay and was filing suit against the NYPD. In further retaliation, lawyers for the city of New York, on behalf of the NYPD, served a subpoena on Graham Rayman, the journalist who reported about Schoolcraft's secret recordings, attempting to abridge the journalist's First Amendment rights by accessing Rayman's records. The city's subpoena to Rayman was seen as a way for the NYPD to gain access to Schoolcraft's tapes. The requests in the subpoena "were made without particularity and essentially seek widespread access to all of Rayman's files." However, a federal judge ruled that the city of New York could only access limited materials. In September 2015, the portion of the lawsuit against the NYPD settled, with Schoolcraft to receive $600,000 in compensation. The portion against Jamaica Hospital was settled in November 2015.

==== Asthma death incident ====
In August 2010, 11-year-old Briana Ojeda died from an asthma attack after NYPD officer Alfonso Mendez denied her mother's pleas to perform cardiopulmonary resuscitation. Ojeda's mother allegedly was driving her daughter to the hospital when she took a wrong one-way turn on a neighborhood street and stopped to ask Officer Alfonso Mendez for help. Ojeda's mother claimed Mendez smirked at her and said, "I don't know CPR," and tried to ticket her. A bystander performed CPR, and by the time an ambulance arrived, Mendez had left. After a one-week manhunt, Mendez was identified and was suspended without pay indefinitely.

"Indeed, it is tragic that Ms. Torres felt a sense of relief when she initially encountered Officer Mendez because she believed a uniformed officer of the law could help her," Judge Jiminez-Salta wrote. "However, there is no policy in the New York Police Department which requires officers to know and to be willing and able to perform CPR."

The incident led to the passing of Briana's Law in New York.

==== Arrest of Michael Premo ====
Occupy Wall Street activist Michael Premo was arrested on December 17, 2011, and charged with assaulting an officer. Prosecutors argued, and the arresting officer gave sworn testimony that Premo "charged the police like a linebacker, taking out a lieutenant and resisting arrest so forcefully that he fractured an officer's bone."

The defense located a video that was taken by freelancer Jon Gerberg, which contradicted the sworn testimony, instead showing officers "tackling [Premo] as he attempted to get back on his feet". Prosecutors claimed no video of Premo's arrest existed, yet the Gerberg video clearly showed an NYPD officer also filming Premo's arrest. Nick Pinto of Village Voice wrote that "information provided by the NYPD in the trial was fabricated to such a degree that the allegations made by the police officers have turned out to be quite literally the opposite of what actually happened.

In March 2013, Premo was acquitted of all charges.

==== Shooting of Ramarley Graham ====
On February 2, 2012, 18-year-old Ramarley Graham was chased into his Bronx home by a unit of plainclothes NYPD officers. Once inside, Graham struggled with one of the police officers near the entrance to a bathroom. Graham was shot once in the chest by a police officer, and Graham was eventually transported to Montefiore Medical Center, where he was pronounced dead. According to a police spokesperson, there was "no evidence" that Graham was armed. Initial statements did not explain what prompted the chase. Initially, police would not identify the officer who fired the fatal shot, but police said that a small amount of marijuana was found in the toilet. The shooting officer was later identified as Richard Haste, and first- and second-degree manslaughter charges were filed against him, to which Haste pleaded not guilty at his arraignment four months after the shooting. After the arraignment hearing, the Bronx District Attorney said that the shooting was unjustified, since Graham had no weapon. In the time between the shooting and the arraignment, the Graham family demanded justice. "The shooting of Mr. Graham has become a flash point in the roiling debate over police aggression; his family has taken part in several vigils and rallies to press for criminal charges in the case, as well as highlight what some critics say is a bias shown by the police against young men of color," The New York Times reported.

After a judge threw out the manslaughter charges against Haste due to a technicality in the proceedings of the first grand jury, a second grand jury voted not to file charges against Haste, leading the Graham family to demand a federal investigation into the unjustified police shooting.

A lawsuit filed against the city was settled for $3.9 million in 2015.

==== Death of Kyam Livingston ====
On July 21, 2013, 37-year-old Kyam Livingston died in NYPD custody after being arrested by officers of Brooklyn's 70th Precinct on charges of violating an order of protection. Upon arrest, Livingston was brought to Kings County Hospital for alcohol and drug testing, but was released in a few hours. She was then processed at the precinct and brought to Brooklyn Central Booking to await arraignment. After approximately 13 hours in custody, Livingston experienced stomach pain and diarrhea and began to repeatedly request medical assistance over the course of seven more hours. According to witnesses, NYPD officers on duty refused to issue Livingston any medical attention, stating that she was an "alcoholic" and threatening to "lose the paperwork" of Livingston and other women in the cell who were pleading for someone to come to her aid. It was further reported that Livingston was dead for at least 20 minutes before emergency medical staff arrived.

Beginning in August 2013, there were repeated demonstrations in Brooklyn demanding the names of the officers on duty at the time of Livingston's death, the release of video surveillance tapes from the cell Livingston was detained in, and the full investigation and improvement of conditions at Brooklyn Central Booking jail. Livingston's family filed a Notice of Claim against the NYPD and other government entities as a prerequisite to an $11 million lawsuit, and called for the criminal prosecution of any police officer who denied medical attention to Livingston while she was in their custody. The NYPD Internal Affairs Division's investigation of the matter is ongoing.

==== Beating of Alexian Lien ====
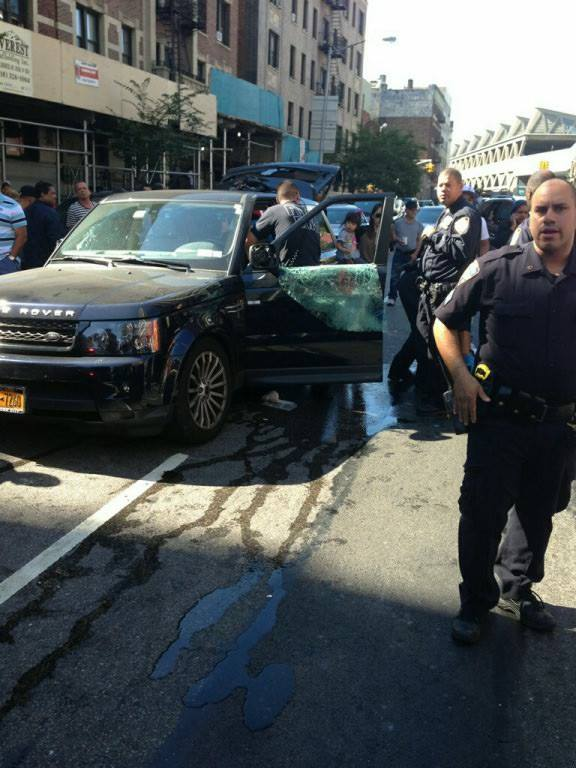
Aftermath showing broken window of Lien's Range Rover

On September 29, 2013, motorcyclists participated in a rally called "Hollywood's Block Party" on New York City's Henry Hudson Parkway. One of the bikers pulled in front of Alexian Lien and slowed dramatically, an action sometimes referred to as "brake checking". Lien stopped his vehicle and was quickly surrounded by bikers. Lien accelerated to escape and struck one of the bikers, critically injuring him. A chase ensued, ending in Lien being pulled from his vehicle and beaten. The attack was caught on video and garnered international attention. A number of bikers are facing assault and other criminal charges, and legislation has been proposed to regulate motorcycle rallies in New York City.

The NYPD faced criticism when some of the bikers involved in the chase and attack were identified as off-duty New York City police officers. Ten-year veteran and undercover detective Wojciech Braszczok surrendered to authorities and was arrested on October 8. An undercover narcotics detective has been identified by the press as being present but not participating in the assault. Sources have reported that a total of five off-duty officers were originally present on the West Side Highway, and that at least two saw the assault.

==== Chokehold of Eric Garner ====
On July 17, 2014, at 4:45 p.m., Eric Garner was approached by NYPD plainclothes police officer Justin Damico, in front of a beauty supply store at 202 Bay Street in the Tompkinsville neighborhood in Staten Island. After telling Damico and other NYPD officers, "I was just minding my own business. Every time you see me, you want to mess with me. I'm tired of it. It stops today!", Garner raised both arms but was then put into a chokehold from behind by officer Daniel Pantaleo, to be subdued. While Garner repeatedly stated that he was not able to breathe, Pantaleo and other officers struggled to bring him down onto the sidewalk and have him put his arms behind his back. He died a few minutes later. The police waited seven minutes before giving Garner cardiopulmonary resuscitation. Use of the chokehold has been prohibited by New York City Police Department policy since 1993. The NYPD later arrested Ramsey Orta, who is the civilian who recorded the video of the encounter. The final autopsy report in Garner's death showed that he neither had drugs nor alcohol in his system, nor did he sustain head trauma. The autopsy suggested that his combative arrest, combined with his obesity and other health problems, may have caused his fatal heart attack. As a result of Garner's death, Police Commissioner William Bratton ordered an extensive review of the NYPD's training procedures, specifically focusing on the appropriate amount of force that can be used while detaining a suspect.

==== Arrest of Ramsey Orta ====
On October 5, 2016, Ramsey Orta, who filmed Eric Garner's murder, was targeted by the NYPD and arrested for weapons and drug charges. Orta filed one lawsuit, alleging that the NYPD had arrested him several times in retaliation for filming the Garner video. But in July 2016, Orta, saying he was "tired of fighting," pled guilty to charges of selling heroin and other drugs to an undercover police officer, and to a charge of possessing an illegal handgun.

==== Shooting of Akai Gurley ====
On November 20, 2014, NYPD Officer Peter Liang fired his pistol. The bullet hit the wall and ricocheted, hitting an unarmed 28-year-old Akai Gurley at a Brooklyn housing project. Commissioner Bratton stated that Liang had already drawn his weapon before encountering Gurley, but initially deemed the shooting an accidental discharge after an investigation. In 2015, Liang was suspended without pay and charged with manslaughter, negligent homicide, assault, reckless endangerment, and official misconduct. On February 11, 2016, Liang was convicted of manslaughter and official misconduct; he was fired by the NYPD the same day.

=== 2020s ===
==== Controversy surrounding Francisco Garcia ====
On May 3, 2020, a video went viral of an NYPD officer repeatedly punching and tasering a man he was arresting for violating the city's temporary social distancing requirement. Despite the fact that the person he was arresting, Donni Wright, was also shown to be resisting arrest and assaulting him, it was later revealed that the officer involved, Francisco Garcia, had a previous history of alleged brutality, resulting in seven lawsuits which were settled by the city for a total of $210,000. One notable incident included a controversial confrontation with a lesbian couple at a Harlem restaurant in 2016, where he allegedly shoved one of the two women and afterwards said "Take a picture of it, fucking dyke.” Another incident occurred in 2014, when he and other NYPD officers controversially arrested a home health care aide for trespassing. However, it soon revealed that the health care aide, whose thick African accent made it hard for Garcia and the assisting officers to understand what he was saying, merely went into the wrong apartment and charges were dropped when it was proven that his patient lived in the same building. Following the May 2020 incident, Garcia was not fired, but stripped of his gun, shield and badge and reassigned to desk duty.

==== Shooting of Jamie Liang ====
In October 2021, off-duty police officer Yvonne Wu broke into the home of her ex-girlfriend, Jenny Li, shooting her and her partner, Jamie Liang, with an NYPD-issued Glock-19 pistol, killing Liang and injuring Li. Wu was suspended without pay and charged with murder.

==== Shooting of Win Rozario ====
In March 2024, Rozario's parents called the police because their son was going through a mental health crisis inside their Ozone Park residence. When NYPD officers Matthew Cianfrocco and Salvatore Alongi arrived, Rozario picked up a pair of scissors in his hand, whereupon officers tased him, then shot him at least five times. Advocates for Rozario's family asked the NYPD to discipline Cianfrocco and Alongi. The CCRB substantiated misconduct charges against the officers in September 2025, ruling that Alongi and Cianfrocco had each committed abuse of authority and misuse of force in the incident. The New York State Attorney General in December 2025 announced that it would not bring criminal charges against Alongi and Cianfrocco. In 2026, Alongi retired; the NYPD was required to notify the CCRB in advance of that retirement, so the CCRB could expedite a disciplinary trial, but did not fulfill that requirement. As he is no longer a member of the NYPD, Alongi will not face a disciplinary trial. Commissioner Tisch apologized for not notifying the CCRB; the NYPD said that it had reassigned and demoted the civilian employee who had failed to make that notification. Cianfrocco has been charged by CCRB but not disciplined by NYPD; the CCRB has stated that Cianfrocco's trial is still planned, but no trial date is yet set.

==== Shooting of Jabez Chakraborty ====
In December 2025, Jabez Chakraborty's family called the non-emergency 988 number to seek psychiatric help for their son, who has schizophrenia and who had attempted to die by suicide. The NYPD mobile crisis team arrived two days later at their home in Jamaica, Queens and left without transporting Jabez to a facility. In January 2026, when he had a psychotic break, the family called 911 to request an ambulance to perform an "involuntary transfer" to a hospital. NYPD officers arrived at the residence, preceding the ambulance. Chakraborty, who was seated calmly when the police arrived, picked up a knife and came toward the officers. Officer Tyree White then shot Chakraborty four times, within 37 seconds of entering the home. While Chakraborty was recovering from the shooting as a patient in Jamaica Hospital, Queens District Attorney Melinda Katz charged Chakraborty with attempted assault in the first degree and with weapon possession; Chakraborty was shackled to his hospital bed. Mayor Zohran Mamdani visited Chakraborty in his hospital room and opposed the Queens DA pressing charges against Chakraborty. The incident, along with the killing of Rozario in 2024, has discouraged Bangladeshi-American families in Queens from calling 911 for help.

== Protest controversies ==
=== Handschu court case ===
A 1970s trial of 21 members of the Black Panther Party revealed that NYPD infiltrated and kept dossiers on not only the Black Panthers and other radical groups, but also on anti-war groups, gay rights activists, educational reform advocates, religious groups, and civic organizations. A large coalition of activist groups accused police of compiling information to punish and repress lawful dissent. Barbara Handschu was a lead plaintiff in the 1971 class action suit Handschu v. Special Services Division, 605 F.Supp. 1384, affirmed 787 F.2d 828. In the 1985 ruling, the court sided with Handschu, finding that police surveillance of political activity violated constitutional protections of free speech. The ruling brought about the agreement.

Despite restrictions set by the Handschu agreement against police surveillance of peaceful citizen activities, like political organizing, law enforcement officials in New York have been able to weaken or violate the restrictions to carry out surveillance of the 2004 Republican National Convention protesters, the Muslim community, Occupy Wall Street activists, and Black Lives Matter activists in New York.

=== 1988 Tompkins Square Park Riot ===
In August 1988, a riot erupted in Alphabet City's Tompkins Square Park in the East Village of Manhattan when police attempted to enforce a newly passed curfew for the park. Bystanders, artists, residents, homeless people, and political activists clashed with police on the night of August 6 and the early morning of the following day. In a report released by Commissioner Benjamin Ward, the police department's actions were "not well planned, staffed, supervised or executed... which culminated in a riot."

=== Matthew Shepard memorial march ===
When the LGBTQ community in New York City organized a memorial march, one week after Matthew Shepard died of injuries sustained during an attack, the NYPD responded in riot gear and on horseback, arresting 96 people and using some violent tactics, triggering at least one federal, constitutional rights violations lawsuit.

=== 2002 World Economic Forum ===
When activists peacefully demonstrated against the World Economic Forum in 2002, the NYPD responded by erecting pens for protesters, wearing riot gear and gas masks, and making what were described as either selective arrests or wholesale arrests based on charges of unlawful assembly and disorderly conduct.

=== Anti-war protests ===
Activists in New York City participated in a global day of protests against the impending U.S. invasion of Iraq. In court, the NYPD opposed efforts by activists to organize a march, convincing a judge that activists should only hold a stationary demonstration. The day of the demonstration, police used horse-mounted officers, who charged at protesters, injuring some activists; used barricades to restrict protesters' access to the demonstration site and to trap activists during the demonstration; conducted widespread searches without a warrant; and detained some activists for many hours in vans without access to bathrooms or food.

=== 2004 Republican National Convention ===
During the 2004 Republican National Convention, many peaceful protesters were arrested at Madison Square Garden, where the convention was held. Over the course of several days, mass arrests by the NYPD netted over 400 people. The use of flexible, plastic orange netting to "divide and conquer protestors," including pedestrians, according to The New York Times. Mayor Michael Bloomberg told The New York Times that if the NYPD engaged in the false arrests of activists, then there was a way to deal with the false arrests after the fact. "You can't arrest 1,800 people without having somebody in the middle who shouldn't have been arrested," Mayor Bloomberg said of the number of arrests made during the 2004 Republican National Convention, adding, "That's what the courts are there to find out afterwards."

Among other actions causing controversy toward the NYPD, a thousand people were detained under conditions, including overcrowding, dirtiness, and contamination of oil and asbestos, described as unfit for detention. People also reported having suffered from smell, bad ventilation, and chemical burns and rashes The New York Times has also reported on two occasions that the police videotaped, infiltrated, and acted as agents provocateurs during the protests, and that officers traveled as far away as Europe beforehand to surveil on people there who planned to protest at the RNC.

The NYPD procured and has deployed Long Range Acoustic Device (LRAD), also known as a sound cannon, as a non-lethal, crowd-controlling military weapon that can cause injury and is intended to disrupt protests. Two LRAD units were purchased in 2004 at a cost of $35,000. An LRAD was at protests of the 2004 Republican National Convention in New York City but not used.

=== Occupy Wall Street protests ===
During the Occupy Wall Street protests in 2011, 700 were arrested, leading to controversy over the NYPD's policing tactics.

=== Black Lives Matter protests ===
==== 2014 protests ====
In 2014, large-scale protests took place in New York City following the deaths of Eric Garner in Staten Island, Michael Brown in Ferguson, Missouri, and Akai Gurley in Brooklyn. The protests increased after grand juries in Ferguson and Staten Island separately decided not to file criminal charges against the police officers, who were involved in the chokehold death of Garner and the shooting death of Brown, respectively. In response to these protests, the NYPD made large numbers of arrests and deployed the uses of pepper spray and mobile LRADs to disrupt activists, long regarded by many as controversial. Use of LRADs by the NYPD triggered legal objections on the basis that there may have never been "formal guidelines for the devices' use".

Political pressure to address fatal interactions with the NYPD escalated after the Daily News reported statistics that showed that, in the time between the 1999 slaying of Amadou Diallo and the 2014 shooting death of Akai Gurley, on-duty NYPD officers were involved in 179 fatalities.

==== 2020 protests ====
The George Floyd protests in New York City, a series of wide-scale protests, occurred after the May 2020 police murder of George Floyd in Minneapolis. There were numerous instances of police-involved excessive force, and as of June 9, 2020, prosecutors were considering charges against up to 40 officers related to their actions during the protests.

On May 29, an NYPD officer shoved a 20-year-old woman to the ground at a protest near Barclays Center in Brooklyn, resulting in a concussion and seizures. A video of the incidents depicts the officer calling the woman a "bitch" after she asked about his order to get out of the street. The officer was later suspended without pay, and later became the first officer to be charged for actions taken during the protests.

A video of a crowd of protesters clashing with the NYPD attracted attention on May 30, showing police vehicles accelerating into a crowd of people. In response to the video, de Blasio initially defended the officers' actions, but later reneged on these comments. The Guardian wrote that the video, viewed more than 30 million times as of June 4, "quickly shredded years of effort to repair the deeply tarnished image of the NYPD."

On May 30, a video of an incident at a Brooklyn protest circulated on social media, depicting a black protester wearing a mask with his hands up, approached by a police officer who pulls the protester's mask off to pepper-spray his face. After an investigation, the officer involved was suspended without pay and referred to an internal disciplinary process.

In September 2020, Human Rights Watch published a 99-page report documenting a coordinated attempt by NYPD officers to "kettle", assault, and mass arrest peaceful protestors in the Mott Haven neighborhood of the South Bronx on June 4, 2020.

Those arrested at the beginning of the 2020 protests in numerous locations in the city are entitled to receive settlements as part of the class action lawsuit Sow v. City of New York.

== Misconduct involving multiple victims and other controversies ==
=== Corruption in 77th Precinct ===
In December 1986, 11 NYPD officers were arrested from the 77th Precinct station house in the first major instance of corruption after the Knapp Commission. The investigation came to be known as the "Buddy Boys" case. The officers, "who knocked down doors, stole money and drugs from drug dealers and resold the stolen drugs," also "ran extortion operations within the precinct," according to a corruption timeline prepared by The New York Times. Eventually, 13 officers were indicted, and all of the nearly 200 officers at the 77th Precinct station house had to be transferred to other Brooklyn precincts, except for 1 union delegate. A special state prosecutor, Charles Hynes, presented the evidence to a special grand jury in the corruption investigation.

=== Central Park jogger case ===
In 1989, five black and one Latino boys, 14 to 16 years old, were coerced by NYPD officers into falsely confessing to a woman's Central Park assault and rape. The police allegedly threatened and slapped one of the suspects. The six males were vindicated in 2002, five of whom equally shared a $40 million 2014 lawsuit settlement.

=== 75th Precinct cocaine ring scandal ===
In May 1992, five current and one retired NYPD officers were arrested and charged with trafficking drugs from Brooklyn into Long Island. Two of the officers were partners at the 75th Precinct, whilst the other officers were from the 73rd Precinct.

Prosecutors alleged that one of the officers arrested, Michael Dowd, knew when he was under surveillance and may have benefited from tips from department investigators. How Dowd may have managed, for some time, to evade investigation became a subject of inquiry by the Mollen Commission. Officer Kenny Eurell, who also was one of the officers arrested at the same time as Dowd, tape-recorded Dowd plotting an elaborate plan to skip bail. His bail was revoked, and later, Dowd was convicted of racketeering and conspiracy to distribute narcotics and served 12 years in prison.

In 2014, a documentary was released, The Seven Five, detailing Michael Dowd's career with the NYPD.

=== Corruption in 34th Precinct ===
Federal investigators launched a probe over reports that some police officers were engaged in drug dealing. At the same time, Mayor David Dinkins announced that he would "name a special investigator to look into the charges of corruption, as well as possible lapses in the Police Department's internal investigation methods. Aides to the Mayor said the investigator would be Milton Mollen, the former Deputy Mayor for Public Safety," according to a report published by The New York Times, adding that the investigation by the U.S. Attorney's Office was focusing on the 34th Precinct, further noting that "The investigation is an unusual Federal intrusion into the workings of the city's Police Department and it raises the specter of a departmental problem larger than that acknowledged by Police Department officials." Amongst aspects or allegations triggering investigatory scrutiny was that the 34th Precinct had the highest rate of homicides and that some 34th Precinct police officers were "overlooking drug dealing in exchange for money and drugs and acting as guardians for the dealers by protecting the buildings and stores where they live and work. Other officers are suspected of buying and selling cocaine or crack."

Top NYPD officials stated that the Brooklyn cocaine ring and the 34th Precinct corruption allegations were isolated incidents, despite complaints of other wrongdoings. Some complaints noted that officers with the NYPD's Internal Affairs mishandled investigations. In 1994, the 34th Precinct had the highest number of corruption complaints, according to statistics reported by the New York Daily News. The three-year federal investigation of the 34th Precinct ended with only one conviction of perjury.

=== Police riot ===
In 1992, an estimated 10,000 off-duty NYPD officers showed up to a rally outside City Hall organized by the Patrolmen's Benevolent Association. The off-duty police officers were called to action by the police union over disapproval with actions taken by the then-mayor, David Dinkins. Police were protesting, amongst other complaints, that Dinkins had appointed the Mollen Commission to investigate NYPD corruption. To show their disapproval with the Dinkins administration, the officers began the rally with rhetoric that was described as "vicious," with officers engaging in jarring behavior, including "jumping barricades, tramping on automobiles, mobbing the steps of City Hall" and "blocking traffic on the Brooklyn Bridge for nearly an hour in the most unruly and angry police demonstration in recent memory," according to an account of the rally published by The New York Times. There were instances when some of the 300 uniformed police officers, who were supposed to police the rally, actually encouraged raucous behavior by the protesters. Dinkins blamed PBA leadership, as well as then presumed mayoral candidate Rudolph Giuliani, for inciting the police into rowdy actions, calling the actions by police "bordering on hooliganism."

The Editorial Board of The New York Times called the police rally a "riot," finding both praise and fault in a preliminary report by the NYPD of the police misconduct. The report found that police officers used racial slurs to describe Dinkins, who is black, and that there had been drinking in connection with the rally. Generally, the report was well received by the Editorial Board for its frankness, but, in the editors' nuanced view of the report, the report still fell short, because the report was "thick with language critical of the unruly behavior but apparently thin on charges against individual rioters," again pointing out that the NYPD was unable to keep the conduct of its own officers in check. Then Acting NYPD Commissioner Raymond Kelly himself "raised serious questions about the Department's willingness and ability to police itself," according to The New York Times.

=== Corruption in 109th Precinct ===
After the NYPD received complaints that police officers assigned to the 109th Precinct were using drugs, four officers were confronted. Three officers took drug tests, failed, and were dismissed. One officer resigned.

The investigation of the precinct extended to at least 20 police officers, including a sergeant. Some officers were given desk jobs or transferred to other precincts. Three officers from the precinct were indicted for theft. In its report about the investigations at the 109th Precinct, The New York Times noted that although the allegations were not as severe as those at the 30th Precinct, the investigation was notable, "because it demonstrates that major corruption exists in precincts outside the high-crime areas where the temptations for drug-related corruption are usually highest."

In the face of allegations that a police union, the Patrolmen's Benevolent Association, was undertaking "aggressive efforts to thwart major corruption inquiries," according to The New York Times, John Miller, then the Deputy Police Commissioner for Public Information, said he found the actions "disturbing." Efforts to root out bad cops were made difficult by the P.B.A., as that police union is known, according to officials and prosecutors, who worried "that they will have trouble rooting out substantial numbers of corrupt officers as long as the P.B.A. resists them," as reported by The New York Times. Indeed, the P.B.A. was shown to be a powerful organization with great influence. "Fortified with millions of dollars in annual dues collections, the P.B.A. is one of the most powerful unions in the city. As an active lobbyist in Albany and as a contributor to political campaigns, the P.B.A. has enormous influence over the department and is typically brought in for consultations before important management decisions are made."

=== Corruption in 73rd Precinct ===
In January 1994, five NYPD officers assigned to the 73rd Precinct station house were removed from duty over allegations of extorting cash, guns, and drugs from drug dealers. The investigation referred to the group of implicated police officers by the moniker, the "Morgue Boys," because the officers would sometimes retreat near an abandoned coffin factory, where they would divide the proceeds of their criminality. Federal and state investigators worked in partnership to collect evidence for a federal grand jury, which included information that the implicated police officers would hold up drug dealers at gunpoint, usually while on duty, netting up to $2,000 per night in criminal proceeds. The investigation into corruption at the 73rd Precinct was made possible by information gathered at hearings held by the Mollen Commission.

Eventually, 15 police officers were suspected of having participated in the "Morgue Boys" ring, resulting in at least six arrests, three of which pleaded guilty, with the remaining three receiving either acquittals or mistrials by trial jurors with respect to criminal and civil rights charges, respectively.

=== Corruption in 30th Precinct ===
Thirty-three officers were arrested in a wide-ranging investigation of corruption at the 30th Precinct station house in Harlem. Some of the police officers would illegally search known drug dealers' apartments, seizing drugs and cash. The police officers would then sell the seized drugs straight out of the 30th Precinct station house itself at half-market price to profit from their spoils.

The arrests, which implicated nearly one out of six officers assigned to the 30th Precinct station house, were the fruits of a probe began by an investigator, who worked for the Mollen Commission.

=== Corruption in 48th Precinct ===
Sixteen police officers from the 48th Precinct station house in The Bronx were indicted and arrested on corruption charges, including larceny, filing false police reports, and insurance fraud. Seven further officers faced disciplinary action, but not arrests, because there was insufficient evidence to lead to indictments. In total, nearly 10 percent of the police officers assigned to the 48th Precinct house were implicated in a corruption investigation that was inspired by pressure created by the Mollen Commission. Reports also showed that a police union, the Patrolmen's Benevolent Association, undertook aggressive efforts to thwart investigations into corruption at the 48th Precinct.

=== Flushing brothel evidence-planting ===
Dennis Kim and Jerry Svoronos, two police officers working out of the 109th Precinct, and Gina Kim and Geeho Chae, brothel operators, were arrested on March 8, 2006, for bribery charges relating to the protection of a brothel located in Flushing, Queens. Agents seized approximately $800,000 in cash, believed to be the proceeds of the brothel, from Kim and Chae's vehicle and residence. On March 8, 2006, search warrants were executed at the brothel and a boarding house used by the brothel workers, where agents seized immigration documents, business records, and a small quantity of Ecstasy. The two officers were in a unit that targets quality-of-life-type crimes. Members of the precincts engaged in a practice known as "flaking", in which cops planted marijuana, cocaine, or Ecstasy on suspects. Members of the conditions unit maintained a small stash of drugs in an Altoids tin for this purpose, Assistant U.S. Attorney Monica Ryan said. In addition, 16 Chinese and Korean brothel workers were taken into immigration custody.

=== Mafia cops ===
Louis Eppolito and Stephen Caracappa were simultaneously on the payrolls of the NYPD and the Lucchese crime family and were abusing their authority as officers of the NYPD. They would routinely violate the civil rights of the citizens of New York City and moonlighted for the crime family. They would use NYPD files to track down the enemies of the crime family and were ultimately convicted of the murders of Eddie Lino, Michael Greenwald (an informant for the FBI), and innocent man Nick Guido, who had the same name as a man targeted by the crime family. Indicted in 2005, Eppolito received life in prison with an additional 100 years, and Caracappa received life in prison with an additional 80 years. They were also fined a combined $4 million. They received a monthly salary of $5,000 from the crime family.

=== NYPD "rape cops" scandals ===
In December 2008, two on-duty NYPD officers were charged with raping a woman whom they had been dispatched to help on a 911 call. Officers Kenneth Moreno, age 43, and Franklin Mata, age 29, were called to help a drunken woman out of a taxi and into her apartment in 2008. The woman testified that she awoke in her bedroom to being raped by Moreno; Mata was said to have acted as a lookout during the incident. Although both men were acquitted of the rape at trial in May 2011, the jury's verdict proved highly controversial and drew large protests. Moreno and Mata were, however, found guilty of official misconduct for going back into the woman's apartment three times without alerting their superiors and making erroneous calls to 911 with claims of a nonexistent homeless man loitering in the area to facilitate their return to the premises. As a result of the convictions, both officers were immediately terminated from the NYPD.

In September 2011, an off-duty NYPD officer, Michael Pena, was charged with raping a schoolteacher at gunpoint. According to the woman, she was stopped by Pena, who was allegedly intoxicated, who ordered her into an apartment backyard as he pointed a gun at her face. At Pena's trial, the woman testified that Pena had threatened to kill her if she screamed or looked at him as he began to rape her. An apartment resident heard the woman's pleas for him to stop and called 911. The NYPD was able to confirm that Pena was drunk and armed, but he denied raping her. He was charged with 10 felonies, including predatory assault, sexual assault, and first-degree rape, and pleaded not guilty. On March 27, 2012, Pena was found guilty on the predatory assault and sexual assault charges, but the jury deadlocked on the rape charges. Three months after the trial, Pena pleaded guilty to rape and was sentenced to 75 years to life.

=== Gun smuggling scandal ===
In October 2011, five current NYPD police officers and three retired police officers were arrested and charged with trafficking guns into New York state in exchange for thousands of dollars in cash. Six of those implicated worked, or once worked, at the 68th Precinct.

=== Ticket fixing scandal ===
In October 2011, 16 NYPD police officers were charged with offenses related to ticket fixing whereby they "fixed" tickets issued to family and friends. The head of New York's largest police union defended ticket-fixing by the NYPD, saying it was "long standing practice at all levels of the department." Though only 16 NYPD officers were facing trial, news reports show that hundreds of NYPD police officers were involved, "caught on a phone tap asking for scores of tickets to disappear." A list of officers involved in ticket-fixing, which numbered hundreds, was subsequently used by prosecutors to vet cases that might rest too heavily on officers.

=== "Paid Detail Unit" ===
An October 2011 article by Pam Martens in the CounterPunch newsletter alleged police corruption in reference to the NYPD's "Paid Detail Unit" that allows corporations to hire NYPD police officers for security duties. The Paid Detail Unit was established by Mayor Giuliani in 1998 as a way to increase revenue to New York City that allowed off-duty police officers to moonlight in uniform and as of 2003 nearly half of NYPD's street cops (11,000) were on the Paid Detail Unit. The then commanding officer of the Unit justified the program by claiming cops are off the business payroll the moment they see a crime committed and are expected to respond just as they would if they were on-duty.

=== Muslim surveillance ===
After the September 11 attack, the NYPD and the Central Intelligence Agency, engaged to track certain Muslims in the New York metropolitan area, including Yale University and the University of Pennsylvania. According to Associated Press, "[a] months-long investigation... has revealed that the NYPD operates far outside its borders and targets ethnic communities in ways that would run afoul of civil liberties rules if practiced by the federal government. And it does so with unprecedented help from the CIA in a partnership that has blurred the bright line between foreign and domestic spying."

When the Associated Press published reports on this activity, the NYPD faced much controversy and criticism. Muslims were spied on in mosques, restaurants, streets, public places, and Muslim groups, and websites were scrutinized. It resulted in much confusion and anger from Muslim communities in the United States, as well as support from New York City mayor Michael Bloomberg. The FBI criticized the spying as unhealthy.

The Associated Press won the 2012 Pulitzer Prize for the investigation. Later, in June 2012, Muslims in New Jersey sued the NYPD over the spying. However, the lawsuit was dismissed in February 2014 by a federal judge who said that the surveillance of the Muslim community was a lawful effort to prevent terrorism, not a civil-rights violation. The surveillance program was disbanded on April 15, 2014, after a meeting that was held with several Muslim advocates on April 8, 2014. It was also revealed that the surveillance program failed to generate even a single lead.

=== Falsification of evidence to secure convictions ===
Louis N. Scarcella is a retired NYPD detective who initially came to prominence during the "crack epidemic" of the 1980s–1990s. As a member of the Brooklyn North Homicide Squad, he and his longtime partner Stephen Chmil built a reputation for obtaining convictions in difficult cases. Since 2013, Scarcella has received extensive publicity for multiple allegations of investigative misconduct. As of November 2019, 15 people had their convictions overturned in Scarcella's homicide cases, as the Kings County (Brooklyn) District Attorney's Office continued to review dozens of his investigations. For cases involving at least 8 suspects, the prosecutors or judges have explicitly cited evidence of Scarcella's improper conduct, although the statute of limitations has protected him from legal consequences. As the New York Daily News reported, as of May 2018, Scarcella's homicide cases had resulted in wrongful convictions for at least 13 individuals with a combined 245 years in prison, and the city and state had paid at least $53.3 million in legal settlements because of his "shady investigations involving tainted evidence, misleading testimony or forced confessions".

=== Corruption in the 67th Precinct ===
A pattern of arrests of individuals who were charged with gun possession, made by officers in Brooklyn's 67th Precinct station house, was reported to have allegedly tampered with, according to a 2014 newspaper report. The suspects stated that the police had placed the guns on their persons, and the report said that "each gun was found in a plastic bag or a handkerchief, with no traces of the suspect's fingerprints." Defense attorneys have said in court filings that the arresting officers may have been inventing informers as a way to satisfy arrest quotas and to collect $1,000 rewards from an anti-gun community safety program.

The questions raised about the arrests suggested a "pattern of questionable police conduct and tactics," according to the report. After an inquiry by the newspaper, prosecutors admitted that they were going to review the cases of some of the arrests, leading to gun possession charges being dropped against at least two men. The case against a third man was eventually dismissed at the request of prosecutors, but only after the man's trial preparation had commenced. A fourth man was acquitted at the conclusion of a federal trial after police testimony was found to be "inconsistent." A trial against a fifth man arrested on gun possession charges was dismissed after police could not produce their informant before the judge. Reportedly, an investigation is being conducted by the NYPD's Internal Affairs Bureau.

=== "Turned backs" at Liu's and Ramos' hospital arrivals and funerals ===
On December 20, 2014, many NYPD officers turned their backs on Mayor Bill de Blasio when patrol officers Rafael Ramos and Wenjian Liu arrived at Brooklyn's Woodhull Hospital where they were pronounced dead on arrival hours later, in protest at words de Blasio reportedly spoken to his son that characterized them in a negative light, as well as at the officers' funerals themselves, Ramos' on December 27 and Liu's on January 4, 2015. Enforcement of laws had been dramatically lowered in the weeks following the funeral. The events at the funerals were politicized, with many conservative commentators siding with the NYPD and many liberals siding with protesters against the NYPD. Some blamed the local police union, the Patrolmen's Benevolent Association, which said that it was not behind the decline in arrests.

=== NYPD edits to English Wikipedia articles ===
On March 13, 2015, many news organizations reported that 50 of the 15,000 IP addresses belonging to the NYPD were associated with edits to articles on the English Wikipedia that dated back to 2006. These IP addresses geolocate to the NYPD headquarters at 1 Police Plaza. According to one news source, English Wikipedia discourages editors from making revisions that might constitute a conflict of interest. An internal review found two officers had used police-owned equipment to make edits to English Wikipedia. Of the English Wikipedia edits, Commissioner Bill Bratton said, "I don't anticipate any punishment to be quite frank with you." Bratton said the NYPD does not have "a policy specific to accessing that site," but will review its social media policy. In 2020, it was reported that the NYPD continued to edit its pages on Wikipedia, although edits were quickly reversed.

=== Arrest quota "game" ===
In 2015, officers went public with accusations that the command of the Anti-Crime Unit in the 122nd Precinct station house in Staten Island awarded points to unit officers for every misdemeanor and felony arrest the officers made. If unit officers failed to earn a minimum number of points per month, then the unit officers faced the possibility of being transferred out of the unit. Officers who made the allegations said that the point system amounted to a game to reinforce a quota system of arrests, a charge that an NYPD spokesperson denied. The allegations were revealed against a backdrop of a lawsuit filed by nearly a dozen minority NYPD officers, who claimed that the NYPD retaliated against them for refusing to meet a quota for issuing summonses in minority communities.

=== Rant against Uber driver ===
On March 30, 2015, an Uber driver was "pulled over" by Detective Patrick Cherry a 15-year veteran of the NYPD who was assigned to the FBI's Joint Terrorism Task Force in New York City. His xenophobic and profanity-filled tirade and threats of arrest for making a "mild" gesture at the detective for not properly signaling has highlighted what other drivers-for-hire have called a pattern of abuse and discrimination by the New York City police. The encounter came to light, because of a video that a passenger in the car posted to YouTube. Detective Cherry conducted this unlawful detainment in a Hyundai Sonata not officially issued to him, according to NYPD. Furthermore, it had a simple LED blue and red flasher on the dash, a color combination not used by police in the state of New York, raising additional questions if this was a personally-owned car and not one which he had the right to use in traffic stops.

In the ensuing news stories, it came to light that Detective Cherry has been the subject of two federal civil rights lawsuits, both of which the City of New York settled. This detective also has been party to at least 12 citizen complaint review board enquiries. According to NYPD Commissioner William Bratton, Cherry was stripped of his badge, gun, and the right to arrest while the Internal Affairs and CCRB investigations took place. In 2016, the investigation found him "guilty," and he lost 30 vacation days as a penalty.

=== Lawsuits against NYPD officers ===
The New York Daily News revealed that 55 officers had each been sued for misconduct 10 or more times since 2006, resulting in settlements and judgments that totaled over $6 million of the $1 billion paid during the period to cover all civil suit judgments/settlements against the NYPD. Only one to two percent of people who believe they were mistreated by the police actually file lawsuits. Narcotics detective Peter Valentin was sued 28 times for misconduct from 2006 through early 2014, resulting in $884,000 in settlements. The lawsuit allegations included the running of slash-and-burn raids that resulted in few criminal convictions.

=== Corruption in the 40th Precinct ===
In 2015, disciplinary charges were announced against 19 officers at the 40th Precinct station house in the Bronx, after these officers failed to process crime complaints properly. During an audit of four months in 2014, fifty-five instances of alleged discrepancies were discovered between radio call response activities and complaint reports that led to a deliberate misreporting of crimes. After the discrepancies were corrected, it was discovered that crimes actually increased in the precinct from what had been previously reported for 2014.

=== Investigation into cheating on the 2015 lieutenants' exam ===
The NYPD launched an investigation into allegations of widespread cheating by the class of sergeants, who took the lieutenants' exam in 2015. About 200 sergeants passed the test during the original date of its administration, and at a make-up test date for those who missed the original test date. After the initial test date, the answer key to the exam was reportedly posted on an online message board popular with police officers. Nevertheless, allegations were made of cheating on both the initial test and the make-up test. Pending the outcome of the NYPD investigation, the promotion of the roughly 200 sergeants who passed the test was put on hold. The allegations of cheating had triggered a lawsuit by police officers, who claimed that the cheating provided some officers with an unfair advantage.

=== Federal corruption investigation of top NYPD officers ===
NYPD Commissioner William Bratton reassigned four top NYPD officers as a consequence of a federal corruption investigation of the NYPD being led by the U.S. Attorney's Office and the Federal Bureau of Investigation. Deputy Chief Michael Harrington, Deputy Inspector James Grant, Deputy Chief David Colon, and Deputy Chief Eric Rodriguez were each disciplined by being given desk jobs even before the outcome of the investigation was made clear. The investigation of the NYPD was reportedly connected to probes of two businessmen with ties to Mayor Bill de Blasio. Although the complete nature and identity of all of the targets of the federal investigation were not made clear, agents of the FBI's political corruption unit were participating in the probe.

As part of the wide-ranging Federal investigation into alleged misconduct and corruption at the NYPD, federal prosecutors filed criminal charges against Brooklyn public safety patrol volunteer Shaya (Alex) Lichtenstein for attempting to bribe an undercover officer with almost $1 million if the undercover officer would expedite permits for around 150 guns. One prosecutor described Lichtenstein as an "arms dealer." Three NYPD officers, who worked in the Licensing Division, the departmental unit that processed gun permits, were transferred to other posts.

The federal corruption investigation has also reportedly focused on former Chief of Department Philip Banks, who allegedly received gifts from one of the two businessmen with close ties to Mayor de Blasio.

Under anxious conditions, with senior police officers expecting indictments to be handed down as a consequence of the investigation, NYPD Inspector and Michael Ameri reportedly killed himself by shooting himself in the head while he sat in his department-issued car. Ameri had reportedly been interviewed twice by investigators about preferential treatment being given to the two businessmen with ties to Mayor de Blasio, and the unit in which Ameri worked had been raided by officers from the NYPD's Internal Affairs Bureau. Another NYPD officer, who was a close friend of and who worked with Ameri in the Highway Patrol Unit, was reassigned following Ameri's death. Micheal Ameri was also part of the Brooklyn narcotics unit. Him and his partners use to stop and arrest young male teens and men for allegedly possessing small amounts of marijuana so they can bring them to pricinct and get sexually aroused while strip searching the suspects.

Some of the senior NYPD officers, who have been disciplined in connection with the reported investigation, include officers who had received promotions from NYPD Commissioner William Bratton. Allegedly, Commissioner Bratton has been allowing senior NYPD officers implicated in the reported investigation to retire with their pension benefits without facing departmental charges for alleged misconduct. Mayor Bill de Blasio said the process for the top brass retirements was appropriate.

During a radio interview, Sergeants Benevolent Association President Ed Mullins called for Commissioner Bratton to resign, saying new leadership at the police department was needed, and adding, "I personally think Bratton has stayed too long, and it's time to go."

In June 2016, three NYPD commanders were charged by prosecutors with federal corruption charges as part of the reported, wide-ranging investigation. One day after Millions March NYC, a group with ties to the Black Lives Matter movement, commenced a protest in City Hall Park, demanding, among other things, the resignation of Commissioner Bratton, the embattled police commissioner announced he was stepping down from his post.

=== Arrest of Jazmine Headley ===
On December 7, 2018, NYPD officers violently separated a one-year-old boy from his mother, Jazmine Headley, who was at the New York City Human Resources Administration awaiting an appointment for a daycare voucher. A witness reportedly described Headley as "not acting erratically or in any way a risk to her child". Brooklyn city councilman Stephen Levin expressed concern at the officers' apparent violation of their de-escalation training.

=== Food vendor crackdown ===
On November 9, 2019, four police officers confiscated the cart of a churro vendor at the Broadway Junction station in a crackdown on homelessness and "quality of life" issues. A second churro vendor was arrested on Monday November 11 at the Myrtle-Wycoff station. Julie Salazar, the New York State Senator whose district includes the Broadway Junction stop, criticized the officers' actions as "criminalizing" a person who was trying to make a living.

=== 2019 Internal Affairs "integrity test" ===
Officers Joseph Stokes and Jose Aracena were arrested following an October 29, 2019, Internal Affairs "integrity test" on the Lower East Side, after the patrol partners pulled over an undercover officer who feigned drunkenness. Manhattan District Attorney Cyrus Vance Jr. reported the duo as charged with stealing cash from the vehicle, which was caught on camera. Stokes filed a lawsuit, claiming the sting operation was retaliation for his April 29, 2018, arrest of a restaurateur for drunk driving who had claimed close ties to NYPD Commissioner James O'Neill and Chief Jeffrey Maddrey. Stokes claims that the restaurateur had then threatened him, and later claimed that money was stolen from his vehicle.

=== Exclusion of NYPD as court witnesses ===
In February 2020, media reported that Brooklyn, Manhattan, and Staten Island District Attorney Offices each compile lists, or information, into a "Do Not Call" roster of "NYPD officers who they will not allow to testify in court."

=== Marijuana planting ===
On two different occasions in 2018, Officer Kyle Erickson, of the 120th Precinct, was caught on his own bodycam planting marijuana in cars during a traffic stop after finding nothing in a search. Both times, after planting the marijuana, Erickson asked fellow officer Elmer Pastran if they were "good", suggesting that Pastran was fully complicit. The man arrested in the first incident, Lasou Kuyateh, began proceedings in late 2019 to sue the city of New York for $1 million. His marijuana charge had been dropped abruptly at a pretrial hearing because of the video, and prosecutors encouraged Erickson to get a lawyer. A passenger in the second incident, Jason Serrano, was ordered out of the car and ultimately pushed to the ground and handcuffed despite showing officers that he was recovering from an abdominal stab wound, and was taken back to the hospital following the incident. A review by the police department's internal affairs division determined that allegations of misconduct in both incidents were "unfounded", and both officers remain on patrol.

=== Parking placard corruption and bike lane blocking ===
NYPD officers have been repeatedly and consistently documented to engage in illegal parking, and in refusing to give tickets to illegally parked cars which are owned by police or friends of police; either abusing official placards, or using fake placards or pieces of police uniforms. The Twitter account "placardabuse" documented this from 2016 through at least 2020. When confronted on this, the NYPD harassed reporters.

The NYPD has been persistently criticized by safe streets advocates for endangering cyclists by parking their vehicles in bike lanes.

=== Cyclist ticketing ===
The NYPD has been criticized for misapplying the law when ticketing cyclists riding outside blocked bike lanes.

=== Prostitution ===
A 2020 ProPublica report documented abundant allegations of false arrest and sexual misconduct in NYPD prostitution stings. Purported buyers and sellers of sex denied ever having agreed to the transactions when undercover officers propositioned them. Despite possessing equipment to record these transactions, the NYPD chose not to do so in many cases. In 2014, the NYPD paid more than a million in taxpayer dollars to individuals who were falsely arrested. Even though research indicates that most buyers of sex are white, 93% of the 3,000 accused by the NYPD of trying to buy sex from 2016 to 2020 were nonwhite.

=== Racist rants by anti-harassment official ===
In 2021, an investigation by the NYPD found that the head of the NYPD's Equal Employment Opportunity Division had a history of posting racist rants to an online forum frequented by police. For example, he referred to President Barack Obama as a "Muslim savage" and called the black son of Mayor Bill de Blasio a "brillohead." New York City Council's Oversight and Investigations Division pointed these messages out to the NYPD, prompting the investigation.

=== Sutter Avenue station shooting ===
On September 15, 2024, two NYPD officers shot at an allegedly knife-wielding fare evader at the Sutter Avenue station in Brooklyn, striking the suspect, one officer, and two bystanders. The shooting was met with great public outcry. Police originally claimed that the fare-evader, Derell Mickles, charged at police with a knife. However, Mickles was shown on bodycam footage to be standing still with his hands at his sides when police opened fire. After being shot, Mickles was left "in very bad shape" and "unable to walk" while a shot bystander was left in critical condition with permanent brain damage.

== Attempts at reform ==
Starting in the 1890s, approximately every 20 years, a committee has been formed to investigate police corruption in New York City. These committees are listed below.

=== Shootings by police ===
From 1971 to 2016, the shooting and killing of alleged perpetrators dropped from 314 shots and 93 killed to 23 shots and 8 killed. This represents a reduction of more than 90%.

=== Lexow Committee ===
In the 1890s, Presbyterian minister Rev. Charles Parkhurst launched a crusade against vice and corruption, going undercover to saloons and brothels to collect evidence of police corruption. His activism prompted leaders in the state capital to form a committee, headed by State Sen. Clarence Lexow. The Lexow Committee held hearings and issued documents, demonstrating that NYPD officers were on the take. The revelations of corruption led to the election of a reform-minded mayor, William Strong, serving a temporary setback to the corrupt Tammany Hall political machine. To further police reform, Strong appointed Theodore Roosevelt as NYPD commissioner.

=== Curran Committee ===
In 1912, another committee was formed to investigate allegations of NYPD corruption.

=== Hofstadter Committee ===
The Hofstadter Committee, also known as the Seabury investigations, was a joint legislative committee formed by the New York State Legislature to probe police and judicial corruption in New York City in 1931. Prompted by allegations of corruption in police and court systems, the Hofstadter Committee heard testimony from a thousand citizens, policemen, judges, lawyers, and defendants about unjust treatment before the law. Many people, who were charged with crimes in the Magistrate's Court, were innocent of wrongdoing, and the victims were railroaded into paying money through certain attorneys to court personnel, police, and others. The Hofstadter Committee's work resulted in a massive shake-up of the lower court system and the resignation of New York City Mayor Jimmy Walker. New York County Sheriff Thomas M. Farley was removed from office by Gov. Franklin D. Roosevelt. Major changes in the method of arrest, bail and litigation of suspects in New York City were also brought about by the Hofstadter Committee's work.

The pressure for reform, once unleashed, later ensnared State Senator Samuel H. Hofstadter, who chaired the commission, when the executive committee of the Association of the Bar of the City of New York held that State Senator Hofstadter had violated the public trust by having accepted a judicial appointment from Tammany Hall when he was investigating that political organization's "domination of the city government."

=== Helfand Investigation ===
From 1949 to 1950, deputy assistant Brooklyn District Attorney Julius Helfand conducted a probe into allegations that bookmaker Harry Gross's $20 million a year operation was protected by members of the NYPD and city government. The investigation led to the conviction of 10 police officers and the resignation of New York City Police Commissioner William O'Brien.

=== Knapp Commission ===
The Knapp Commission was appointed in 1970 by former New York City Mayor John Lindsay to investigate corruption at the NYPD after whistleblowers Frank Serpico and David Durk made revelations about corruption at the NYPD. The Knapp Commission's chief counsel, Michael F. Armstrong, said at the time that "the department has a serious corruption problem that must be characterized as extensive." The extent of police corruption included allegations that "several policemen invited a New Jersey gambler to set up shop in the Bronx when a bookmaker in that borough went broke, and the policemen lost their source of graft." Investigations by the Knapp Commission showed a pattern of extorting money from criminals, other payoffs, and other corruption.

Before the Knapp Commission could fully begin its work, NYPD Commissioner Howard R. Leary resigned after community leaders questioned his ability to address allegations of systemic corruption at the NYPD. Leary was succeeded as commissioner by Patrick V. Murphy. In 1971, police detective Frank Serpico, Lt. David Durk, and other officers testified before the Knapp Commission about the corruption they witnessed in the department.

The Knapp Commission faulted some of the top city officials at the time, including a top advisor to the mayor, the former City Commissioner of Investigation, and the former First Deputy Police Commissioner, for failing to act "when informed of widespread bribery among plainclothes policemen responsible for enforcing the gambling laws in the Bronx." For example, even after police officer Serpico blew the whistle on police corruption, Mayor Lindsay "did not see to it that the specific charges of corruption" made by officer Serpico "were investigated." The Knapp Commission confirmed that the NYPD's internal affairs division was corrupted, noting how the head of internal affairs was caught in the act of trying to collect information from the files of the detective bureau "at the request of the first deputy commissioner." The Knapp Commission further found that there existed a "reluctance on the part of top-level police personnel to undertake investigations that might have led to exposure of widespread corruption inconsistent with the official line that corruption was limited to a few 'rotten apples.'" The Knapp Commission's findings also faulted the city's Department of Investigation and the District Attorneys offices for their sub par efforts to fight "the widespread corruption which then existed." The commission's findings led to reforms within the department, developed by Commissioner Murphy. Reforms included decentralizing corruption control within Field Investigative Units, which were intended to be closer and more in touch with the streets where the problems were.

=== Mollen Commission ===
Other commissions have investigated the NYPD before and after the Knapp Commission, including 1994's Mollen Commission, which documented widespread police abuse during the late 1980s and early 1990s.

The Mollen Commission was appointed in 1992 by former New York City Mayor David Dinkins to investigate corruption at the NYPD. Before the Mollen Commission could fully begin its work, NYPD Commissioner Lee P. Brown resigned after reportedly disagreeing with Dinkins' decision to form the police investigation commission. Brown was succeeded as commissioner by Raymond Kelly.

The media reported that an interim report, issued by the Mollen Commission in late 1993, showed that "the New York City Police Department had failed at every level to uproot corruption and had instead tolerated a culture that fostered misconduct and concealed lawlessness by police officers," adding that the interim report made "findings that some delegates of the Patrolmen's Benevolent Association, the main police union, may have attempted to block corruption investigations."

The interim report showed that based on a "variety of sources, including police officers and prosecutors," police unions thwarted efforts to expose corruption. The Mollen Commission recommended the creation of a permanent agency with subpoena power and the authority to conduct its own investigations of police corruption. However, the Mollen Commission stopped short of recommending that this permanent agency should have powers to prosecute its own cases, relegating prosecutions to the city prosecutors. "We find as shocking the incompetence and the inadequacies of the department to police itself," the commission's chairman, Milton Mollen, was quoted to have said at the time of the release of its interim report.

In 1994, the Mollen Commission issued its final report.

=== Community-relations task force ===
Former Mayor Rudolph Giuliani formed a community-relations task force after Abner Louima was brutally attacked by several police officers in a Brooklyn precinct house. The recommendations of Giuliani's task force were watered down "to make it easier for Mayor Giuliani, who called some of the report's recommendations unrealistic, to adopt reforms quickly." Three members of the task force issued a dissenting report, calling for stronger recommendations to fight police brutality after finding "a connection between race and police misconduct."

Giuliani dismissed the recommendations made by the majority of his own task force. Furthermore, according to The New York Times, the dissenting report made a recommendation, "the creation of an independent special prosecutor's office with the powers to prosecute police brutality and corruption," but the majority of the task force had rejected that proposal.

=== Civil rights reports ===
The New York Civil Liberties Union (NYCLU) has on three notable occasions drawn attention to NYPD misconduct or failures in oversight.

In April 2003, the NYCLU issued a report about the NYPD's conduct during the massive February 15, 2003, antiwar protest, which took place in Manhattan, making recommendations to avoid "various missteps," which the report indicated to include the NYPD's denial of a permit for the event, and later, during the protest, the use of pepper spray on protesters, the erection of confining pens, the charging of horses into crowds, the use of force to clear demonstrators, and the process by which arrests were made by police. The report issued five recommendations to New York City – recognize the importance of protest marches, ensure free access to protest events, not use force to clear demonstrators, revise its policy of using pens, and revise its policy of arresting demonstrators for minor offenses at protest events. In August 2005, the NYCLU finalized another report, this time examining policing practices during the 2004 Republican National Convention held in New York City. The report documented instances of the use of excessive force and intimidation by police, the use of plainclothes officers in unmarked scooters, the use of nets to stop demonstrators to make mass arrests, the use of cameras to apparently videotape "all protest activity," making unlawful and mass arrests, and t complaints about the length and the hazardous conditions of detention following arrests. Further, the report noted the use of batons, pepper spray, and horses to charge into protesters, and in this report, the NYCLU criticized the NYPD for applying its controversial broken windows theory of policing to demonstrations. In all, the NYCLU escalated the number of recommendations it made from its prior report, suggesting 12 changes to NYPD tactics, which appeared to build on the previous recommendations made in its 2003 report.

In March 2010, the NYCLU released 16 years' worth of reports from the NYPD's Internal Affairs Bureau (IAB). The reports were obtained under a request filed in accordance with the Freedom of Information Act. The documents released consisted of annual IAB reports covering the years from 1993 through 2008. According to analysis by the NYCLU, the number of tips of misconduct or corruption tips received by IAB more than tripled over the period from 1994 to 2006, but the number of serious misconduct investigations was cut by more than half. IAB was investigating about 15% of tips in 1994; by 2004, IAB was only investigating around 2% of tips, revealing a sharp decrease in internal investigatory oversight. In its press release announcing its release and review of the IAB annual reports, the NYCLU further noted, "The annual IAB reports have become less informative over time, with critical information removed from them over time."

=== Failure of oversight ===
Although the Knapp and Mollen commissions were empaneled to investigate corruption and misconduct at the NYPD, they were not empowered to prosecute their own cases.

The Civilian Complaint Review Board (CCRB) was established as an agency in New York City in 1993 to be staffed by civilians with the authority to investigate allegations of police misconduct. However, two decades later, its effectiveness was called into question. In 2014, former CCRB executive director Tracey Catapano-Fox alleged in a federal lawsuit that the CCRB covers up misconduct by NYPD officers. Ms. Catapano-Fox's lawsuit alleged that CCRB chair Richard Emery made a "decision to collude" with the NYPD, among other charges. According to a press report in the Daily News, Ms. Catapano-Fox alleged that Mr. Emery "attempted to conceal recent statistics on the number of stop-and-frisks in the city, and 'suggested' claims not be investigated," adding that, in Ms. Catapano-Fox lawsuit, it was further alleged that Mr. "Emery has made concerted efforts to conceal the true 'stop-and-frisk' statistics."

Following the Mollen Commission's work, then police commissioner William Bratton opposed the central recommendation of the Mollen Commission: The creation of a permanent commission to investigate corruption at the NYPD and monitor the Internal Affairs Bureau. Commissioner Bratton, at the time, opposed the idea that an outside monitor should have investigatory powers. In the wake of the 30th and 48th Precinct station house corruption scandals, Commissioner Bratton, at the time, reportedly did not take action on a comprehensive memorandum prepared by Walter Mack, the former Deputy Commissioner for Internal Affairs, which "concluded that patterns of abuse and corruption complaints in several precincts in central Brooklyn, upper Manhattan, and the Bronx suggested that the corruption uncovered in the 30th and 48th precincts was not unusual," according to The New York Times. Indeed, then Commissioner Bratton had abruptly dismissed Mack, though Mack, who was then described as the "department's top corruption fighter" by The New York Times, had "said the same troubling trend of allegations of brutality and corruption found in the 30th and 48th Precincts exists along a wide swath of northern Manhattan and the southern and western portions of the Bronx, including the 34th, 44th, and 46th Precincts," according to a report in The New York Times. While trying to downplay the size of the problem of police corruption, Bratton testified at a 1994 City Council hearing that "hundreds" of police officers had committed criminal acts.

In 2011, during a months-long investigation by the Associated Press of the NYPD's surveillance of Muslims, the news agency concluded, "The department's primary watchdog, the New York City Council, has not held hearings on the intelligence division's operations and former NYPD officials said council members typically do not ask for details." The complaint that the New York City Council does not adequately oversee the NYPD was repeated by whistleblower Artyom Matusov, who said he was fired by Council Speaker Melissa Mark-Viverito after Matusov went "public with allegations that Police Commissioner Bill Bratton deceived lawmakers at a Sept. 8 hearing by lowballing how often his officers use force on the job," according to the Daily News.

Making it difficult for IAB to investigate reports of misconduct, Brooklyn Borough President Eric Adams, a former NYPD captain, told the wire service Reuters in late 2014 that the IAB leaks the identities of NYPD officers who file complaints against other officers. Of the broken system to investigate official misconduct, Borough President Adams said, "There's no real outlet to report the abuse."

After Eric Garner's July 2014 chokehold death, the Department of Investigation issued a report, examining 10 cases where the CCRB substantiated complaints about officers using chokeholds. The report showed that the NYPD rejected recommendations for discipline in a majority of the examined cases, raising concerns about the lack of accountability for police misconduct. Philip Eure, the inspector general of the NYPD, told The New York Times, "Obviously, we are going to be looking at a broader sample of cases to see if it's more systemic, but people should be troubled by the disconnect that we determined exists already in the disciplinary process."

An independent 2015 investigation into the transparency of New York government agencies showed that the NYPD was resistant to revealing even basic information about itself. A request filed under the state's Freedom of Information Act seeking the names of the NYPD's employees was denied on the basis that a list of employees was information that was not in the "possession, custody, or control" of the agency. The investigation, conducted in joint co-operation between the transparency website MuckRock and the news publication The New York World, surveyed 86 municipal and state agencies. The worst-performing agency was the NYPD, which received the grade of "F" for its resistance to disclosing information about itself.

=== 2020 Eric Garner Anti-Chokehold Act ===
On June 8, 2020, both houses of the New York state legislature passed the Eric Garner Anti-Chokehold Act, which makes it so any police officer in the state of New York who injures or kills somebody through the use of "a chokehold or similar restraint" can be charged with a class C felony, punishable by up to 15 years in prison. New York Governor Andrew Cuomo signed the police reforms, which he described as "long overdue", into law on June 12, 2020.

== See also ==
- Encounter killings by police
- Death in custody
- Gypsy cop
- List of cases of police brutality
- List of killings by law enforcement officers in the United States
- List of wrongful convictions in the United States
- New York City Civilian Complaint Review Board
- Police surveillance in New York City
