= Stop-and-frisk in New York City =

Police use of temporary detainment

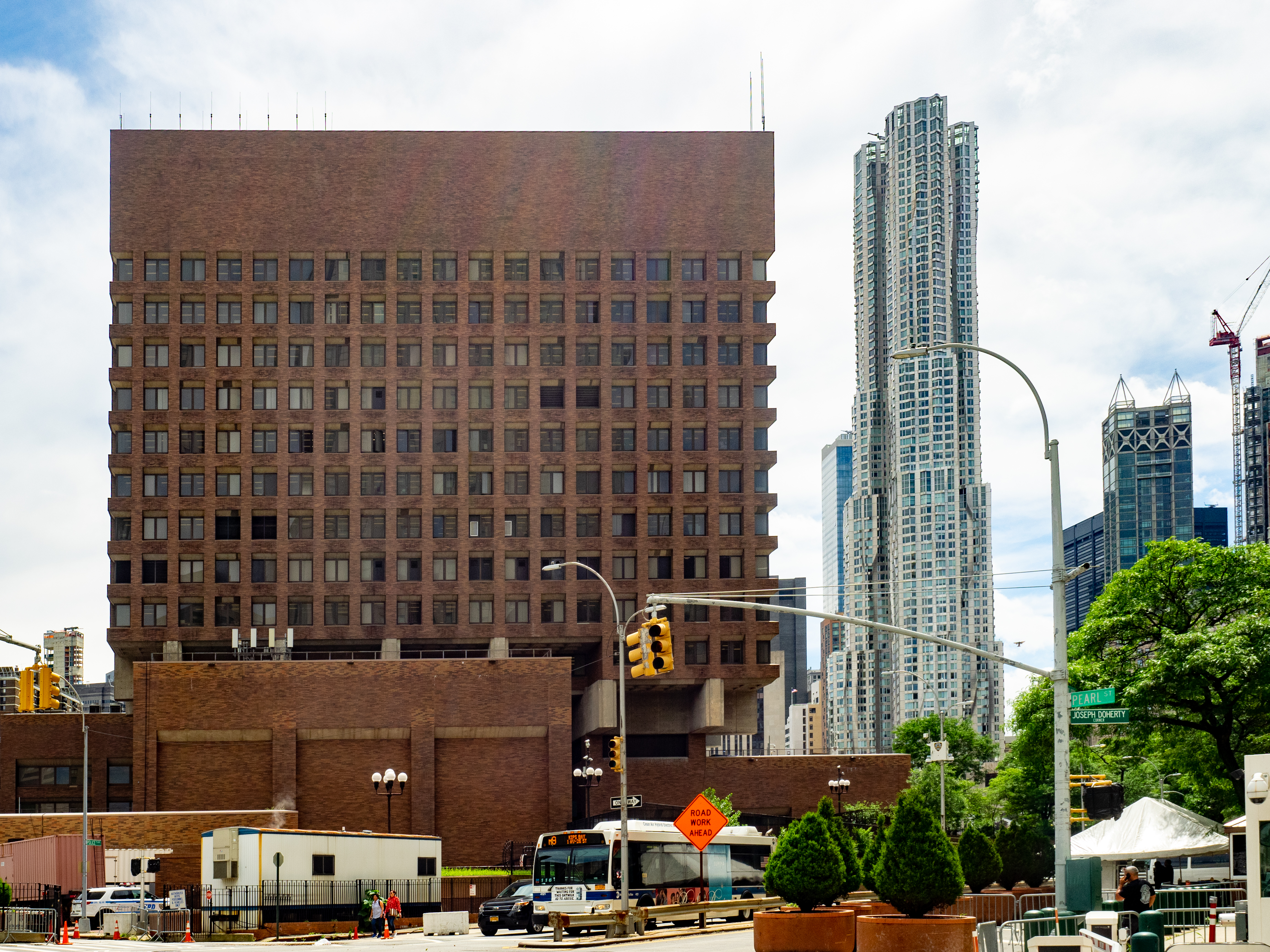
1 Police Plaza, headquarters of the NYPD

In New York City, stop-question-and-frisk program, or stop-and-frisk is a New York City Police Department (NYPD) practice of temporarily detaining, questioning, and at times searching civilians and suspects on the street for weapons and other contraband. This is what is known in other places in the United States as the Terry stop. The rules for the policy are contained in the state's criminal procedure law section 140.50 and based on the decision of the US Supreme Court in the case of Terry v. Ohio.

In 2016, a reported 12,404 stops were made under the stop-and-frisk program. The stop-and-frisk program has previously taken place on a much wider scale. Between 2003 and 2013, over 100,000 stops were made per year, with 685,724 people being stopped at the height of the program in 2011. On average, from 2002 to 2013, the percentage of individuals stopped without any convictions was 87.6%.

The program also became the subject of a racial-profiling controversy. Ninety percent of those stopped in 2017 were African-American or Latino, mostly aged 14–24. By contrast, 54.1% of the population of New York City in 2010 was African-American or Latino; however, 74.4% of individuals arrested overall were of those two racial groups. Research shows that "persons of African and Hispanic descent were stopped more frequently than white people, even after controlling for precinct variability and race-specific estimates of crime participation."

== Legal background of stop-and-frisk ==
Stops by NYPD
Year	Stops
2002	97,296
2003	160,851
2004	313,523
2005	398,191
2006	506,491
2007	472,096
2008	540,302
2009	581,168
2010	601,285
2011	685,724
2012	532,911
2013	191,851
2014	45,787
2015	22,565
2016	12,404
2017	11,629
2018	11,008
2019	13,459

The United States Supreme Court made an important ruling on the use of stop-and-frisk in the 1968 case Terry v. Ohio, hence the stops are also referred to as Terry stops. While frisks were arguably illegal, until then, a police officer could search only someone who had been arrested, unless a search warrant had been obtained. In the cases of Terry v. Ohio, Sibron v. New York, and Peters v. New York, the Supreme Court granted limited approval in 1968 to frisks conducted by officers lacking probable cause for an arrest in order to search for weapons if the officer suspects the subject to be armed and presently dangerous. The Court's decision made suspicion of danger to an officer grounds for a "reasonable search."

In the early 1980s, police officers with reasonable suspicion of a possible crime had the authority to stop someone and ask questions. If, based on the subject's answers, the suspicion level did not escalate to probable cause for an arrest, the person would be released immediately. That was only a "stop-and-question". The "frisk" part of the equation did not come into play except on two cases: if possession of a weapon was suspected, or reasonable suspicion of a possible crime escalated to probable cause to arrest for an actual crime based on facts developed after the initial stop-and-question. That all changed in the 1990s, when CompStat was developed under then-Police Commissioner William Bratton. High-ranking police officials widely incorporated the "stop, question and frisk".

Use of stop-and-frisk is often associated with "broken windows" policing. According to the "broken windows theory", low-level crime and disorder creates an environment that encourages more serious crimes. Among the key proponents of the theory are George L. Kelling and William Bratton, who was Chief of the New York City Transit Police from 1990 to 1992 and Commissioner of the New York City Police Department from 1994 to 1996. Mayor Rudy Giuliani hired Bratton for the latter job and endorsed broken windows policing. Giuliani (mayor 1994–2001) and Bratton presided over an expansion of the New York police department and a crackdown on low-level crimes, including fare evasion, public drinking, public urination, graffiti artists, and "squeegee men".

Bratton acknowledged that the policy caused tension with ethnic communities and that it was less needed in an era of lower crime, but said that it should be used in small doses, "like chemotherapy."

== Measurement ==
In 2002, there were 97,296 "stop-and-frisk" stops made by New York police officers; 82.4% resulted in no fines or convictions. The number of stops increased dramatically in 2008 to over half a million, 88% of which did not result in any fine or conviction, peaking in 2011 to 685,724 stops, again with 88% (603,437) resulting in no conviction. Leading to the remaining 82,287 resulting in convictions. On average, from 2002 to 2013, the percentage of individuals stopped without any convictions was 87.6%.

Part of the stop-question-and-frisk program is executed under Operation Clean Halls, a program in which private property owners grant officers prior permission to enter a property for enforcement against criminal activity.

Some NYPD officers have objected publicly to the department's use of stop-question-and-frisk paperwork as a performance metric, which they claim encourages officers to overuse the practice and creates public hostility. Activists have accused the NYPD of encouraging stops through quotas, which department representatives have denied. In the vast majority of cases, no evidence of wrongdoing is found, and the stopped person is let go.

== Controversy regarding misuse and claims of racial profiling ==
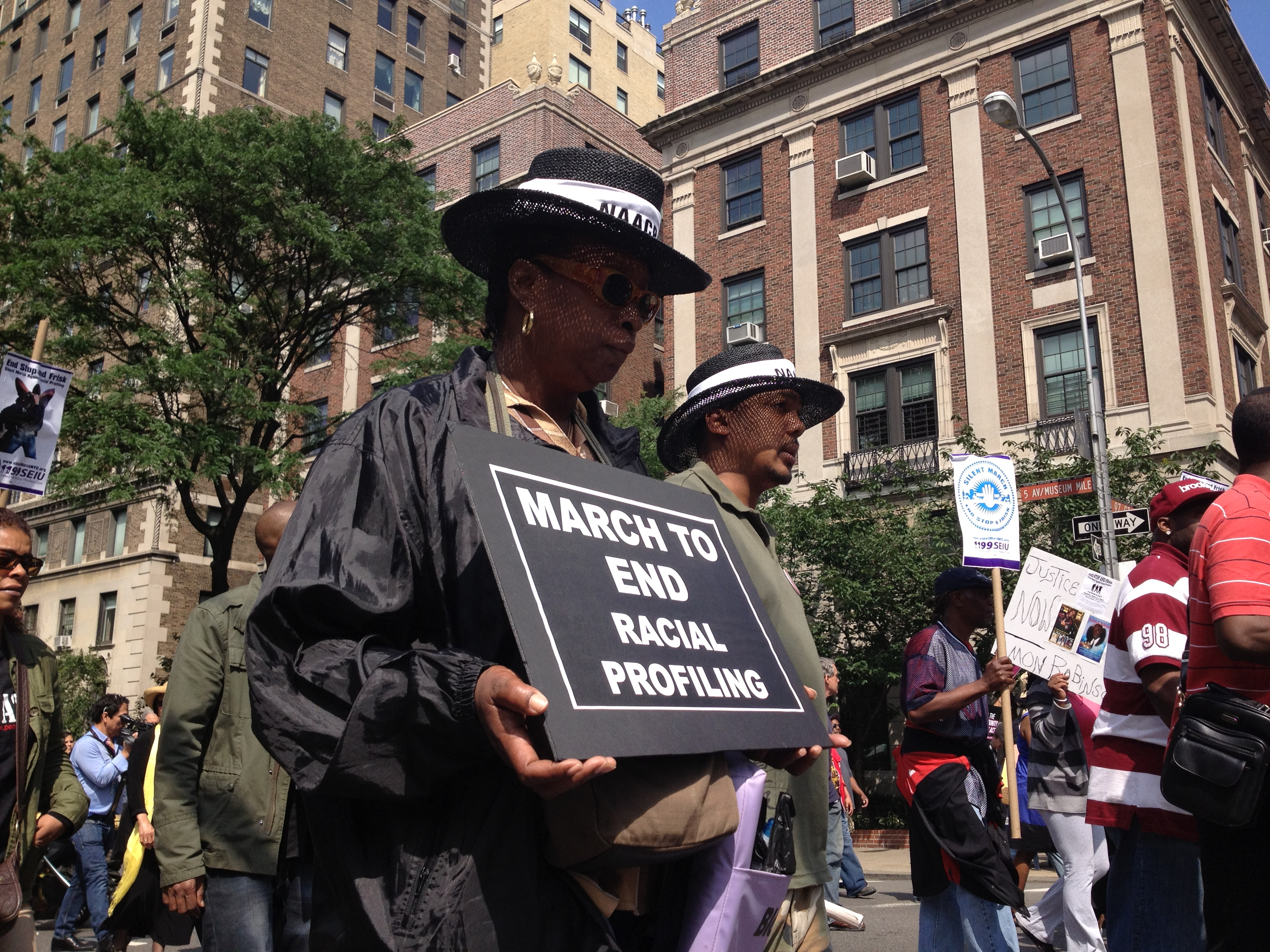
Demonstrators protest racial bias in policing, marching to then-Mayor Michael Bloomberg's house on June 17, 2012

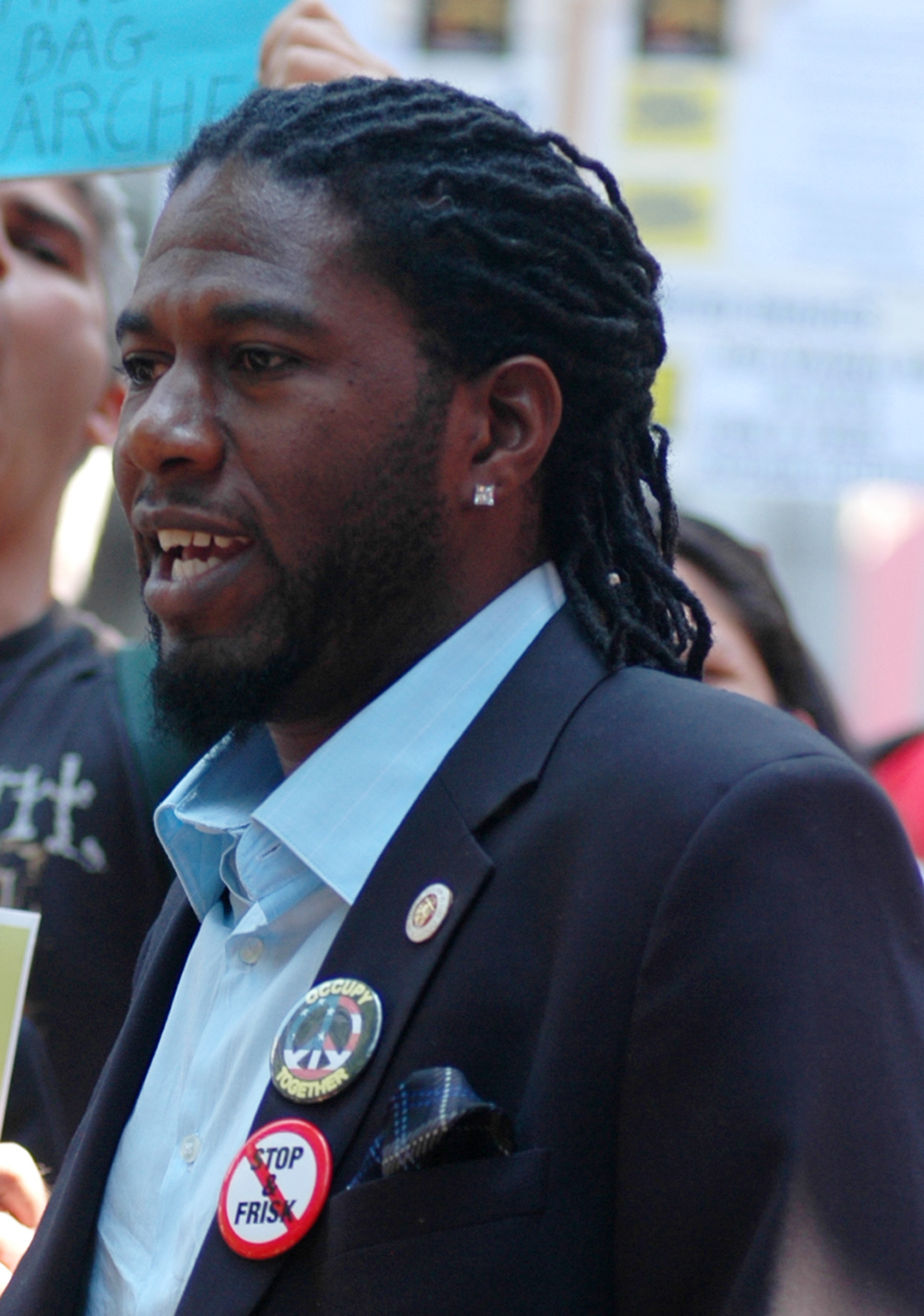
Then-Councilman Jumaane Williams wears a Stop Stop & Frisk Button at a rally.

New York police officer Adrian Schoolcraft made extensive recordings in 2008 and 2009, which documented orders from NYPD officials to search and arrest black people in the Bedford-Stuyvesant neighborhood. Schoolcraft, who brought accusations of misconduct to NYPD investigators, was transferred to a desk job and then involuntarily committed to a psychiatric hospital. In 2010, Schoolcraft sent his tapes to the Village Voice, which publicized them in a series of reports. Schoolcraft alleges that the NYPD has retaliated against him for exposing information about the stop-and-frisk policy. The New York Civil Liberties Union (NYCLU), LatinoJustice PRLDEF, and The Bronx Defenders filed a federal class action against this program.

In response to allegations that the program unfairly targets African-American and Hispanic-American individuals, then-Mayor Michael Bloomberg stated that it is because African-Americans and Hispanic-Americans represent 90% of both perpetrators and victims of violent crime in the city.

On June 17, 2012, several thousand people marched silently down Manhattan's Fifth Avenue from lower Harlem to Bloomberg's Upper East Side townhouse in protest of the stop-question-and-frisk policy. The mayor refused to end the program, contending that the program reduces crime and saves lives.

In early July 2012, stop-question-and-frisk protesters who videotaped police stops in New York City were targeted by police for their activism. A "wanted"-style poster hung in a police precinct headquarters, without any allegation of criminal activity, accused one couple of being "professional agitators" whose "purpose is to portray officers in a negative way and too [sic] deter officers from conducting their responsibilities." Police officers later surveilled and recorded the exit of persons from a "stop stop-and-frisk" meeting held at the couple's residence, allegedly in response to an emergency call of loitering and trespass.

In October 2012, The Nation published an obscenity-filled audio recording that revealed two NYPD officers conducting a hostile and racially charged stop-and-frisk of an innocent teenager from Harlem. Following its upload, the recording soon turned viral, as it triggered outrage and "shed unprecedented light" on the practice of stop-and-frisk.

In June 2013, in an interview with WOR Radio, Michael Bloomberg responded to claims that the program disproportionately targeted minorities. Bloomberg argued that the data should be assessed based on murder suspects' descriptions and not the population as a whole. Bloomberg explained:

One newspaper and one news service, they just keep saying 'oh it's a disproportionate percentage of a particular ethnic group.' That may be, but it's not a disproportionate percentage of those who witnesses and victims describe as committing the [crime]. In that case, incidentally, I think we disproportionately stop whites too much and minorities too little.

In February 2020, an audio recording surfaced of Michael Bloomberg defending the program at a February 2015 Aspen Institute event. In the speech, Bloomberg said:

Ninety-five percent of murders- murderers and murder victims fit one M.O. You can just take the description, Xerox it, and pass it out to all the cops. They are male, minorities, 16-25. That's true in New York, that's true in virtually every city (inaudible). And that's where the real crime is. You've got to get the guns out of the hands of people that are getting killed. So you want to spend the money on a lot of cops in the streets. Put those cops where the crime is, which means in minority neighborhoods. So one of the unintended consequences is people say, 'Oh my God, you are arresting kids for marijuana that are all minorities.' Yes, that's true. Why? Because we put all the cops in minority neighborhoods. Yes, that's true. Why do we do it? Because that's where all the crime is. And the way you get the guns out of the kids' hands is to throw them up against the wall and frisk them… And then they start… 'Oh I don't want to get caught.' So they don't bring the gun. They still have a gun, but they leave it at home.

=== Class-action lawsuit brought by Center for Constitutional Rights ===
In Floyd v. City of New York, decided on August 12, 2013, US District Court Judge Shira Scheindlin ruled that stop-and-frisk had been used in an unconstitutional manner and directed the police to adopt a written policy to specify where such stops are authorized. Scheindlin appointed Peter L. Zimroth, a former chief lawyer for the City of New York, as an independent monitor to oversee the reform program. The decision also mandated that NYPD officers thoroughly justify the reason for making a stop. Mayor Bloomberg indicated that the city would appeal the ruling. Scheindlin had denied pleas for a stay in her remediation of the policing policy, saying that "Ordering a stay now would send precisely the wrong signal. It would essentially confirm that the past practices... were justified and based on constitutional police practices. It would also send the message that reducing the number of stops is somehow dangerous to the residents of this city."

On October 31, 2013, the United States Court of Appeals for the Second Circuit blocked the order requiring changes to the New York Police Department's stop-and-frisk program and removed Judge Shira Scheindlin from the case. On November 9, 2013, the city asked a federal appeals court to vacate Scheindlin's orders. On November 22, 2013, the federal appellate court rejected the city's motion for a stay of the judge's orders.

On July 30, 2014, Southern District Court Judge Analisa Torres denied the police unions' motions to intervene and granted the proposed modification of the District Court's August 2013 remedial decision. A week later, the City of New York filed a motion to withdraw its appeal. On August 13, 2014, the Second Circuit announced the cases would be argued on October 15, 2014. On October 31, a three-judge panel on the Second Circuit unanimously ruled against the unions and allowed the city to proceed with its overhaul of the police department.

==== Settlement of lawsuit and political ramifications ====
A record 685,724 stops were made under the program in 2011. Stops sharply dropped from that peak; in 2013, 191,558 stops were made.

Stop-and-frisk was an issue in the 2013 mayoral election. The race to succeed Bloomberg was won by Democratic Party candidate Bill de Blasio, who had pledged to reform the stop-and-frisk program, and called for new leadership at the NYPD, an inspector general, and a strong racial profiling bill. The number of stops continued to decrease for several years. In August 2014, Newsweek reported while stop-and-frisk numbers were down, they still happened disproportionately in New York City's African-American and Latino neighborhoods.

The next mayor, former police officer Eric Adams, stated during his campaign that stop-and-frisk was a "great tool" that he had frequently used while in the NYPD, and which the city "should never have removed." Under Adams, who entered office in January 2022, NYPD procedures shifted; the NYPD under Adams grew more aggressive and officers had more leeway to make individual decisions to initiate stops while patrolling. Stops began to rise, from 8,946 in 2021 to 25,386 in 2024, according to data provided by NYPD. Court-appointed compliance monitor Mylan Denerstein stated in 2026 that her audits of stops in 2025 found that "Underreporting remains problematic with almost one-third of encounters either not reported or improperly categorized." She also said that "After twelve years of Monitor oversight, the NYPD has yet to reach substantial compliance with this Court’s 2013 order requiring constitutional policing."

=== Class-action lawsuit brought by Bronx Defenders ===
On September 5, 2019, a New York judge granted class-action status to a case brought by The Bronx Defenders on behalf of individuals affected by stop-and-frisk. The lawyers attest that records of individuals who underwent stop-and-frisk were retained by police, despite the law requiring that those records be sealed. The arrestees had cases which were downgraded to non-criminal status, dropped, declined by prosecutors, or thrown out by court. Despite this, personal information such as arrest reports, mugshots, details about appearance, and residential addresses remained in law enforcement databases.

These records were used to increase the charges of individuals later arrested for unrelated crimes, and also continue to be used by the NYPD facial recognition database to track down suspects.

== The politics of stop-and-frisk ==
=== Support ===
Paul J. Browne, an NYPD spokesman, defended the practice, saying "stops save lives, especially in communities disproportionately affected by crime, and especially among young men of color who last year represented 90 percent of murder victims and 96 percent of shooting victims in New York City."

Then-mayor Michael Bloomberg defended the aspect of stopping young black and Hispanic men at rates that "do not reflect the city's overall census numbers", saying that "the proportion of stops generally reflects our crime numbers does not mean, as the judge wrongly concluded, that the police are engaged in racial profiling; it means they are stopping people in those communities who fit descriptions of suspects or are engaged in suspicious activity."

NYC Police Commissioner Raymond Kelly wrote, "the statistics reinforce what crime numbers have shown for decades: that blacks in this city were disproportionately the victims of violent crime, followed by Hispanics. Their assailants were disproportionally black and Hispanic too."

Stop-and-frisk became an issue in the 2016 presidential election, with Donald Trump attributing a nonexistent increase in murders in New York to the reduction of stop-and-frisk.

By the time of the 2020 presidential election cycle, both Bloomberg and Trump backpedalled from their previous support of the tactic.

Democratic politician Eric Adams supports stop-and-frisk, while criticising some specific ways it had been implemented in the past. He promised to bring the practice back in his 2021 mayoral election campaign.

=== Opposition ===
Opponents of the program have claimed that it is racist and has failed to reduce robbery, burglary, or other crime.

As Manhattan Borough President, former New York City Comptroller Scott Stringer argued that the program constitutes harassment of blacks and Latinos because it is disproportionately directed at them.

The NYC Bar Association casts doubt on whether police were applying the "reasonable suspicion" rule when making stops: "The sheer volume of stops that result in no determination of wrongdoing raise the question of whether police officers are consistently adhering to the constitutional requirement for reasonable suspicion for stops and frisks."

In a January 2018 op-ed in the National Review, conservative writer Kyle Smith said that the steep decline in New York City's crime rate since the reduction in the use of stop-and-frisk had shown him that he was wrong about stop-and-frisk; Smith had earlier argued that reducing stop-and-frisk would increase the crime rate.

== Impact ==
=== Racial discrimination ===
A 2007 study in the Journal of the American Statistical Association found that under the stop-and-frisk policy, "persons of African and Hispanic descent were stopped more frequently than whites, even after controlling for precinct variability and race-specific estimates of crime participation."

=== Crime ===
Studies have found that street stops in New York City were not having a beneficial impact on reducing crime in practical terms, meaning that very few of the stops led to actual arrests or weapons found. Most researchers hold the position that stops based on probable cause are more effective at reducing crime.

A 2012 study by Richard Rosenfeld and Robert Fornango found few effects of stop-and-frisk on robbery and burglary rates in New York between 2003 and 2010.

A 2016 study found no evidence that stop-and-frisk was effective. One of the authors of that study, Jeffrey Fagan of Columbia University, said that "you can achieve really very positive crime control, reductions in crime, if you do stops using those probable-cause standards. If you just leave it up to the officers, based on their hunches, then they have almost no effect on crime." Fagan "found stops based on probable cause standards of criminal behavior were associated with a 5–9 percent decline in NYC crime in census block groups."

Another 2016 study by David Weisburd, Alese Wooditch, Sarit Weisburd and Sue-Ming Yang found that stop-and-frisk lowered crime, and that the size of the effect was "significant yet modest". Robert Apel noted a deterrent effect that increased with the volume of stops (finding that each additional stop reduces the probability of crime by 0.02). Weisburd et al. also noted that "the level of SQFs needed to produce meaningful crime reductions are costly in terms of police time and are potentially harmful to police legitimacy." A 2017 study also reported that stop-and-frisk was associated with modest crime reductions, and cautioned against drawing strong causal conclusions. According to the Washington Post fact-checker, the claim that stop-and-frisk contributed to a decline in the crime rate is unsubstantiated.

A 2017 study in The Journal of Politics found that the introduction of a mandate in 2013 that officers provide thorough justifications for stopping suspects led to far fewer stops, fewer innocent persons being detained and increased the ratio of stops that ultimately produced evidence of the crime that the police stopped the suspect for.

=== Economy ===
A study by Matthew Friedman, controlling for relevant factors, finds "that properties exposed to more intense Stop & Frisk activity sold for significantly lower price."

== See also ==
- Carding (police policy), a Canadian equivalent
- Civilian Complaint Review Board
- Consent search
- Crime in New York City
- New York City Cabaret Law
- Police surveillance in New York City
- Powers of the police in England and Wales § Search without arrest
- Proactive policing
- Reasonable suspicion
- Sus law, England and Wales
- Terry stop
- Terry v. Ohio
