= Center for Constitutional Rights =

US nonprofit legal advocacy organization

Center For Constitutional Rights Inc
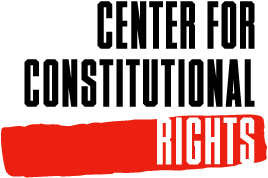
- Abbreviation: CCR
- Founded: Tax-exempt since November 1966; 59 years ago
- Founders: Arthur Kinoy; William Kunstler; Ben Smith; Morton Stavis
- Type: 501(c)(3)
- Tax ID no.: EIN 226082880
- Purpose: "advancing and protecting the rights guaranteed by the United States Constitution and the Universal Declaration of Human Rights"
- Location: New York City
- Region served: United States
- Services: Advocacy, litigation, public education
- Executive Director: Vincent Warren
- Net Assets: 45,470,361 USD (2025)
- Revenue: 13,493,394 USD (2025)
- Expenses: 14,021,916 USD (2025)
- Website: ccrjustice.org

The Center for Constitutional Rights (CCR; formerly Law Center for Constitutional Rights) is an American progressive non-profit legal advocacy organization based in New York City. It was founded in 1966 by lawyers William Kunstler, Arthur Kinoy, Morty Stavis and Ben Smith, particularly to support activists in the implementation of civil rights legislation and to pursue social justice causes.

CCR has focused on civil liberties and human rights litigation, and activism. Since winning the landmark case in the United States Supreme Court, Rasul v. Bush (2004), establishing the right of detainees at Guantanamo Bay detainment camp to challenge their status in US courts and gain legal representation.

CCR's issue areas are: abusive immigration practices, corporate human rights abuses, criminalizing dissent, discriminatory policing, drone killings, government surveillance, Guantanamo, LGBTQI persecution, mass incarceration, Muslim profiling, Palestinian solidarity, racial injustice, sexual and gender-based violence, and torture, war crimes, and militarism.

== History ==
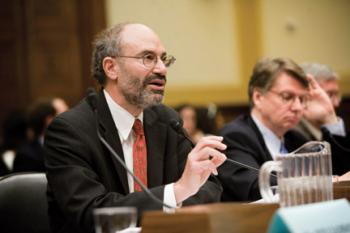
Jules Lobel, current President of the Center for Constitutional Rights, testifying before Congressional subcommittee about the War Powers Act

Incorporation for the Civil Rights Legal Defense Fund was filed on September 9, 1966; in February 1967, the name was changed to the Law Center for Constitutional Rights. In 1970, the name was shortened to the Center for Constitutional Rights. The founders, Morton Stavis, Arthur Kinoy, Ben Smith and William Kunstler, came together through their civil rights work in the American South. By 1970, according to one unaffiliated lawyer quoted at the time, CCR had become "the leading gathering place for radical lawyers in the country."

The Center identified as a "movement support" organization; that is, an organization that concentrated on working with political and social activists to use the courts to promote the activists' work. Cases were chosen to raise public awareness of an issue, generate media attention, and/or energize activists being harassed by local law enforcement in the South. In this regard, the Center differed from more traditional legal non-profits, such as the ACLU, which was more focused on bringing winnable cases in order to extend precedents and develop the law, as well as pursuing First Amendment issues.

In 1998, CCR merged with the National Emergency Civil Liberties Committee (NECLC), an organization originally formed in 1951 to advocate for the civil liberties embodied in the Bill of Rights of the US Constitution, notably the rights of free speech, religion, travel, and assembly.

Since 9/11, it has been known for bringing a variety of cases challenging the Bush administration's detention, extraordinary rendition, and interrogation practices in the so-called "war on terror". When its president Michael Ratner filed Rasul v. Bush in 2002, this was the first lawsuit to challenge President George W. Bush's wartime detentions at Guantanamo Bay Naval Base in Cuba in the early days of the "war on terror". "It was the first time in history that the Court had ruled against the president on behalf of alleged enemy fighters in wartime. And it was the first of four Supreme Court decisions between 2004 and 2008 that rejected President Bush's assertion of unchecked executive power in the "war on terror".

== Notable cases ==
Dombrowski v. Pfister (1965): The CCR's first major case was a successful suit against the Louisiana Un-American Activities Committee to challenge the use of state anti-subversion laws to intimidate civil rights workers. CCR won the case in the Supreme Court, which ruled that such intimidation had a "chilling effect" on First Amendment rights and was therefore unconstitutional.

United States v. Dellinger (Chicago Seven) (1969): CCR attorneys William Kunstler and Leonard Weinglass defended a group of demonstrators arrested following the 1968 Democratic National Convention demonstrations and consequent forceful police response. The original eight defendants, David Dellinger, Rennie Davis, Tom Hayden, Abbie Hoffman, Jerry Rubin, and Bobby Seale, were anti-war, civil rights and human rights activists, and Students for a Democratic Society and Black Panther Party members. Seale's case was declared a mistrial and severed. The remaining seven were found not guilty of their conspiracy charges; five were found guilty of crossing state lines to incite a riot. CCR appealed and those charges were overturned.

Abramowicz v. Lefkowitz (1972): CCR'S Nancy Stearns challenged New York state laws that restricted abortion, and served as a model for challenges to similar laws in other states. This case marks the first instance of challenge to abortion statutes being argued by women as the plaintiffs in terms of women's right to choice rather than a doctor's right to practice.

Monell v. Department of Social Services (1972): This case began as a challenge to New York City's forced maternity leave policies. Its resolution created a precedent that established local government accountability for unconstitutional acts and created the right to obtain damages from municipalities in such cases. Since 1978, this precedent has been used by lawyers and non-profits as a tool to challenge police misconduct, civil rights violations, and other local unconstitutional acts.

State of Washington v. Wanrow (1972): A women's self-defense murder case, CCR became counsel when the appeal process reached the Washington Supreme Court. The appellate court reversal of the original conviction was upheld. The landmark Supreme Court decision had far-reaching effects on women's self-defense and the law.

United States v. Banks and Means (Wounded Knee Occupation) (1974): CCR's Kunstler and Mark Lane represented Russell Means and Dennis Banks, against charges of conspiracy and assault. Means and Banks had been leaders of the American Indian Movement occupation of Wounded Knee, which culminated in a standoff with the Federal Bureau of Investigation (FBI). After an eight-and-a-half-month trial, the US District Court of South Dakota dismissed the charges.

Filártiga v. Peña-Irala (1980): Filártiga established a precedent for the use of the Alien Tort Statute to allow foreign victims of human rights abuses to seek justice in US courts. CCR represented the family of Joelito Filártiga, the son of a left-wing Paraguayan dissident who had been tortured and killed by Paraguayan police. The precedent created by this case has facilitated subsequent international human rights cases, including Doe v. Karadzic and Doe v. Unocal. These cases have established that multinational corporations and other non-state actors can be held responsible for their complicity in human rights violations.

Crumsey v. Justice Knights of the Ku Klux Klan (1982): CCR file for damages against the Ku Klux Klan (KKK) on behalf of five black women in Chattanooga, Tennessee. The women had been shot at, and four injured, by KKK members. It was the first civil rights suit filed against the KKK. The plaintiffs won $535,000 in damages. An injunction was served on the KKK prohibiting them from engaging in violence and from entering the black community.

Paul v. Avril, (1994): In 1991, on behalf of six Haitian political activists, including Evans Paul, Mayor of Port-au-Prince, and under the Alien Tort Statute, the CCR sued former military dictator Prosper Avril for human rights violations. The suit sought compensation for damages that the plaintiffs suffered under Avril's rule. In November 1993, CCR attorneys moved for a default judgment. In July 1994, in an unprecedented decision in which a Haitian dictator or member of the military was held accountable for human rights abuses, a federal magistrate awarded a $41 million damage judgment to the victims of Prosper Avril.

Daniels, et al. v. the City of New York (1999): CCR filed a class action lawsuit challenging the New York City Police Department (NYPD) policy of stop-and-frisk without reasonable suspicion of criminal activity, and alleging the police used racial profiling for targeting. The case was settled, with the NYPD agreeing to a number of NYPD requirements, including a written anti-profiling policy and ongoing audits of the reasonable cause basis for stop-and-frisk activities.

Doe v. Karadzic (2000): In 1993, the Center for Constitutional Rights and co-counsel filed a lawsuit seeking compensation for victims and survivors of Serb leader Radovan Karadzic's campaign of genocide and torture in Bosnia. Karadzic defaulted in 1997. On September 25, 2000, the jury decided on a verdict of $4.5 billion.

Rasul v. Bush (2004): CCR represented Guantanamo detainees seeking fair trials and an end to their indefinite imprisonment without charge. The US Supreme Court case established precedent for US courts' jurisdiction over the Guantanamo Bay prison camp, affirming detainees' right to habeas corpus review, including legal representation. This right was later putatively revoked when President Bush signed the Military Commissions Act into law. CCR brought many of the same habeas corpus petitioners to the Supreme Court again in Boumediene v. Bush (2008), in which the Supreme Court declared the relevant parts of the MCA unconstitutional and restored the rights won in Rasul.

Floyd, et al. v. City of New York, et al. (2013) CCR filed a federal class action lawsuit against the New York City Police Department (NYPD) and the City of New York that challenges the NYPD's practices of racial profiling and "stop-and frisk." These NYPD practices had led to a dramatic increase in the number of suspicion-less stop-and-frisks per year in the city, with the majority of stops in communities of color. On August 12, 2013, a federal judge in a historic ruling found the New York City Police Department (NYPD) liable for a pattern and practice of racial profiling and unconstitutional stop-and-frisks. On January 30, 2014, the City agreed to drop its appeal of the ruling and begin the joint remedial process ordered by the court.

- Wiwa v. Royal Dutch Shell Co. (filed 1996)
- Ziglar v. Abbasi (filed 2002)
- Arar v. Ashcroft (filed 2004)
- Rasul v. Rumsfeld (filed 2004)
- Celikgogus v. Rumsfeld (filed 2006)
- Center for Constitutional Rights v. Bush (filed 2006)
- Abtan v. Blackwater (filed 2007)
- Al Odah v. United States (filed 2007)
- Al Shimari et al. v. CACI (filed 2008)
- Noem v. Al Otro Lado (filed 2017)
- Defense for Children International – Palestine v. Biden (filed 2023)
- Khan Suri v. Trump (filed 2025)
- Khalil v. Trump (filed 2025)
- Burnley v. United States (filed 2026)

== Attorneys ==
The center has coordinated efforts by American lawyers to handle the habeas corpus, and other legal appeals, of several hundred of the Guantanamo detainees. Only American lawyers have been allowed to visit detainees at the Guantanamo Bay detention camps, in Cuba. They have to go through security screening first. And they must agree that they can't speak from the notes they took during their meetings with their clients until they have been cleared for release.

=== Complaints from the detainees' attorneys ===
- Many of the lawyers have repeated claims that their clients have been abused, and are receiving inhumane treatment.
- Lawyers have reported that it was hard to establish trust with their clients, because:
  - Guantanamo guards had warned them that the lawyers were either Jews or homosexuals.
  - Guantanamo interrogators had previously used the interrogation technique "false flag", and represented themselves as their lawyers, in attempts to get the captives to divulge information they had withheld during their interrogations.
- Lawyers reported that the DoD had interfered with their ability to meet with their clients, telling them that they were not spelling their names correctly.
- Lawyers reported that the DoD interfered with their ability to meet with their clients by both refusing to provide a government translator, and raising bogus national security concerns about the translators they proposed.
- The body that reviewed their notes, before they were able to consult them, was arbitrarily classifying their notes, so they could not consult them. Omar Khadr's lawyer Muneer Ahmad found, on his first visit to the secure center which is the only place where the lawyers can review their notes, that almost the entire twenty pages of notes he took when he first met Khadr had been classified above his level of security clearance.

However, an Army investigation found these charges unfounded. US Department of Defense spokesmen state “It is our policy to in no way interfere with legal counsel.”

The Department of Defense maintains that "they see evidence of the al Qaeda-directed misinformation campaign in allegations of detainee abuse and mishandling of the Koran at Guantanamo Bay."

== See also ==
- European Center for Constitutional and Human Rights
- Gitanjali S. Gutierrez
- Hamdi v. Rumsfeld
- International Federation of Human Rights
- Stolen Lives Project
