= Daniels v. City of New York =

1999 lawsuit against the New York Police Department

Daniels, et al. v. the City of New York was a class action lawsuit filed in 1999 against the New York Police Department (NYPD) and the City of New York, charging them with racial profiling and unlawful stop and frisk, and requesting the disbanding of the NYPD Street Crimes Unit.

== Background ==
In February 1999, the Amadou Diallo shooting brought increased attention to the issue of police brutality. NYPD records showed that in 1997 and 1998, 35,000 out of 45,000 stop-and-frisks did not result in an arrest. The statistics showed that 16 African Americans were stopped for every arrest made.

== History ==
The Daniels et al. v. The City of New York et al. was brought to the Center for Constitutional Rights (CCR) by Richie Perez of the National Congress of Puerto Rican Rights during the aftermath of the Diallo shooting.

The defendants initially argued to dismiss the case, citing a 1983 Supreme Court decision, City of Los Angeles v. Lyons. The court denied the dismissal.

The court also denied the plaintiffs' Equal Protection Clause claim, as they set a racial classification, stating that the Street Crimes Unit had a "policy, practice and/or custom of stopping and frisking [individuals] based solely on [their] race and/or national origin."

The City agreed to a settlement on December 12, 2003.

== Terms of settlement ==
The settlement required that the NYPD maintain a written anti-racial-profiling policy that complies with the U.S. and New York State Constitutions and is binding on all NYPD officers. The policy requires that officers who engage in stop-and-frisks be audited, and for their supervisors to determine whether, and to what extent, the act was due to reasonable suspicion, and whether it was being documented.

The audits were then to be given to the Center for Constitutional Rights on a quarterly basis. Furthermore, the NYPD was required to engage in public education efforts, which included joint public meetings with class members and representatives on its racial profiling policy, and workshops at approximately 50 highs on a student's rights when being frisked.

== Results ==
Due to an increase in stop-and-frisks and non-compliance with the decree, the Center for Constitutional Rights later filed a new class action lawsuit, Floyd, et al. v. City of New York, et al.

== See also ==
- List of class action lawsuits
