= Jeffrey Fagan =

American sociologist

- Born: December 17, 1946 (age 78)
- Education: New York University (B.A., 1968), State University of New York at Buffalo (M.S., 1971; Ph.D., 1975)
- Scientific career
- Fields: Sociology, criminology, law, epidemiology
- Institutions: Columbia Law School, Mailman School of Public Health
- Thesis: A predictive model of "success" in criminal justice employment programs (1975)

Jeffrey Alan Fagan (born December 17, 1946) is the Isidor and Seville Sulzbacher Professor of Law at Columbia Law School. He is also the director of that institution's Center for Crime, Community and Law, and a professor of epidemiology at the Mailman School of Public Health.

== Education and career ==
Fagan received his B.A. from New York University in 1968, and his M.A. and Ph.D. from State University of New York at Buffalo in 1971 and 1975, respectively.

== Work ==
Fagan researches multiple topics in the fields of criminal law and social policy, including capital punishment and racial profiling. For example, he is an outspoken critic of stop-and-frisk in New York City, and his research on the practice was a major factor in Shira Scheindlin's decision to strike it down as unconstitutional in 2013. This research includes a 2012 report he authored which found that about 95,000 NYPD stops under this program violated the Fourth Amendment to the United States Constitution's prohibition on unreasonable searches and seizures, because police did not cite reasonable suspicion for conducting the stops in their forms. His research has also found that police stops are most effective in reducing crime when they are based on objectively suspicious behavior, which also reduces the chance that an innocent person will be detained.

In 2016, he and Joscha Legewie co-authored a study that found that in the United States, police killings of black people were higher in cities with more racial polarization, especially when the city has two ethnic groups of equal population. They also found that this effect can be reduced by hiring more black police officers.

== Honors, awards, and positions ==
In 2000, Fagan received the Bruce Smith Sr. Award from the Academy of Criminal Justice Sciences. From 2002 to 2005 he received the Investigator Award in Health Policy Research from the Robert Wood Johnson Foundation, and was named a Soros Senior Justice Fellow by the Open Society Foundations from 2005 to 2006. He served on the Committee on Law and Justice of the National Academy of Sciences from 2000 to 2006. He served on the MacArthur Foundation's Research Network on Adolescent Development and Juvenile Justice from 1996 to 2006. He is a fellow of the American Society of Criminology.

== Editorial activities ==
Fagan serves on the editorial boards of several criminology and law journals. He is a former editor-in-chief of the Journal of Research in Crime and Delinquency.
