= Peter Zimroth =

American lawyer (1943–2021)

Peter Lenard Zimroth (January 11, 1943 – November 8, 2021) was an American legal scholar, public official and private practitioner. As New York City Corporation Counsel from 1987 to 1989, he unsuccessfully defended the constitutional purview of the New York City Board of Estimate in protracted litigation, culminating in its disestablishment under the Equal Protection Clause (pursuant to Reynolds v. Sims) in 1989. In 2013, he became the court-appointed monitor of the New York City Police Department's stop-and-frisk policies and practices.

== Career ==
Peter Lenard Zimroth was born on January 11, 1943, in Brooklyn, New York, the son of Sol and Ruth (née Sadowsky) Zimroth. Raised in the Bensonhurst and Sheepshead Bay sections of Brooklyn, he graduated from Abraham Lincoln High School, Columbia University and Yale Law School, where he was editor-in-chief of the Yale Law Journal.

After receiving his law degree in 1966, he served as a law clerk to Chief Judge David L. Bazelon of the United States Court of Appeals for the District of Columbia Circuit and then for Justice Abe Fortas of the United States Supreme Court. In 1970, he joined the faculty of the New York University School of Law. The next year, he represented police detective and whistleblower David Durk during his testimony before the Knapp Commission.

Zimroth later served as an Assistant United States Attorney for the Southern District of New York and as the Chief Assistant District Attorney of New York County under longtime District Attorney Robert Morgenthau. Following a period of private practice, he served as the New York City Corporation Counsel during the mayoralty of Ed Koch. He argued three cases before the U.S. Supreme Court, including Payton v. New York and Board of Estimate of City of New York v. Morris. After leaving the municipal government, Zimroth became a partner at Arnold & Porter in 1990. Following his retirement from the firm in 2015, he rejoined New York University's law faculty as a Distinguished Scholar in Residence.

On August 12, 2013, U.S. District Court Judge Shira Scheindlin appointed Zimroth to oversee court-ordered reforms to the NYPD’s policies and training related to stop-and-frisk, one of the remedies opinions in the multi-faceted Floyd v. City of New York decision.

== Awards ==
In 2014, the Interfaith Center of New York gave Zimroth the James Parks Morton Interfaith Award.

== Personal life ==
In January 1983, aged 40, Zimroth married his partner of 10 years, actress Estelle Parsons. Later that same year, they adopted Abraham (born 1983), their son. They remained married until his death. Zimroth died on November 8, 2021, aged 78.

== See also ==
- List of law clerks for the second seat of the Supreme Court of the United States
