= Sibron v. New York =

- Supreme Court of the United States

Argued December 11 and 12, 1967 Decided June 10, 1968
- Full case name: Nelson SIBRON, Appellant, v. STATE OF NEW YORK. John Francis PETERS, Appellant, v. STATE OF NEW YORK.
- Citations: 392 U.S. 40 (more) 88 S.Ct. 1889, 20 L.Ed.2d 917

Holding
- Police may stop a person if they have a reasonable suspicion that the person has committed or is about to commit a crime, and may frisk the suspect for weapons if they have reasonable suspicion that the suspect is armed and dangerous, without violating the Fourth Amendment prohibition on unreasonable searches and seizures. A police officer can also ask for a suspect's name, address, and purpose when they stop a suspect in a public place and reasonably suspect them of committing a felony. Sibron's conviction reversed; Peters' conviction upheld.

Court membership
- Chief Justice Earl Warren Associate Justices Hugo Black · William O. Douglas; John M. Harlan II · William J. Brennan Jr. Potter Stewart · Byron White; Abe Fortas · Thurgood Marshall

Case opinions
- Majority: Warren, joined by Stewart, Brennan, Marshall
- Concurrence: Harlan
- Concurrence: White
- Concurrence: Douglas
- Concurrence: Fortas
- Concur/dissent: Black

Laws applied
- U.S. Const. amends. IV, XIV

Sibron v. New York, 392 U.S. 40 (1968) was a Supreme Court companion case to Terry v. Ohio.

== Background ==
=== Sibron's Case ===
On March 9, 1965, NYPD officer Anthony Martin, was patrolling Brooklyn when he spotted Nelson Sibron converse with a group of known narcotics addicts between the hours of 4 PM and 12 AM. Later, he saw Sibron enter a restaurant and talk with three other addicts before ordering pie and a cup of coffee. Martin then approached Sibron and asked him to come outside. As both men were outside, Martin stated, "You know what I am after." According to his testimony during a suppression hearing, Sibron then mumbled incoherently before reaching into his pocket. Martin simultaneously reached into his pocket and pulled out several envelopes containing heroin. During his testimony, Martin did not overhear the contents of the conversations, nor did he observe any objects being passed along. Although the trial judge was about to grant Sibron's motion, the prosecution relayed to him that Sibron admitted that he was talking to the groups about drugs. Sibron then pled guilty while retaining his right to appeal. His conviction was upheld by the appellate court without opinion.

=== Peters' Case ===
On July 10, 1964, off-duty NYPD officer, Samuel Lasky, heard a noise at his apartment door shortly after finishing a shower. After finishing a telephone call, he saw two tiptoeing from an alcove to a hallway staircase from a peephole. Once he got dressed, armed himself, and called the police, Lasky observed a tall man and a shorter man go back to the alcove. Suspecting that he encountered two burglars, he slammed the apartment door after entering the hallway. As the men started to run, Lasky caught the shorter man, Peters, as he ran from the sixth floor to an area between the fifth and fourth floors. Peters was grabbed by the collar while the other suspect escaped. He explained to Lasky that he was visiting his girlfriend, but did not reveal her name due to her already being married. While conducting a patdown, Lasky felt a hard object outside of Peters' pocket that, according to him, might have been a knife. He pulled out an envelope from Peters' pocket full of burglary tools. Lasky testified that he did not recognize either Peters or the unknown suspect as tenants during the 12 years he resided at the complex. Peters' motion to suppress was denied under the reasoning that his response was "clearly unsatisfactory" and that Lasky had reasonable suspicion that he was armed and dangerous.

== Opinion of the Court ==
Chief Justice Earl Warren delivered the majority opinion of the Court. Sibron's conviction was reversed as Officer Martin was ignorant of what his conversations were about. Furthermore, he did not specify that he suspected that Sibron was armed and dangerous; even if he did, he improperly reached into Sibron's pockets rather than feeling the outside areas. However, Peters' conviction was upheld as Lasky not only possessed reasonable suspicion, but also probable cause that he committed burglary based on the circumstances.

=== Black's Concur/Dissent ===
Justice Hugo Black disagreed with the reversal of Sibron's conviction because he opined that Sibron's action of reaching into his pocket can be an indication that someone possesses a dangerous weapon. Additionally, police officers have to make split-second decisions to preserve the lives of themselves and others.
