= New York City Police Department Street Crime Unit =

Former unit of the New York City Police Department

Street Crime Unit
- Active: 1971–2002, 2015–2020
- Country: United States
- Agency: New York City Police Department
- Motto: "We Own The Night"
- Abbreviation: SCU

The New York Police Department's Street Crime Unit was a plainclothes anti-crime unit. The SCU was formed in 1971 as the "City Wide Anti-Crime Unit" and operated for decades tasked with the apprehension of armed felons from the streets of New York City. The unit returned with its original name in 2015 after being disbanded for 13 years, then disbanded again in 2020 along with the rest of the anti-crime teams.

== History ==
From 1971 to 1997, the unit was made up of 60 to 100 members. In 2000 it expanded to 300 members. It employed innovative methods, including possibly the earliest coordinated sting operations to elicit potential muggers. According to Criminal Justice Today: "The SCU disguised officers as potential mugging victims and put them in areas where they were most likely to be attacked."

The SCU would go into high-crime neighborhoods and make a much larger number of firearms-related arrests in comparison to uniformed patrol officers. In 1973, the SCU won recognition as an Exemplary Project from the U.S. Law Enforcement Assistance Administration. The LEAA was the United States' leading crime-reduction and crime-prevention funding agency. "In its first year, the SCU made nearly 4,000 arrests and averaged a successful conviction rate of around 80%. Perhaps the most telling statistic was the 'average officer day per arrest'. "The SCU invested 8.2 days in each arrest, whereas the department average for all uniformed officers was 167 days."

In April of 1979, undercover officer Robert Bilodeau was injured when his throat was slashed while he was working as a decoy with the SCU. Publicity of the attack caused the unit to start using more female officers as decoys, following the theory that women were less likely to be violently attacked. The following year, Bilodeau would become the first member of the SCU to be killed in the line of duty.

On January 14, 1999, two officers from the Street Crimes Unit fired eight shots at rapper Russell "Ol' Dirty Bastard" Jones, a member of the multiplatinum group Wu-Tang Clan. The officers later accused Jones of firing at them after they stopped his car in Bedford–Stuyvesant, Brooklyn. Jones was cleared by a grand jury and insisted that the officers had been scared by his cellular phone. No weapons or shell casings besides those of the officers were found in the vehicle or near the scene.

The unit was disbanded after the outrage spiked in the aftermath of the Amadou Diallo shooting three weeks later. Four plainclothes New York City officers shot at Diallo 41 times in the vestibule of his apartment complex after mistakenly believing he was drawing a firearm. While the officers were acquitted on the charges of murder, New York City did pay out $3 million in a civil suit brought forward by Amadou's mother, Kadijatou Diallo. A federal investigation accused the unit of racial profiling and it was subsequently disbanded in 2002.

The unit was reactivated in 2015 under the Strategic Response Group, with the name "City Wide Anti-Crime Unit". The newer City Wide Anti-Crime Unit was more investigative and intelligence based than the former Street Crimes Unit. In 2020, anti-crime units across the city were disbanded once again following the murder of George Floyd.
