= Floyd v. City of New York =

Legal case

- Court: United States District Court for the Southern District of New York
- Full case name: David FLOYD, Lalit Clarkson, Deon Dennis, and David Ourlicht, on behalf of themselves and all others similarly situated, Plaintiff, v. The CITY OF NEW YORK, et al., Defendants.
- Decided: August 12, 2013
- Citation: 959 F. Supp. 2d 540

Case history
- Subsequent actions: The city initially appealed the ruling but after Mayor Bill de Blasio took office, the city dropped its appeal. The sides are currently in negotiations.
- Related actions: Daniels, et al. v. the City of New York (E.D.N.Y.); Terry v. Ohio (United States Supreme Court)

Holding
- The court held that the city was liable for violating the plaintiffs' Fourth and Fourteenth Amendment rights, due to the police department's widespread practice of suspicionless stops and frisks of African-American and Latino suspects. In a separate order issued the same day, the court ordered a series of remedies, including the appointment of a monitor, immediate reforms to the stop-and-frisk program, revisions to training programs, changes to stop-and-frisk record-keeping, changes to supervision and discipline, the institution of a pilot project providing for the use of body cameras by police officers, and a joint remedial process to ensure continued community input.

Court membership
- Judge sitting: Shira A. Scheindlin

Keywords
- Fourth Amendment, New York City stop-and-frisk program, Racial profiling, New York City Police Department

Floyd, et al. v. City of New York, et al., 959 F. Supp. 2d 540 (S.D.N.Y. 2013), is a set of cases addressing the class action lawsuit filed against the City of New York, Police Commissioner Raymond Kelly, Mayor Michael Bloomberg, and named and unnamed New York City police officers ("Defendants"), alleging that defendants have implemented and sanctioned a policy, practice, and/or custom of unconstitutional stops and frisks by the New York Police Department ("NYPD") on the basis of race and/or national origin, in violation of Section 1983 of title forty-two of the United States Code, the Fourth and Fourteenth Amendments to the United States Constitution, Title VI of the Civil Rights Act of 1964, and the Constitution and laws of the State of New York.

== Facts ==
Although this case is a class action suit filed on behalf of the minority civilians of the city of New York, David Floyd and David Ourlicht specifically alleged that the NYPD had employed "stop and frisk" on them without reasonable suspicion.

Floyd, an African-American man, claimed that on February 27, 2008, he was walking on the path adjacent to his house in the Bronx, New York. He encountered the basement tenant, also an African-American man, who indicated that he was locked out of his apartment and asked for help because Floyd's godmother owned the building. Floyd then went upstairs to retrieve the key and he retrieved seven to ten keys because he was unsure of the correct key for the basement lock. Floyd and the tenant went to the basement apartment door and started trying the various keys. After trying five or six keys, they found the correct one. However, before they could open the door, three NYPD officers approached them and asked the two men what they were doing, told them to stop, and proceeded to frisk them. The officers asked the men to produce identification and interrogated the two men as to whether they lived there and what they were doing.

The officers claimed they had stopped Floyd because they believed Floyd was in the middle of committing a burglary. The officers maintained that Floyd's behavior was suspicious and there had been a burglary pattern for that time of day in the neighborhood. The officers recorded Floyd's stop and frisk on a UF250 form, indicating that the suspected crime was burglary. In response to the question "Was Person Searched?," the officers checked "No." The three officers also claimed that they were unaware of any quotas or expectations that they complete a certain number of stops or UF250s per tour or per month.

David Ourlicht, who is of African-American and Italian ancestry, testified that around 10 a.m. on the morning of either June 6 or June 9, 2008, he was sitting on a bench with an African-American male friend, outside the Johnson public housing complex in Harlem, New York. After sitting on the bench for about ten minutes, Ourlicht noticed two male uniformed police officers walking through the housing complex. When the two officers reached the corner, they turned, drew their weapons and screamed " ‘Get on the floor, get on the floor!’ and ‘There's a gun around here. Everybody get on the floor!’ " At the same time, a blue and white police van arrived and three or four officers exited the van. All of the police officers were running and had their guns out. The officers told Ourlicht that they had received reports that there was a gun in the vicinity. The officers patted Ourlicht down, lifted him by the belt, "check[ed] underneath [him], and check[ed his] pockets." The other individuals sitting outside were also told to lie on the ground, were lifted by their belts, and were searched. After the men had been lying on the ground for about ten minutes, the officers told them they could get up. The officers then demanded that all of the men provide their names and identification. The NYPD was unable to provide any evidence to support the notion that the police received a report of a gun in Ourlicht's vicinity on June 6 or June 9, 2008, or that a gun was ever recovered from the area.

On August 24, 2009, Ourlicht participated in a photo array procedure with his counsel and defendants' counsel in an attempt to identify the officers who were involved with the June 2008 stop. Ourlicht viewed a total of four hundred and two photographs and indicated eleven officers who he thought might have been present at the time of the incident. Of those eleven officers, only one was assigned to the patrol area at the time of the incident. The other ten officers who were identified were either not employed by the NYPD at the time of the incident or were not assigned to the patrol area at the time.

Independent of these two occurrences, various NYPD officers testified that they have been instructed to complete a certain number of stops or arrests, or to issue a certain number of summonses, per tour or per month; and certain supervisors have testified they have so instructed their subordinates. The plaintiffs also submitted audio recordings on which various precinct commanders issued orders to produce certain numbers of arrests, stops and frisks, and summonses during roll call. In addition, plaintiffs stated that in May 2004, the Patrolmen's Benevolent Association filed a labor grievance on behalf of six officers and one sergeant who were transferred out of the 75th precinct for allegedly failing to meet a ten summons-per-month quota. In January 2006, a labor arbitrator found that the 75th precinct had imposed summons quotas on its officers in violation of New York State labor laws. One officer testified that when he was a patrol officer in the 41st Precinct, he witnessed his fellow officers illegally stop, search, handcuff, and charge minority residents with crimes. He furthered testified that he had witnessed fellow officers stop civilians without reasonable suspicion and issue summonses without probable cause; and on several occasions, he and his fellow officers were ordered by supervisors to fill out and sign UF250 forms for stops and frisks that they did not conduct or observe and to issue criminal court summonses for incidents they did not observe.

Plaintiffs David Floyd, Lalit Clarkson, Deon Dennis, and David Ourlicht bring this putative class action against the City of New York, Police Commissioner Raymond Kelly, Mayor Michael Bloomberg, and named and unnamed New York City Police Officers ("Defendants"), alleging that defendants have implemented and sanctioned a policy, practice, and/or custom of unconstitutional stops and frisks by the New York Police Department ("NYPD") on the basis of race and/or national origin, in violation of Section 1983. Aside from their individual claims, the plaintiffs alleged that the NYPD purposefully engaged in a widespread pattern and practice of concentrating its stop and frisk activity on Black and Hispanic neighborhoods based on their racial composition rather than legitimate non-racial factors, with the result that Blacks and Hispanics are unconstitutionally burdened by illegal stops on the basis of their race.

== Legal background ==
The New York City stop-and-frisk program is a practice of the New York City Police Department by which a police officer who reasonably suspects a person has committed, is committing, or is about to commit a felony or a penal law misdemeanor, stops and questions that person, and, if the officer reasonably suspects he or she is in danger of physical injury, frisks the person stopped for weapons. The rules for stop and frisk are found in New York State Criminal Procedure Law section 140.50, and are based on the decision of the United States Supreme Court in the case of Terry v. Ohio About 684,000 people were stopped in 2011. The vast majority of these people were African-American or Latino. New York City residents have questioned whether these stops are based on reasonable suspicion of criminal activity. According to NYPD statistics from 2002 through 2012, an average of one in eight people stopped were accused of a crime.

In 2003, the United States District Court for the Eastern District of New York first addressed the NYPD's application of "stop and frisk" on minority groups in Daniels, et al. v. the City of New York. Daniels was resolved through a settlement agreement requiring the City to adopt several remedial measures intended to reduce racial disparities in stops and frisks. Under the terms of that settlement, the NYPD enacted a Racial Profiling Policy; revised the UF250 form, otherwise known as a "Stop, Question and Frisk Report Worksheet," so that stops would be more accurately documented; and instituted regular audits of the UF250 forms, among other measures. The policy "prohibits the use of race, color, ethnicity or national origin as a determinative factor in taking law enforcement action," though those markers may be used to identify a suspect in the same way that pedigree information (height, weight, and age, etc.) is used. The Racial Profiling Policy further requires that commanding officers establish self-inspections within their command to monitor compliance with the policy; that the NYPD Quality Assurance Division ("QAD") audit compliance with the self-inspection directive; and that CompStat review include consideration of "performance in this area."

== The decisions ==
On August 31, 2011, the United States District Court for the Southern District of New York held that (1) in Floyd's case, the officers had reasonable suspicion that suspect was engaged in burglary, warranting Terry stop and search; (2) in Ourlicht's case, an issue of material fact existed as to whether individuals who stopped suspect were from police department; and (3) an issue of material fact existed as to whether police department engaged in widespread practice of suspicionless stops and frisks of African-American and Latino suspects. The court granted the City of New York's motion for summary judgment on Floyd's Fourth Amendment claim on the grounds that a reasonable jury could find that it was objectively unreasonable for the officers to search Floyd based on a determination of reasonable suspicion. The court further held that the officers did not impermissibly use race as the determinative factor in deciding to stop and frisk Floyd. Floyd subsequently filed a motion for reconsideration with the court.

However, the court denied the motion for summary judgment regarding the class action Fourth Amendment claim. The Honorable Shira A. Scheindlin found that, "there is a triable issue of fact as to whether the NYPD leadership has been deliberately indifferent to the need to train, monitor, supervise, and discipline its officers adequately in order to prevent a widespread pattern of suspicionless and race-based stops." The court held that regardless of the changes required by Daniels, et al. v. the City of New York, the City's purported corrective actions were insufficient to negate the inference that intentional discrimination was the City's "standard operating procedure."

Floyd's motion was granted, and on November 23, 2011, the District Court for the Southern District of New York held that there was a genuine issue of material fact existed as to whether Floyd was in an area with pattern of burglaries.

On August 12, 2013, Judge Scheindlin ruled that the police department had violated the Fourth Amendment by conducting unreasonable searches and the Fourteenth Amendment by systematically conducting stops and frisks in a racially discriminatory manner.

== Status ==
The case went to trial on March 18 through 20, 2013. On August 12, 2013, Judge Scheindlin handed down two rulings in favor of the plaintiffs, one on liability and one dealing with remedies. The remedies opinion also applied to Ligon, et al. v. City of New York, a lawsuit brought by the New York Civil Liberties Union, The Bronx Defenders, LatinoJustice PRLDEF, and the law firm Shearman & Sterling LLP challenging the use of stops and frisks in private buildings through what is known as Operation Clean Halls. Included in Judge Scheindlin's remedies opinion were a number of significant measures, including the establishment of an independent monitor to oversee the police department's reform efforts, initially Peter L. Zimroth. As of 2026, the monitor is Mylan Denerstein, appointed in 2022.

On October 31, 2013, the United States Court of Appeals for the Second Circuit granted the City's motion to stay the "remedial opinion" and the "liability opinion" while the appeal was pending. The Second Circuit remanded the case to District Court to be heard by a new judge on the basis that the district court judge had run afoul of the Code of Conduct for United States Judges. The Appeals Court held this because she had appeared to signal plaintiffs in Daniels v. City of New York, No. 99 Civ. 1695, 2001 WL 228091 (S.D.N.Y. filed Mar. 8, 1999) in 2007 that she would accept a case as related if plaintiffs brought one with "inappropriate racial profiling," and also stated, “[W]hat I am trying to say, I am sure I am going to get in trouble for saying it, for $65 you can bring that lawsuit.” The court also noted that she had given several interviews regarding the case. However, the City indicated on January 30, 2014, that it would drop its appeal, thus re-instating the district judge's orders.

Since the ruling, stop-and-frisk dramatically decreased in New York City for several years. From a height of 685,000 stops in 2011, the New York Civil Liberties Union reported that (based on data provided by the NYPD) the department made only around 10,800 stops in 2017. However, beginning in 2021, stops began to rise, from 8,946 in 2021 to 25,386 in 2024. Court-appointed monitor Denerstein stated in 2026 that her audits of stops in 2025 found that "Underreporting remains problematic with almost one-third of encounters either not reported or improperly categorized." Further, "the overall compliance rate for self-initiated stops is likely lower than reported" because of a three-year period during which the NYPD failed to audit stops by certain teams that "frequently engage in proactive policing, including a substantial number of self-initiated stops." She also said that "After twelve years of Monitor oversight, the NYPD has yet to reach substantial compliance with this Court’s 2013 order requiring constitutional policing."

== See also ==
- Davis v. City of Las Vegas (9th Cir. 2007)
