= Mylan Denerstein =

American lawyer

- Education: Columbia Law School (JD)
- Occupation: Lawyer
- Employer: Gibson, Dunn & Crutcher

Mylan Denerstein is an American lawyer. She serves as a partner and co-partner-in-charge at Gibson, Dunn & Crutcher, as well as a court-appointed independent monitor of the New York City Police Department.

In 2024, Denerstein was named to City and State New York's list of Trailblazers in Law. In 2025, she was then named to the City and State New York's Law Power 100. In the same year, she was also named in Crain's New York Business' list of Notable Litigators & Trial Attorneys.

== Personal life ==
Denerstein is biracial; her father is Jewish and her mother is African-American. She is married to a schoolteacher, and has two children.

== Career ==
Denerstein graduated from Columbia Law School in 1993.

In December 2009, Denerstein announced her hopes to become the first female fire commissioner of the New York City Fire Department, after Nicholas Scopetta announced his retirement in October of that year. Mayor Michael Bloomberg ultimately appointed Salvatore Cassano to the position.

In 2010, Denerstein became Counsel to the Governor of New York Andrew Cuomo after having served as the Executive Deputy Attorney General for Social Justice under his tenure as State Attorney General since 2007. The Wall Street Journal described her as "a powerful but largely behind-the-scenes force in both the attorney general's and governor's offices" and "the top woman and African-American in Mr. Cuomo's inner circle." In 2013, she was the "chief architect" of the Women's Equality Act. Denerstein also served as the Deputy Commissioner for Legal Affairs for the New York City Fire Department.

In 2018, Denerstein joined Gibson, Dunn & Crutcher as a partner.

In 2022, Denerstein was appointed, by Judge Analisa Torres of the Southern District of New York, to be an independent monitor of the New York City Police Department, a role established in the Floyd v. New York decision. In early 2025, she filed a report in federal court stating that a quarter of stops made in 2023 by the Neighborhood Safety Teams and Public Safety Teams, which had been deployed starting in 2022, were unlawful and that the rate of "unlawful stops, frisks and searches" somewhat worsened since then. Her Feb. 17, 2026 report stated that these trends had continued: "After twelve years of Monitor oversight, the NYPD has yet to reach substantial compliance with this Court’s 2013 order requiring constitutional policing."

Denerstein is a member of the boards of Sanctuary for Families and American Red Cross of Greater New York.
