= Blue wall of silence =

Informal rule that American police do not report misconduct by other officers

The blue wall of silence, also blue code and blue shield, are terms used to denote an informal code of silence among police officers in the United States not to report on a colleague's errors, misconduct, or crimes, especially as related to police brutality. If questioned about an incident of alleged misconduct involving another officer (e.g., during the course of an official inquiry), when following the code, the officer being questioned will perjure themselves by feigning ignorance of another officer's wrongdoing.

== Police corruption ==
The code is one example of police corruption and misconduct. Officers who engaged in discriminatory arrests, physical or verbal harassment, and selective enforcement of the law are considered to be corrupt, while officers who follow the code may participate in some of these acts during their careers for personal matters or in order to protect or support fellow officers. All of these are considered illegal offenses and are grounds for suspension or immediate dismissal. Officers who follow the code are unable to report fellow officers who participate in corruption due to the unwritten laws of their "police family".

Police perjury or "testilying" (in United States police slang) is when an officer gives false testimony in court. Officers who do not lie in court may sometimes be threatened and ostracized by fellow police officers. In 1992, the Commission to Investigate Allegations of Police Corruption (also known as the Mollen Commission) undertook a two-year investigation on perjury in law enforcement. They discovered that some officers falsified documents such as arrest reports, warrants and evidence to provide "cover" for an illegal arrest or search. Some police officers also fabricated stories when testifying before a jury. The commission found that the officers were not lying for greed but because they believed that they were imprisoning people who deserved it. Many prosecutors allowed police perjury to occur, as well.

== Laws ==
Many police departments have their own official code of conduct and investigate officers about whom they have a complaint. There are also some state laws that aim to protect the public from corrupt officers. If found guilty, officers can be sued by the victim for damage caused by police brutality, false arrest and imprisonment, malicious prosecution, and wrongful death. Federal laws also prohibit certain police misconduct, including "testilying" or failing to report an officer who is participating in corruption. Police departments do not enforce these laws; if an officer is in violation, only the federal government can issue a suit. It is often hard to convict an officer of following the code or other forms of corruption because they are protected by immunity, which is an exemption from penalties and burdens that the law generally places on private citizens.

The U.S. Supreme Court has consistently held that officers be given the benefit of the doubt that they acted lawfully in fulfilling their duties, a position reaffirmed in Saucier v. Katz, 533 U.S. 194 (2001).

== Cases ==
In 1970, New York City organized the Knapp Commission to hold hearings on the extent of corruption in the city's police department. Police officer Frank Serpico's startling testimony against fellow officers not only revealed systemic corruption but highlighted a longstanding obstacle to investigating these abuses: the fraternal understanding among police officers known variously as "the Code of Silence" and "the Blue Curtain" under which officers regard testimony against a fellow officer as betrayal. In 1991, the Christopher Commission was formed in Los Angeles in response to the beating of Rodney King in March of that year by four members of the Los Angeles Police Department. In 1992, the Mollen Commission, commissioned to investigate reports of police corruption in New York City, noted that "The pervasiveness of the code of silence is itself alarming." One New York City police officer said, "If a cop decided to tell on me, his career's ruined... He's going to be labeled as a rat." The following year saw the founding of the Civilian Complaint Review Board, an all-civilian board tasked with investigating civil complaints about alleged misconduct on the part of the New York City Police Department.

After that, the International Association of Chiefs of Police made a code of police conduct publication and rigorously trained police officers. In 1991, Rodney King was brutally beaten by multiple police officers of the Los Angeles Police Department. The officers involved were expected to have been following the "blue code". They claimed that the beating was lawful, but it was not until a videotape of the incident was released when it was confirmed that the officers had collectively fabricated their stories.

In the later 1990s, the FBI arrested 42 officers from five law enforcement agencies in 1998 on charges of conspiracy to distribute cocaine. In a 1998, report to U.S. Congressman Charles B. Rangel, the federal General Accounting Office found evidence of growing police involvement in drug sales, theft of drugs and money from drug dealers, and perjured testimony about illegal searches.

== History ==
The code and police corruption stems from the mid-to-late nineteenth century. The Pinkerton National Detective Agency was known for using police officers to violently end strikes. Many members of the Ku Klux Klan were police officers who protected each other when conducting racist acts. This later gave rise to the Civil Rights Act of 1964, which gave new protections to the victims who had long suffered discriminatory policing.

"Additionally, a string of landmark Supreme Court decisions during the era gave new force both to individual privacy rights as well as to curbs upon Police Power: highly influential cases resulted in the strengthening of Fourth Amendment rights against unreasonable Search and Seizure, evidentiary rules forbidding the use at trial of evidence tainted by unconstitutional police actions, and the establishment of the so-called Miranda Warning requiring officers to advise detained suspects of their constitutional rights."

This would result in the criminalization of officers who (1) did not have the necessary paperwork to conduct a search or (2) were involved in falsifying documents or committing perjury.

A double standard exists of perceived rewards or a dismissal of charges for an officer with overwhelming evidence of guilt for unlawful criminal offenses. This double standard is further supported by police commands providing the "slap on the wrist" after strategizing a delay to reduce public media attention.

== Police culture ==
Police culture, or "cop culture", as it is sometimes called by police officers, has resulted in a barrier against stopping corrupt officers. Police culture involves a set of values and rules that have evolved through the experiences of officers and which are affected by the environment in which they work. From the beginning of their career at their academies, police are brought into this "cop culture".

While learning jobs and duties, recruits will also learn the values needed to make it to a high rank in their organization. Some words used to describe these values are as follows: a sense of mission, action, cynicism, pessimism, machismo, suspicion, conservatism, isolation and solidarity. The unique demands that are placed on police officers, such as the threat of danger, as well as scrutiny by the public, generate a tightly woven environment conducive to the development of feelings of loyalty.

These values are claimed to lead to the code; isolation and solidarity lead to police officers sticking to their own kind, producing an us-against-them mentality. The us-against-them mentality that can result leads to officers backing each other up and staying loyal to one another; in some situations, it leads to not "ratting" on fellow officers.

== Whistleblowing ==
Whistleblowing (police officers reporting other officers' misconduct) is not common. The low number of officers coming forward may have to do with the understanding that things happen in the heat of the moment that some officers would rather keep personal. Another reason officers may hesitate to go against the blue code may be that challenging the blue code would mean challenging long-standing traditions and feelings of brotherhood within the institution. The fear of consequences may play a large role as well. These consequences can include being shunned, losing friends, and losing backup, as well as receiving physical threats or having one's own misconduct exposed.

There are also forces that work against the code and promote whistleblowing. Many police officers do join the police force because they want to uphold the law; the blue code goes against this ideal. Some officers inform on fellow officers' misconduct for less noble motives, such as to retaliate for mistreatment by fellow officers, to seek administrative recognition, or to prove loyalty to the department. Additionally, some officers are recruited by their administration to inform. If it is in an officer's job description to find misconduct by other officers, they are more likely to go against the blue code. Officers who go against the blue code may have a deal to avoid being fired or to receive immunity from prosecution. Some officers have also been known to break the code to sell a story to the media.

== Levels of crime ==
Police officers are more likely to cover up certain kinds of crimes by their colleagues. One study showed that excessive use of force was the crime most commonly shielded by the code. Two studies suggest that some police feel that the code is applicable in cases of "illegal brutality or bending of the rules in order to protect colleagues from criminal proceedings", but not those of illegal actions with an "acquisitive motive".

Cases such as the Rampart scandal and many other police corruption cases demonstrate that blue code culture can extend to cover-ups of other levels of crime, acquisitive or not. The code has been called "America's Most Successful Stop Snitchin' Campaign", referring to cases where police covered up the misdeeds of fellow officers and where whistleblowers were harassed, professionally sanctioned, or forced into retirement.

== Exposing the code ==
One method of minimizing the effects of the blue wall of silence is exposing those who follow it. Many states have taken measures in police academies to promote the exposure of the blue code. In most cities, before being admitted into the academy one must pass a criminal background check. Through additional background checks, polygraph testing, and psychological evaluations, certain departments are better able to select individuals who are less likely to condone wrongdoing. In these departments, police are exposed to a basic training curriculum that instructs on ethical behavior; this instruction is reinforced in seminars and classes annually in some cases.

Several campaigns against the blue code of silence or for making it more visible in the public eye have taken place in the United States. One of the first of these campaigns was the Knapp Commission in New York (officially known as the Commission to Investigate Alleged Police Corruption) which was headed by Mayor John V. Lindsay in 1970. Over 20 years after the Knapp Commission the Mollen Commission was established in 1992 by New York City Mayor David Dinkins to investigate the nature and extent of corruption in the New York City Police Department, and to recommend changes to improve these procedures. These and other investigations have revealed details of the inner workings of the NYPD.

== See also ==
- Christopher Dorner
- Joseph Gray, a police officer criminally charged and convicted of DUI manslaughter, but allegedly protected by his colleagues
- The Murder of Sherri Rasmussen by LAPD officer Stephanie Lazarus.
- Internal affairs (law enforcement)
- Rampart scandal
- Spiral of silence
- Omertà – Southern Italian code of honor and silence
- Joe Sánchez
- Robert Leuci
- Adrian Schoolcraft
- West Midlands Serious Crime Squad
- Thin blue line
- Gypsy cop
- Blue flu
- Sin of omission – Type of sin
