= Robert Leuci =

American detective and whistleblower (1940–2015)

- Born: February 28, 1940; Queens, New York, U.S.
- Died: October 12, 2015 (aged 75); Saunderstown, Rhode Island, U.S.
- Police career
- Department: New York City Police Department (NYPD)
- Service years: 1961–1981
- Rank: Detective Second Grade
- Other work: Writer, college professor

Robert Leuci (February 28, 1940 – October 12, 2015) was a detective with the New York City Police Department (NYPD), known for his work exposing corruption in the police department and the criminal justice system.

After retiring from the NYPD, he wrote novels, short stories, TV episodes, and a memoir of his years on the force. He taught and had residencies at over 40 universities and law schools. And at many US police departments and the FBI Academy in Quantico, Virginia, he lectured on morality and ethics erosion. Leuci knew Frank Serpico, known for being the first officer to expose corruption within the police department ranks.

The book Prince of the City (1978) by Robert Daley and the adapted Sidney Lumet film (1981) are based on a portion of Leuci's police career.

== Early years ==
Leuci was born in Brooklyn, New York, on February 28, 1940, to an Italian-American family. He was the son of James Leuci, a union official, and Lucy, a housewife. Right after his birth, the family moved to Ozone Park, Queens, where he attended John Adams High School. After high school, he attended Baker University in Kansas and then New York University, Fordham University, and The New School for Social Research in New York City.

== NYPD career ==
At nineteen, Leuci took the test to enter the New York City Police Academy. At twenty-one, he graduated, becoming a member of the NYPD in 1961.

As a rookie, he was assigned to the 100th Precinct in Rockaway Beach, Queens. In 1962, he transferred to the Tactical Patrol Force (TPF), where he worked the Manhattan North and South Bronx precincts. In TPF, he worked in the city's highest crime areas. Leuci established relationships with street contacts, and he became one of the top arresting officers in the division. Leuci was transferred to the Narcotics Bureau for undercover work when he was 24. He created a network of field informants that led him to work numerous important cases. One of his first assignments was as a student who bought drugs at a high school.

Leuci soon entered the Special Investigative Unit (SIU) of the Narcotics Bureau, an elite unit formed by top detectives. In SIU, street dealers' cases no longer represented his team's objective. Rather, the unit aimed to find the major sources of drug distribution in the country and make cases against South American or other foreign cartel operatives.

== Corruption investigation ==
The late 1960s were times in which NYPD officers like Frank Serpico and David Durk began battling widespread corruption within the NYPD. In the 1970s, Serpico and Durk came to believe that Leuci was the only honest detective in the Narcotics Bureau, though at the time, he was one of the corrupt.

In 1970, as a result of Serpico and Durk's revelations, New York City Mayor John V. Lindsay, along with a five-member investigative committee, created the Knapp Commission, named after its chairman, Judge Whitman Knapp. Soon afterward, the commission began questioning several members of the force, from patrolmen to high-ranking officials.

Serpico and Durk both asked Leuci if he would speak to Assistant US Attorney Nick Scoppetta. Leuci and Scoppetta developed a close relationship almost immediately. Leuci pointed out that the Knapp commission was focused only on the police and that that was unacceptable: the criminal justice system in New York City was corrupt as well, and the police were working within a system that had been in place for 50 years or more. Leuci told Scoppetta he would not be involved in an investigation that focused solely on the police department. However, if Scoppetta was willing, Leuci would do the undercover work into an investigation into the entire system. Scoppetta agreed. Leuci was given a code name: Sonny.

Scopetta and his colleague Michael Shaw soon understood Leuci's emotional conflict about his investigative role. They supported him, knowing it would be the start of harsh times for law enforcement in the city. From that moment on, Leuci wore a wire whenever he had to meet with any suspects.

Leuci's cooperation lasted two years, after which the SIU no longer existed. Detectives and other officers, along with lawyers and many who had ties with the corrupt criminal justice system, were tried in court and imprisoned. Some of Leuci's colleagues committed suicide as the pressure mounted throughout the investigation.

The investigation ended in 1972 and ultimately, the Federal Government decided not to prosecute Leuci, noting his efforts and the risks that he and his family had taken. By that time, Leuci's work in the department had taken a toll, but he continued working at the academy as a lecturer and in the Internal Affairs Division until his retirement in 1981 after 20 years

His experience inspired former NYPD Deputy Commissioner Robert Daley, who had become a writer since his retirement, to write Leuci's recount of this story, Daley's best-selling book Prince of the City (1978). That same year, director Sidney Lumet and executive producer Jay Presson Allen began adapting the book for a movie, a critically acclaimed though financially disappointing 1981 movie of the same title. Treat Williams portrayed Leuci.

Of note, future New York mayor Rudy Giuliani was part of the Knapp Commission investigation. A short time later Giuliani became the US Attorney for the Southern District.

== After the NYPD ==
Leuci's desire to write grew after Daley's book was published, and thanks to an afternoon walk with novelist Robert Stone, a new career path began. Leuci wrote seven successful books, while continuing to lecture at police academies and federal law enforcement agencies throughout the United States. Leuci's books have sold in the US, France, Spain, England, Germany, and Croatia. He also participated at several writers' conferences in Europe. In 1999 he received the South County Center for the Arts Literary Prize. He was an adjunct professor of English and Political Science at the University of Rhode Island.

In 2020, a documentary about his life and his involvement in the SIU Corruption Investigation called Blue Code of Silence was released. It won several awards.

== Personal life ==
Leuci was married to Regina, a woman of Italian descent. They had two children, Anthony and Santina. They divorced in 1990. Leuci's daughter Santina is one of the producers of the 2024 documentary Manhunt: Luigi Mangione and the CEO Murder - A Special Edition of 20/20.

Leuci married Kathy Packard in 2003, after he had moved to Rhode Island to pursue his writing and teaching career. They lived in the Narragansett Bay region.

Leuci died on October 12, 2015, at the age of 75 after complications from surgery.

== Books ==
- All the Centurions ISBN 0-06-078185-8
- Blaze ISBN 0-380-79629-5
- Captain Butterfly ISBN 1-55921-253-5
- Doyle's Disciples ISBN 0-00-617256-3
- Double Edge ISBN 0-451-17332-5
- Fence Jumpers ISBN 1-55921-348-5
- Odessa Beach ISBN 1-55921-242-X
- The Snitch ISBN 0-312-14739-2
- Renegades ISBN 0-7472-5336-6

== TV ==
- 100 Centre Street (Writer). Episode name: "End of the Month"

== See also ==
- Adrian Schoolcraft
- Frank Serpico
