= Prince of the City =

1981 film by Sidney Lumet

- Theatrical release poster
- Directed by: Sidney Lumet
- Screenplay by: Sidney Lumet; Jay Presson Allen
- Based on: Prince of the City (1978 book) by Robert Daley
- Produced by: Burtt Harris
- Starring: Treat Williams; Jerry Orbach; Richard Foronjy; Lindsay Crouse; Bob Balaban; James Tolkan
- Cinematography: Andrzej Bartkowiak
- Edited by: Jack Fitzstephens
- Music by: Paul Chihara
- Production company: Orion Pictures
- Distributed by: Warner Bros.
- Release date: August 21, 1981
- Running time: 167 minutes
- Country: United States
- Language: English
- Budget: $8.6 million
- Box office: $8 million

Prince of the City is a 1981 American neo-noir crime drama film directed by Sidney Lumet. It is based on the life of Robert Leuci, called Daniel Ciello in the film, an officer of the New York Police Department who chooses, for idealistic reasons, to expose corruption in the force. (Note: After he quit the job, Leuci turned novelist and wrote the gritty police dramas Snitch, Odessa Beach and Captain Butterfly.) The screenplay, written by Lumet and Jay Presson Allen, is based on a 1978 non-fiction book by former NYPD Deputy Commissioner Robert Daley.

The film stars Treat Williams as Ciello, with a supporting cast featuring Jerry Orbach, Lindsay Crouse and Bob Balaban. Lumet had previously directed Serpico (1973), an award-winning film about corruption in the NYPD. In real life, that film's subject Frank Serpico was acquainted with Leuci and helped convince him to come forward.

Produced by Orion Pictures and distributed by Warner Bros., the film premiered on August 19, 1981. It received mixed-to-positive reviews from critics and was not a commercial success, but earned several accolades, including an Oscar nomination for Best Adapted Screenplay, and Golden Globe nominations for Best Motion Picture, Best Director for Lumet, and Best Actor for Treat Williams. It also earned the Pasinetti Prize at the 38th Venice International Film Festival.

== Plot ==
Danny Ciello is a narcotics detective who works in the Special Investigative Unit (SIU) of the NYPD. He and his fellow investigators are called "Princes of the City" because they are largely unsupervised and are given wide latitude to make cases against defendants. They are also involved in numerous illegal practices, such as skimming money from criminals and supplying informants with stolen drugs to resell.

Danny has a drug-addict brother and a cousin in organized crime. After an incident in which Danny beats a junkie to steal his heroin supply, his conscience begins to bother him. He is approached by internal affairs and federal prosecutors to participate in an investigation into police corruption. In exchange for potentially avoiding prosecution and gaining federal protection for himself and his family, Ciello wears a wire and goes undercover to expose other dirty cops. He agrees to cooperate as long as he does not have to turn in his partners, but his past misdeeds and criminal associates come back to haunt him.

One of his partners commits suicide during interrogation, and his cousin in the Mafia, who has aided Danny, winds up dead. While confessing to three crimes he committed in the SIU, Danny perjures himself by denying the many other offenses he and his partners have committed. Despite repeatedly professing loyalty, he finally gives up all of his partners, most of whom turn on him. In the end, the chief prosecutor decides not to prosecute Danny and he is reassigned to work as an instructor at the Police Academy.

== Cast ==
- Treat Williams as Detective Daniel Ciello
- Jerry Orbach as Detective Gus Levy
- Lindsay Crouse as Carla Ciello
- Bob Balaban as Special Assistant U.S. Attorney Christopher Santimassino
- Richard Foronjy as Detective Joe Marinaro
- Don Billett as Detective Bill Mayo
- Kenny Marino as Detective Dom Bando
- Carmine Caridi as Detective Gino Mascone
- Tony Page as Detective Raf Alvarez
- Norman Parker as Special Assistant U.S. Attorney Rick Cappalino
- Paul Roebling as Special Assistant U.S. Attorney Brooks Paige
- James Tolkan as District Attorney George Polito
- Steve Inwood as Assistant U.S. Attorney Mario Vincente
- Matthew Laurance as Ronnie Ciello
- Tony Turco as "Socks" Ciello
- Ron Maccone as Nick Napoli
- Ron Karabatsos as Dave DeBennedeto
- Tony DiBenedetto as Carl Alagretti
- Tony Munafo as Rocky Gazzo
- Robert Christian as "The King"
- Lee Richardson as Sam Heinsdorff
- Lane Smith as U.S. Marshal "Tug" Barnes
- Cosmo Allegretti as Marcel Sardino
- Bobby Alto as Mr. Kanter
- Michael Beckett as Michael Blomberg
- Burton Collins as Monty
- Carmine Foresta as Ernie Fallacci
- Conard Fowkes as Elroy Pendleton
- Peter Friedman as District Attorney Goldman
- Peter Michael Goetz as Attorney Charles Deluth
- Lance Henriksen as District Attorney Burano
- Eddie Jones as U.S. Marshal Ned Chippy
- Don Leslie as District Attorney D'Amato
- Dana Lorge as Ann Mascone
- Harry Madsen as Bubba Harris
- E.D. Miller as Sergeant Edelman
- Cynthia Nixon as Jeannie
- Ron Perkins as Virginia Trooper
- Lionel Pina as Sancho
- José Santana as José
- Alan King as Himself (uncredited)

== Production ==
=== Development and writing ===
Orion Pictures had bought Daley's book for $500,000 in 1978. Daley was a former New York Deputy Police Commissioner for Public Affairs who wrote about Robert Leuci, an NYPD detective whose testimony and secret tape recordings helped indict 52 members of the Special Investigation Unit and convict them of income tax evasion. Originally, Brian De Palma was going to direct with David Rabe adapting the book and Robert De Niro playing Leuci but the project fell through. Jay Presson Allen, who had read the book, had let it be known that she wanted the film for Sidney Lumet if that deal should fall through. Lumet came aboard to direct under two conditions: He did not want a big name movie star playing Leuci because he did not "want to spend two reels getting over past associations," and the movie's running time would be at least three hours.

Allen hadn't wanted to write Prince of the City, just produce it. She was put off by the book's non-linear story structure, but Lumet wouldn't make the picture without her, and agreed to write the outline for her. Lumet and Allen went over the book and agreed on what they could use and what they could do without. To her horror, Lumet would come in every day for weeks and scribble on legal pads. She was terrified that she would have to tell him that his stuff was unusable, but to her delight the outline was wonderful and she went to work. It was her first project with living subjects, and Allen interviewed nearly everyone in the book and had endless hours of Bob Leuci's tapes for back-up. With all her research and Lumet's outline, she eventually turned out a 365-page script in 10 days. It was nearly impossible to sell the studio on a three-hour picture, but by offering to slash the budget to $10 million they agreed. When asked if the original author ever has anything to say about how their book is treated, Allen replied: "Not if I can help it. You cannot open that can of worms. You sell your book, you go to the bank, you shut up."

=== Casting ===
Lumet cast Williams after spending three weeks talking to him and listening to the actor read the script and then reading it again with 50 other cast members. In order to research the role, the actor spent a month learning about police work, hung out at 23rd Precinct in New York City, went on a drug bust, and lived with Leuci for some time. By the time rehearsals started, Williams said "I was thinking like a cop." Lumet felt guilty about the two-dimensional way he had treated cops in the 1973 film Serpico and said that Prince of the City was his way to rectify this depiction.

Supposedly, Bruce Willis has a role as a background actor in this film, and Williams tipped him off about The Verdict, Lumet's next film.

=== Filming ===
Prince of the City was shot entirely on-location in New York City between March 10 and May 1980. Along with The Godfather (1972), this is the only major Hollywood movie to be shot in all five New York City boroughs (Brooklyn, Queens, the Bronx, Staten Island and Manhattan).

=== Music ===
The film score was composed by Paul Chihara. Due to a musician's union strike at the time, the score was recorded in Paris and conducted by Georges Delerue. Chihara:

"The symphonic orchestra was large (about 60 musicians) with a superb jazz saxophonist Pierre Gossez, who had often performed with major jazz greats, including Duke Ellington. Many of the musicians were from the Paris Opera Orchestra, who had just recorded the newly discovered third act of Alban Berg’s opera Lulu under Pierre Boulez. I could not have asked for a better, ideal orchestra or conductor for my score."

== Distribution ==
Orion opened the film in a select group of theaters to allow time for good reviews and word-of-mouth to build demand ahead of wider release. It could not afford television advertising, and relied heavily on print ads, including an unusual three-page spread in The New York Times.

== Reception ==
=== Critical reception ===
Upon its release, Prince of the City garnered mixed reviews, some of which complained about its excessive length, or unfavorably compared Williams' performance to Al Pacino's in Serpico, Lumet's previous film about police corruption. Roger Ebert of the Chicago Sun-Times called it "a very good movie and, like some of its characters, it wants to break your heart. Maybe it will." Janet Maslin of The New York Times praised its "sharply detailed landscape" and states that its "brief characterizations are so keenly drawn that dozens of them stand out with the forcefulness of major performances." She concludes that it "begins with the strength and confidence of a great film, and ends merely as a good one. The achievement isn't what it first promises to be, but it's exciting and impressive all the same."

The film was not commercially successful in theatres, earning only $8.1 million of its $8.6 million cost. Prince of the City holds a 93% approval rating on Rotten Tomatoes, based on 28 reviews with an average rating of 7.5/10. On Metacritic, it has a score of 81% based on reviews from 15 critics.

The film was praised by Akira Kurosawa.

=== Response from subjects ===
The film was considered sufficiently authentic by the head of the Drug Enforcement Administration (DEA) that he called Lumet for a copy of the movie to use for the DEA training. Some law-enforcement officials, however, criticized the film for glamorizing Leuci and other corrupt detectives while portraying most of the prosecutors who uncovered the crimes negatively. John Guido, Chief of Inspectional Services, said, "The corrupt guys are the only good guys in the film."

Nicholas Scoppetta, the Special Prosecutor who helped convince Leuci to go undercover against his fellow officers (depicted as 'Rick Cappalino' in the film), said, "In the film, it seems to be the prosecutors who are disregarding the issue of where real justice lies and the prosecutors seem to be as bad or worse than the corrupt police." In fact, only two of the five prosecutors the film focuses on were portrayed negatively. In particular, District Attorney Polito, played by James Tolkan, is shown as petty and vindictive. The character is based on Thomas Puccio, the assistant United States Attorney in charge of the Federal Organized Crime Strike Force in Brooklyn, and Robert Daley agrees that he was treated unfairly in the screenplay.

One of the prosecutors who befriended the Ciello character and is shown in a very positive light was based on then rookie federal prosecutor Rudy Giuliani. The character, Mario Vincente (played by Steve Inwood) is portrayed as threatening to resign if the U.S. Attorney's office indicts Ciello (Leuci) for past transgressions. In general, the prosecutors who argued against the prosecution of Leuci are treated sympathetically, while those who sought his indictment are shown as officious and vindictive.

=== Awards and nominations ===
Institution	Year	Category	Nominee	Result
Academy Award	1982	Best Adapted Screenplay	Sidney Lumet, Jay Presson Allen	Nominated
Edgar Award	1982	Best Motion Picture Screenplay	Sidney Lumet, Jay Presson Allen	Nominated
Golden Globe Award	1982	Best Motion Picture – Drama		Nominated
Golden Globe Award	1982	Best Director	Sidney Lumet	Nominated
Golden Globe Award	1982	Best Actor – Motion Picture Drama	Treat Williams	Nominated
Kansas City Film Critics Circle	1981	Best Director	Sidney Lumet	Won
National Board of Review	1981	Top Ten Films		6th place
National Society of Film Critics	1982	Best Film		3rd place
National Society of Film Critics	1982	Best Director	Sidney Lumet	Nominated
National Society of Film Critics	1982	Best Screenplay	Sidney Lumet, Jay Presson Allen	Nominated
National Society of Film Critics	1982	Best Supporting Actor	Jerry Orbach	Nominated
New York Film Critics Circle	1981	Best Film		Nominated
New York Film Critics Circle	1981	Best Director	Sidney Lumet	Won
New York Film Critics Circle	1981	Best Screenplay	Sidney Lumet, Jay Presson Allen	Nominated
New York Film Critics Circle	1981	Best Supporting Actor	Jerry Orbach	Nominated
Stinkers Bad Movie Award	1981	Worst Actor	Treat Williams	Nominated
Venice Film Festival	1981	Golden Lion	Sidney Lumet	Nominated
Venice Film Festival	1981	Pasinetti Prize	Sidney Lumet	Won
Writers Guild of America	1982	Best Adapted Screenplay	Sidney Lumet, Jay Presson Allen	Nominated
