= Joseph Gray (police officer) =

New York City Police Department officer

Joseph Gray is a former New York City Police Department officer who killed three pedestrians and the unborn child of one of them (who died after being delivered by emergency Caesarean procedure) on August 4, 2001, while driving drunk in Brooklyn. It was later discovered that other officers had been drinking with Gray in a topless bar and at a precinct parking lot before the incident. Five officers were suspended and five were transferred, including the precinct's commanding officer, executive officer and integrity control officer. The two officers who were on probation at the time were ultimately dismissed.

The New York Times cited the incident as an example of the blue wall of silence, "the tradition of the police lying or looking the other way to protect their own", because of the attempts of some of Gray's colleagues to get him off. The New York Times compared the incident to the testimony of Frank Serpico and the assault of Abner Louima. According to Professor Jerome Skolnick at New York University Law School, "The blue wall is still an issue, and it's not surprising that sort of behavior would take place around drinking, which is seen as a kind of a venial sin. It is so widespread that cops are most likely to cover up for one another on that issue."

== Incident ==
On Saturday August 4, 2001, at 9 p.m. Gray was speeding through a red light on Third Avenue under the Gowanus Expressway with his minivan when he struck pregnant Maria Herrera, 24, her son Andy, 4, and her sister Dilcia Peña, 16, who were crossing a street in Sunset Park, Brooklyn, killing them instantly. Herrera was eight and a half months pregnant; her unborn child was delivered in an emergency Caesarean procedure but did not survive.

Gray was traveling 15 mph (24 km/h) over the 30 mph (48 km/h) speed limit. He had a blood-alcohol level of 0.23%, nearly three times the legal limit. He was off duty at the time of the incident. Four officers had been drinking with Gray at the Wild Wild West topless bar, which was listed as off-limits to officers of the 72nd precinct. Gray had drunk 12 to 18 beers in the previous 12 hours.

Before the paramedics arrived, Gray told witness Freddy Roman, "Come on, man, we all have a few beers once in a while."

Gray was released without bail on the Sunday after his arraignment, sparking outrage among the victim's families, and many New Yorkers. Mayor Rudy Giuliani stated that he "should have been held on high bail whether he was or he wasn't a police officer. Everybody should be held to an extremely high standard when it comes to drunk driving."

== Trial ==
Gray was convicted of four counts of second-degree manslaughter and sentenced to five to 15 years in prison. The sentence left Gray eligible for parole in five years. The jury convicted Gray of second-degree manslaughter, rather than the less serious offenses of vehicular manslaughter and negligent homicide, which were also submitted to them. Gray was denied parole for the third time in February 2011, after having spent 10 years in prison. The parole board determined that Gray's release was "incompatible with the welfare and safety of the community," and that there was a "reasonable probability" that Gray would violate the law again if released. He was paroled in 2012, with conditions including that he was banned from drinking alcohol and was required to attend DWI and child protection courses, and would remain on supervised release until 2017. After his release, he was hired as a school custodian on Staten Island.

== Investigation of police misconduct ==
Gray was arrested by officers from his own precinct. The responding highway officer failed to fill out portions of the accident report. Photographs taken at the crime scene "mysteriously turned out to be blank". At the trial, an accident investigator testified that union representatives asked him which sobriety test Gray would be most likely to "beat". The police chemist failed to turn over 60 pages of reports on Gray's blood alcohol content as required by law, and several other pieces of evidence were temporarily misplaced. The investigator, after he retired, admitted that he had sought to give Gray a "benefit" because of his status as a police officer. Gray was not handcuffed in the squad car or detention room.

After Gray's conviction, the district attorney launched an "investigation into police misconduct in this case, specifically for obstruction of governmental administration and hindering prosecution." The issue had been raised even during the trial, when the "exasperated prosecutor, speaking in open court, voiced his unhappiness with the handling of the case by officers".

Officer Michael J. Immitt, the union official, had also been involved in the Louima case, where he had also been accused of misconduct by prosecutors. In the obstruction trial for that case, Immitt admitted that he told officers to "sit tight" and "don't talk about it".

== Civil settlement ==
The city paid US$1.5 million to surviving family members to settle a civil lawsuit stemming from the incident, reported on May 16, 2006. The family members were represented by Johnnie Cochran and Derek Sells.

== Legacy ==
150 people gathered at the site of the incident on the first anniversary of the deaths. The playground next to the site has been renamed Herrera-Peña Park.

Rapper Talib Kweli mentions the incident in his song "The Proud" from the album Quality (2002):

August 4, 2001

A drunken police officer mows down an entire family in Brooklyn
The judge lets him go with no bail
It reminds us, of just how worthless our lives are to the justice system

I struggle, to explain the situation to my son, it's hard
