= Night Falls on Manhattan =

1996 American crime drama film

- Theatrical release poster
- Directed by: Sidney Lumet
- Written by: Sidney Lumet
- Based on: Tainted Evidence by Robert Daley
- Produced by: Thom Mount; Josh Kramer; John Starke
- Starring: Andy García; Richard Dreyfuss; Lena Olin; Ian Holm; James Gandolfini; Colm Feore; Ron Leibman
- Cinematography: David Watkin
- Edited by: Sam O'Steen
- Music by: Mark Isham
- Production company: Spelling Films
- Distributed by: Paramount Pictures (United States and France); Spelling Films International (International)
- Release dates: October 18, 1996 (United Kingdom); May 16, 1997 (United States)
- Running time: 113 minutes
- Country: United States
- Language: English
- Box office: $10 million

Night Falls on Manhattan is a 1996 American crime drama film written and directed by Sidney Lumet. Based on the novel Tainted Evidence by Robert Daley, the plot centers on a newly elected district attorney played by Andy García, who is eager to stamp out corruption within the New York City Police Department. Ian Holm, James Gandolfini, Lena Olin, Ron Leibman, and Richard Dreyfuss feature in principal supporting roles.

Theatrically distributed by Paramount Pictures in the United States on May 16, 1997 as a co-production with Spelling Films, Night Falls on Manhattan explores criminal law, political corruption, and the repercussions of violence. Following its initial release, it failed to garner any awards from mainstream organizations for its lead acting or production merits.

The film grossed nearly $10 million in domestic ticket receipts, and was met with mixed to positive critical reviews.

== Plot ==
NYPD detectives Liam Casey and Joey Allegretto, assigned to the 74th Precinct, are conducting surveillance against notorious drug dealer Jordan Washington. On a tip from an informant, they venture into an apartment block where Jordan is reportedly hiding. After Liam shoots the lock, he is heavily wounded when Jordan fires a submachine gun through his front door. Backup units alerted by Joey arrive and swarm the building, but Jordan cunningly escapes in a squad car after killing two policemen surnamed Finney and Katz with a silenced pistol, while a third policeman named Charlie perishes when a car's tire hits a rock and the other policemen present misinterpret the sound as a gunshot, subsequently firing towards the roof at him. Surprisingly, District Attorney Morgenstern appoints Liam's son Sean, a former NYPD officer and recently appointed ADA, to prosecute Jordan upon his capture, consequently passing over the more experienced ADA Elihu Harrison, who plans to oppose him in an upcoming election.

At Jordan's trial, his attorney, Sam Vigoda, confirms his client was responsible for the killings but argues that police were intending to murder him. On the witness stand, Jordan claims that he had been bribing a group of corrupt cops, led by Kurt Kleinhoff, in return for protection while dealing drugs, while Sam conversely argues that Jordan became a target when he refused to match an offer by a rival dealer, Carlos Alvarez, to give the cops more money. Although inexperienced, Sean mounts a strong argument questioning Jordan's credibility and wins the case. Jordan is convicted and sentenced to consecutive life terms without parole. A member of Sam's legal team, Peggy Lindstrom, begins an affair with Sean afterwards. Sam privately discloses to Sean why he defended Jordan: after his 15-year-old daughter died from a drug overdose, he has been determined to bring down the system of corrupt police enabling drug dealers.

Morgenstern suffers a severe heart attack after announcing his intention to run for re-election, and per his recommendation, the Mayor of New York City asks Sean to run in his place on the party's ticket; he wins the election over Harrison. Meanwhile, Kurt's decomposed corpse is discovered in the East River near a maritime dock, with his address book revealing the names of several officers from the 64th, 65th and 74th Precincts, all of which responded to the shooting. During several interrogations, a number of officers confess their entanglement in the bribery and narcotics scandal. Sean confronts Joey, who admits that he initially lied about his involvement with Kurt and was accepting bribes while also colluding to murder Jordan with fellow corrupt officers, and berates him for his past conduct. A depressed Joey later commits suicide in his car. Liam later discloses to Sean that he forged a judge's signature on Jordan's arrest warrant, as the original had expired on the day of the raid. Sean asks Morgenstern, who is recovering in a rehabilitative hospital, about how to handle the scandal. Morgenstern replies that being the DA will undoubtedly be tough, but he confidently believes Sean will do a better job than most people will.

When Liam voluntarily admits guilt about the forgery in a private consultation, Judge Dominick Impelliteri decides to fill out a new warrant, backdated to the day of the raid, which purposely obviates the technicality. He also suggests to Sean that he destroy the forged warrant. Sean tells Sam that he plans to resign, but Sam urges him not to quit, admitting that his motives were to expose police corruption only and that Jordan should remain in jail regardless of the fake warrant's origins. Some time later, while giving the introductory lecture for a new class of ADAs, urging them to approach their job with diligence and integrity, Sean reveals that Liam has recently retired from the NYPD.

== Cast ==
- Andy García as Sean Casey
- Richard Dreyfuss as Sam Vigoda
- Lena Olin as Peggy Lindstrom
- Ian Holm as Liam Casey
- James Gandolfini as Joey Allegretto
- Colm Feore as Elihu Harrison
- Shiek Mahmud-Bey as Jordan Washington
- Jude Ciccolella as Lieutenant Wilson
- Paul Guilfoyle as McGovern
- Dominic Chianese as Judge Impelliteri
- Marcia Jean Kurtz as Eileen (as Marcia J. Kurtz)
- Ron Leibman as Morgenstern

In addition, television newspeople working in New York City at the time – Bill Boggs, Donna Hanover and Kaity Tong – had cameos as television newspeople.

== Production ==
=== Filming ===
Exterior film shooting took place primarily on location in New York City. Filming sets included the Hotel Pennsylvania, the Sherry Netherland Hotel, Bellevue Hospital Center, and the National Arts Club. The opening scene involving the police shootout with Washington, took place in a desolate apartment building in Harlem. Principal photography for the film began on October 11, 1995, and was completed on December 12. The screenplay for the film written by director Lumet, was based on the novel Tainted Evidence authored by Robert Daley.

According to Lumet, a secondary inspiration for the plot was the true story surrounding the criminal Larry Davis, who escaped arrest from the scene of a drug raid. In the ensuing chaos, Davis shot six NYPD officers and eluded capture for 17 days. The character of Vigoda played by Richard Dreyfuss was patterned after attorney William Kunstler, who defended Davis. The scene of Washington's escape using an NYPD patrol car was staged for dramatic effect. Davis managed to escape the crime scene, but without the use of an actual police car.

=== Music ===
The original motion picture soundtrack for Night Falls on Manhattan was originally not officially released to the public, but features songs composed by veteran musician Wynton Marsalis. The music for the film was orchestrated by Mark Isham, edited by Annette Kudrak and mixed by Stephen Krause, at Capital Studios. The sound effects in the film were supervised by Ron Bochar. The editing of the sound elements was arranged by Glenfield Payne.

A limited release score album was released by La La Land Records in 2026; the album also included the score for the film Varsity Blues.

== Release ==
The film was given a wide release, in 758 theatres, on May 16, 1997.

== Home media ==
Following its cinematic release in theaters, the film was released in VHS video format on May 5, 1998. The Region 1 Code widescreen edition of the film was released on DVD in the United States on November 17, 1998. Special features for the DVD include; the original theatrical trailer, audio commentary with director Sidney Lumet, actors Andy García and Ron Leibman as well as with producers Josh Kramer and Thom Mount. The disc also includes interactive menus with scene selection. The film was given a Blu-ray Disc release by Australian distributor Imprint Films on August 26, 2020.

== Reception ==
=== Critical response ===
On the review aggregator website Rotten Tomatoes, 72% of 32 critics' reviews are positive, with an average rating of 6.8/10. Metacritic, which uses a weighted average, assigned the film a score of 60 out of 100, based on 19 critics, indicating "mixed or average" reviews. Audiences polled by CinemaScore gave the film an average grade of "B" on an A+ to F scale.

Janet Maslin writing in The New York Times, said director Lumet did "a good job of articulating the disillusioning realities of careerism and crime. And he has an ear, as ever, for the disparate voices of the city." She also casually noted that actor Garcia remained "a polite, neutral presence" through "too many moments, particularly during courtroom scenes that have been edited in awkwardly abrupt ways". Roger Ebert in the Chicago Sun-Times referred to the film as "knowledgeable about the city and the people who make accommodations with it. It shows us how boring that obligatory evil kingpin is in so many other crime movies". He explained, it comprises "characters who do wrong and are therefore bad, but it doesn't really have 'villains' in the usual movie sense of the word. It's too smart and grown up for such lazy categories".

In the San Francisco Chronicle, Peter Stack wrote that "The film's setup is intense, full of fearsome action, a pulse-pumper. But soon it becomes a thinking man's police drama about the political aftermath of the botched drug-lord case." Left unmoved, he declared that although "Lumet and his fine cast play it out in a moody, hard-boiled style, Night Falls on Manhattan falls flat. Owen Gleiberman of Entertainment Weekly, said the film unfolds "less in the gritty world of New York law enforcement than in the implausible tabloid imagination of Robert Daley, on whose pulp novel the film is based." In a slightly negative tone, Barbara Shulgasser of the San Francisco Examiner thought Lumet's "seriousness and simplicity with which he approaches his subject in Night Falls on Manhattan are refreshing even if the vivacity of the thing never really has a chance to develop."

Not entirely enthusiastic about certain elements of the plot was Andy Klein writing for the Dallas Observer. He flatly wrote, "As satisfying as much of the film is, there are a few missteps, large and small, that may require indulgence on the part of viewers." On an entirely negative front, Russell Smith of The Austin Chronicle remarked that "Lumet and Daley simply appear to have forgotten everything they once knew about lean, reality-based storytelling—a fact that no amount of bluster, superstar charisma, and stylistic virtuosity can conceal." Smith added, "Expected story developments fail to materialize, and others drop from the blue sky with no apparent rationale."

=== Box office ===
In the United States and Canada, Night Falls on Manhattan grossed $9.9 million at the box office. It opened at its box office peak, No. 7, and spent its first three weeks in the Top 10.

== See also ==
- Robert Daley

== Bibliography ==
- Daley, Robert (1994). Tainted Evidence. Vision. ISBN 978-0-446-60083-5.
- Schmalleger, Frank (1997). Crime and the Justice System in America: An Encyclopedia. Greenwood Press. ISBN 978-0-313-29409-9.
- Samaha, Joel (2005). Criminal Justice. Wadsworth Publishing. ISBN 978-1-111-34832-8.
