= Adrian Schoolcraft =

American police officer and whistleblower (born 1976)

- Born: 1976 (age 49–50); Killeen, Texas, U.S.
- Police career
- Department: New York City Police Department
- Service years: 2002–2015
- Rank: Police Officer
- Badge no.: 12943
- Awards: Meritorious Police Duty Medal
- Military career
- Allegiance: United States of America
- Branch: United States Navy
- Service years: 1993–1997
- Rank: Hospital Corpsman
- Unit: USS Blue Ridge
- Awards: National Defense Service Medal, Good Conduct Medal

Adrian Schoolcraft (born 1976) is a former New York City Police Department (NYPD) officer who secretly recorded police conversations from 2008 to 2009. He brought these tapes to NYPD investigators in October 2009 as evidence of corruption and wrongdoing within the department. The tapes were used as evidence of arrest quotas leading to police abuses such as wrongful arrests, and that emphasis on fighting crime sometimes resulted in under-reporting of crimes to artificially deflate CompStat numbers.

After voicing his concerns, Schoolcraft was repeatedly harassed by members of the NYPD and reassigned to a desk job. After he left work early one day, an ESU unit illegally entered his apartment and he was physically abducted and forcibly committed to a psychiatric facility, where he was held against his will for six days. In 2010, he released the audio recordings to The Village Voice, leading to the reporting of a multi-part series titled The NYPD Tapes. The same year, Schoolcraft filed a lawsuit against Jamaica Hospital and the NYPD. In 2012 The Village Voice reported that a 2010 unpublished report of an internal NYPD investigation found that the 81st precinct had evidence of quotas and underreporting. Both of Schoolcraft's claims were settled in 2015, with him receiving $600,000 for the NYPD portion of the lawsuit.

== Biography ==
Adrian Schoolcraft was born in Killeen, Texas, in 1976. His father was a police officer. Schoolcraft joined the United States Navy at age 17 and served for four years (1993–1997) on the USS Blue Ridge in Japan. He was awarded the National Defense Service Medal, the Good Conduct Medal, and other decorations while on active duty. He was honorably discharged in 1997 and returned to Texas to work for Motorola.

In 2002 he moved to New York City, wishing to be closer to his parents (who had moved to New York state), particularly because his mother had been diagnosed with cancer. Driven both by his mother's desire that he become an officer, and by a wish to respond to the September 11 attacks on New York City, he applied to join the NYPD. He passed the entrance exam and joined the force two weeks later.

Soon after joining the force, Schoolcraft was deployed to Precinct 75 in Brooklyn to join Operation Impact. After 14 months in the NYPD, he was transferred to Precinct 81 in Bedford–Stuyvesant. After a few years on the force, he began to raise issues about understaffing and overtime, saying that the precinct had too few officers to do a good job.

He received the Meritorious Police Duty Medal in 2006, and in 2008 was cited for his "dedication to the New York City Police Department and to the City of New York". Brooklynites who lived in the area patrolled by Schoolcraft reported that he was the only officer they knew, because he was the only one interested in conversing with them.

== Recordings ==
Schoolcraft began recording his conversations in order to respond to public complaints. He said, "I worked in a black community, you can think of the word I was accused of using". He subsequently decided to also record police conversations.

Between 1 June 2008 and 15 October 2009, Schoolcraft recorded conversations at the 81st Precinct police station, responsible for the Bedford–Stuyvesant neighborhood of Brooklyn, New York City. Schoolcraft amassed a set of tapes which demonstrated corruption and abuse within New York City's 81st Police Precinct.

The tapes include conversations related to the issues of arrest quotas and investigations. Schoolcraft says an overemphasis on arrests leads to wrongful arrests and bad police work. A recording from 31 October 2009 includes precinct commander Steven Mauriello ordering a raid on 120 Chauncy Street: "Everybody goes. I don't care. You're on 120 Chauncey and they're popping champagne? Yoke 'em. Put them through the system. They got bandanas on, arrest them. Everybody goes tonight. They're underage? Fuck it." He orders: "Bring 'em in. Lodge them. You're going to go back out and process it later on."

== Disclosure ==
Schoolcraft was harassed, particularly in 2009, after he began to voice his concerns within the precinct. He was told he needed to increase arrest numbers and received a bad evaluation. The next day, he found a paper in his locker reading: "If you don't like your job, maybe you should get another job."

Schoolcraft reports that the Department directed him toward psychological treatment rather than taking his concerns seriously. When he discussed issues like understaffing and stop-and-frisk with NYPD psychologist Catherine Lamstein, she directed him to surrender his weapons. Schoolcraft was reassigned to a desk job.

In October 2009, Schoolcraft disclosed his allegations to NYPD investigators in a meeting that he understood was to be confidential. He discussed underreporting of crimes and bureaucratic hassles for people who tried to report crimes. His father contacted David Durk, a retired detective who became famous working on similar issues (of NYPD corruption) with whistleblower Frank Serpico. Durk contacted an officer in NYPD's Internal Affairs Bureau. On 27 October Schoolcraft was placed under "forced monitoring".

On 31 October, Lt. Timothy Caughey confiscated Schoolcraft's memo book, which contained descriptions of Schoolcraft's conclusions. Later Schoolcraft's immediate superior, Rasheena Huffman, said that the Department had made copies of his notes.

=== Raid and involuntary commitment ===
By the end of his 31 October shift, Schoolcraft felt sick and intimidated. With permission from Huffman, he left the station an hour early, went home, took some Nyquil, and fell asleep. At 6 PM, his father called with a warning message. He looked out the window and saw police massing in the street. He stayed on the phone. After 9 PM, he heard people moving upstairs. The officers obtained a key to the apartment after telling the landlord that Schoolcraft was suicidal.

Schoolcraft turned on two tape recorders before the officers entered, and the subsequent interaction was recorded. About twelve high-ranking officers were present. Schoolcraft was interrogated by Deputy Chief Michael Marino, who asked: "Adrian... you didn't hear us knocking on that door?" Schoolcraft said no and after further questions said, "Chief, if you were woken up in your house how would you behave? What is this, Russia?" The two argued about whether Schoolcraft's early departure from the station was authorized, and whether he would return to the station with the team.

Schoolcraft agreed to check into a nearby hospital (Forest Hills) for high blood pressure. When paramedics said they were taking him to Jamaica Hospital, he said he was refusing medical attention ("RMA"). Chief Marino said:

Listen to me, they are going to treat you like an EDP [emotionally disturbed person]. Now, you have a choice. You get up like a man and put your shoes on and walk into that bus, or they're going to treat you as an EDP and that means handcuffs.

Marino eventually ordered, "Just take him. I can't f------ stand him anymore." The police found and confiscated one tape recorder, but the other one kept rolling.

Schoolcraft was involuntarily committed to a psychiatric ward in Jamaica Hospital Medical Center. He was handcuffed tightly to a bed and prevented from using a telephone, by orders of police who were present. An officer told the hospital that police had "followed him home and he had barricaded himself, and the door had to be broken to get to him".

Schoolcraft's father eventually located and retrieved his son. The family received a medical bill of $7,185.

The hospital's report states:

He is coherent, relevant with goal directed speech and good eye contact. ... His memory and concentration is intact. He is alert and oriented [... but] his insight and judgment are impaired. ... He expressed questionable paranoid ideas of conspiracy and cover-ups going [on] in the precinct. Since then, he started collecting 'evidence' to 'prove his point' and became suspicious 'They are after him.'

After discharge, Schoolcraft was suspended from the force and stopped receiving a paycheck. Police officers visited his house regularly in the following weeks.

=== "The NYPD Tapes" ===
In 2010, Schoolcraft released his recordings to The Village Voice; its reporter Graham Rayman published them as a series of articles titled "The NYPD Tapes", together with material on Schoolcraft. The suspended officer also discussed the case and his recordings with the Associated Press, which published a lengthy article, including excerpts from the recordings. The New York Times reported Schoolcraft's allegations that "commanders at the 81st Precinct pushed ticket and arrest quotas on officers".

In the analysis of Graham Rayman, writing for the Voice, this pressure to arrest had major effects in the 81st precinct, including:

- A ninefold increase in "stop-and-frisk" events.
- "... several dozen gun arrests, hundreds of arrests on other charges, and thousands of summonses for things like disorderly conduct, trespassing, and loitering."
- Arrests on trivial charges, such as a person not displaying identification several feet away from their own house. ("Mental health worker Rhonda Scott suffered two broken wrists during a 2008 arrest for not having her ID card while standing on her own stoop.")
- Entire groups of people arrested without charges, simply for congregating on street corners. (These group arrests were often ordered directly by precinct commander Steven Mauriello and became known as "Mauriello specials".)
- A functional 8:30 PM curfew: "After 8:30, it's all on me and my officers, and we're undermanned", Mauriello was recorded as saying. "The good people go inside. The others stay outside."
- "Ghost 250s", fake stop-and-frisk reports with no names, fabricated to make quota at the end of the month.
- A preference for easy arrests, rather than "bag of shit" cases who require supervision or medical treatment. One sergeant said: "Listen, don't bring Mr. Medicine into the stationhouse, because he's going to get free medical care from us that we all pay for, OK, and plus then he gets a nice police escort the whole time that he's there."

Rayman quotes retired NYPD detective Marquez Claxton: "The Police Department is using these numbers to portray themselves as being effective. In portraying that illusion, they have pushed these illegal quotas which force police officers to engage in illegal acts." Rayman said the aggressive tactics were related to understaffing on the force. He wrote: "a typical day in the 81st Precinct had only three to nine officers patrolling the streets in an area of more than 60,000 people". Understaffing also led officers to work more overtime hours, earning more money but also becoming emotionally and physically exhausted.

In 2011 Rayman's NYPD Tapes series won a "Gold Keyboard" award, the highest honor, from the New York Press Club.

On September 10, 2010, the nationally syndicated radio program This American Life ran a story on Schoolcraft, using his recorded material as well as interviews with him personally. The New York Times had been covering the story as well.

== Further developments ==
In August 2010 Schoolcraft filed a lawsuit against the NYPD, claiming that they both intimidated and retaliated against him. The action sought $50,000,000 in damages. He said his four-day involuntary hospitalization in Jamaica Hospital Center's psychiatric ward was ordered to "discredit his allegations". Schoolcraft has stated that: "There's not enough money in the state to get me to settle this suit. It's going to trial and there's no way around that – the truth has to come out."

Schoolcraft alleged in the lawsuit that NYPD spokesperson Paul Browne was present at the raid on October 31; Browne was a "top aide" to Police Commissioner Raymond Kelly. According to the Village Voice: "If proven true, Browne's presence at Schoolcraft's home on Oct. 31, 2009 suggests that Commissioner Kelly was aware of the decision by Deputy Chief Michael Marino to order Schoolcraft handcuffed and dragged from his own apartment just three weeks after he reported police misconduct to the unit which audits NYPD crime statistics."

In May 2011, U.S. District Court Judge Robert Sweet ruled that discovery could proceed.

In March 2012, The Village Voice published an article discussing an unpublished report from June 2010 of the NYPD internal investigation of Schoolcraft's case, which vindicated him, finding evidence of quotas and underreporting of crimes. The New York Times also discussed the case, saying that the report concluded there was "a concerted effort to deliberately underreport crime in the 81st Precinct".

In 2013, a related "Stop-And-Frisk" case went to trial in federal court.

In May 2015, federal judge Robert Sweet ruled that the case could proceed to trial.

In September 2015, the portion of the lawsuit against the NYPD settled, with Schoolcraft to receive $600,000 in compensation. The portion against Jamaica Hospital was settled confidentially in November 2015.

== In popular culture ==
In September 2010, popular podcast This American Life profiled Adrian Schoolcraft in an episode titled "Right to Remain Silent".

Incidents relating to former NYPD officer Adrian Schoolcraft, in particular his unjustified hospitalisation, formed the basis of an episode of popular police drama Law and Order: Special Victims Unit, Episode 4 of Season 15 entitled "Internal Affairs", which aired on October 9, 2013.

In March 2015, a team of filmmakers at the Savannah College of Art and Design began production on a short film entitled Schoolcraft. According to Edinburgh's Nightpiece Film Festival, where the film premiered in August 2015, the film is "based on the true story of former NYPD beat cop Adrian Schoolcraft" and "director Adam Nelson presents a carefully observed social drama and studious examination of recent corruption amongst New York's finest". The short film was nominated for a Student Academy Award and was overwhelmingly well received at the Denver Film Festival, Savannah Film Festival, and others.

CompStat and the case of Schoolcraft is also discussed in the episodes "The Crime Machine" (part 1 & 2) of the podcast Reply All, a show about the internet.

== See also ==
- Frank Serpico
- Knapp Commission
- Mollen Commission
- Political abuse of psychiatry in the United States
- Robert Leuci
