= Robert Daley =

American police officer and writer (1930–2026)

- Born: Robert Daley Blake; May 10, 1930; New York City, New York, U.S.
- Died: May 26, 2026 (aged 96); The Bronx, New York City, New York, U.S.
- Education: Fordham University
- Occupations: Writer, author, journalist, police officer
- Writing career
- Language: English
- Genres: Journalism, fiction, crime, non-fiction
- Notable works: Prince of the City; Year of the Dragon

Robert Blake Daley (May 10, 1930 – May 26, 2026) was an American writer, journalist and New York City Police Department officer. He was the author of 31 books, six of which have been adapted for film, and a hundred or so magazine articles and stories.

== Life and career ==
Daley was born in New York City on May 10, 1930, graduated from Fordham University in 1951 and served in the Air Force during the Korean War. He spent six seasons as publicity director for the New York Giants of the National Football League in the days of Frank Gifford, Charlie Conerly, and Sam Huff. He then worked on the foreign staff of The New York Times for six years based first in Nice, then in Paris, covering stories in sixteen countries in Europe and North Africa.

Between 1971 and 1972, he served as Deputy Commissioner of the New York City Police Department (NYPD). It was a particularly tumultuous period in the department's history: two Mafia dons were killed, the city's biggest-ever jewel heist took place, the Knapp Commission investigation into police corruption caused great upheaval in the department, and four police officers were assassinated by gunmen who claimed to be associated with the Black Liberation Army. Two others were machine-gunned in their car, riddled with bullets but did not die. He had a staff of thirty five, a car and drivers assigned to him around the clock. He witnessed headquarters infighting up close, took part in major decision-making, and saw crime scenes from inside the yellow tape. Daley recounted these events and others in the nonfiction book Target Blue, and he used the police background and his inside knowledge of police headquarters in a number of the novels that followed as well. He was the first professional writer ever to see the NYPD from so deep inside, and said later that when he agreed to take the job, he got more than he bargained for.

Daley's award-winning 1978 nonfiction work Prince of the City about NYPD detective Robert Leuci was hailed by The New York Times Book Review: "The policeman as flawed hero, a recurrent and enormously popular figure in contemporary writing, has never been done better." Prince was one a six of Daley's books adapted from TV or into movies. Daley's books, which have been translated into 14 languages, also include Year of the Dragon and Tainted Evidence (filmed as Night Falls on Manhattan). Most of his books grew out of immersing himself deeply in studying people and subjects that fascinated him, from Grand Prix racing to opera to bullfights to treasure diving—and of course the NYPD. He and his French-born wife, Peggy, divided their time between suburban New York and an apartment in Nice, France. They had three daughters.

Daley died at a hospital in The Bronx, New York City, on May 26, 2026, at the age of 96.

== Works ==
=== Novels ===
- The Whole Truth (1967)
- Only a Game (1967)
- A Priest and a Girl (1969)
- Strong Wine, Red as Blood (1975)
- To Kill a Cop (1976) - filmed for TV in 1978; followed by the 1979 TV series Eischied
- The Fast One (1978)
- Year of the Dragon (1981) - filmed by Michael Cimino in 1985
- The Dangerous Edge (1983)
- Hands of a Stranger (1985) - filmed by Larry Elikann in 1987
- Man with a Gun (1988)
- A Faint Cold Fear (1990)
- Tainted Evidence (1993) - filmed by Sidney Lumet as Night Falls on Manhattan in 1996
- Wall of Brass (1994)
- Nowhere to Run (1996)
- The Innocents Within (1999)
- The Enemy of God (2005)
- Pictures (2006)
- The Red Squad (2012)

=== Non-fiction ===
- The World Beneath the City (1959)
- Cars at Speed (1961)
- The Bizarre World of European Sports (1962)
- The Cruel Sport (1963)
- The Swords of Spain (1965)
- A Star in the Family (1971)
- Target Blue: An Insider's View of the N.Y.P.D. (1973)
- Treasure (1977)
- Prince of the City: The True Story of a Cop Who Knew Too Much (1978) - filmed by Sidney Lumet in 1981
- An American Saga - Juan Trippe and his Pan Am Empire (1980)
- Portraits of France (1991)
- Writing on the Edge (2014)

== Poetry ==
- MORE And Other Poems (2018)
