= Eischied =

1979 American crime drama TV series

- Genre: Crime drama
- Based on: To Kill a Cop by Robert Daley
- Developed by: Ernest Tidyman
- Written by: Stephen Downing; Ernest Tidyman
- Directed by: Gary Nelson
- Starring: Joe Don Baker; Eddie Egan; Alan Fudge; Alan Oppenheimer; Suzanne Lederer; Vincent Bufano
- Theme music composer: John Cacavas
- Composer: Charles R. Cassey
- Country of origin: United States
- Original language: English
- No. of seasons: 1
- No. of episodes: 13

Production
- Executive producer: David Gerber
- Producers: Matthew Rapf; Jay Daniel
- Camera setup: Single-camera
- Running time: 45–48 minutes
- Production companies: David Gerber Productions; Columbia Pictures Television

Original release
- Network: NBC
- Release: September 21, 1979 – July 1, 1980

Related
- To Kill a Cop (1978)

Eischied (/ˈaɪʃaɪd/, EYE-shide) is an American crime drama television series that aired on NBC from September 21, 1979, to July 1, 1980. It was based on the starring character from the 1978 miniseries To Kill a Cop, which was based on the 1976 novel by Robert Daley.

The show was broadcast in the United Kingdom under the title Chief of Detectives. In West Germany the show ran in 1980 under the title Schauplatz New York ("Location: New York").

== Synopsis ==
The series stars Joe Don Baker as tough, brilliant, southern-bred New York City Police Department Chief of Detectives Earl Eischied. His complimentary catchphrase was "Ya done good," which was usually directed at one of the younger detectives or officers in his command. His pet cat was named "PC" (as in "police commissioner"). Eischied was tough and did not hesitate to work the streets with his detectives. He used a Smith & Wesson Model 10 .38 Special, snub-nosed revolver, which he carried "old school" style, inside his waistband, concealed by his vest and/or suit jacket. He was not afraid to bend the rules in pursuit of a case, but would never break the law. His southern drawl concealed a sharp intellect and encyclopedic knowledge of criminology and police work. Although Eischied was physically imposing, he had great empathy and compassion for victims of crime and others less fortunate.

NBC reran all 13 episodes of Eischied in its original Friday night time slot during the summer of 1983, almost four years after it had been cancelled.

== Cast ==
- Joe Don Baker as Chief Earl Eischied
- Alan Oppenheimer as Capt. Finnerty
- Suzanne Lederer as Carol Wright
- Alan Fudge as Dep. Kimbrough
- Eddie Egan as Ed Parks
- Vincent Bufano as Rick Alessi
- Laraine Stephens as Irene Stefan (recurring role)

== Episodes ==
No.	Title	Directed by	Written by	Original release date
1	"Only the Pretty Girls Die: Part 1"	Bob Kelljan	Mark Rodgers	September 21, 1979
2-hour episode: Chief of Detectives Earl Eischied is trying to catch serial killer Albert Colvin (James Stephens), who hunts down and shoots beautiful women while taunting reporters by phone. This story is a close retelling of the Son of Sam case.
2	"Only the Pretty Girls Die: Part 2"	Bob Kelljan	Mark Rodgers	September 28, 1979
Colvin claims his sixth victim, but without using the trademark silencer on his gun. Eischied sees this as a sign that the killer's self-control is slipping and may be a harbinger of his next planned attacks. Through clues given by Colvin to two reporters, Eischied is able to track Colvin to his final planned attack at a Catholic church.
3	"The U.N. Connection"	Harvey S. Laidman	Sean Baine	October 5, 1979
Eischied must find a way around diplomatic immunity when he suspects United Nations members of being drug smugglers.
4	"Angels of Terror"	Larry Elikann	Frank Abatemarco	October 19, 1979
Captain Finnerty is charged with negligent homicide for fatally shooting an assailant, a 13-year-old boy.
5	"The Accused"	Gene Nelson	Unknown	October 26, 1979
6	"Do They Really Mean to Die?"	Nicholas Sgarro	Irv Pearlberg	November 9, 1979
An overzealous police veteran (Scott Brady) jeopardizes Eischied's case against a procurer.
7	"The Dancer"	Harvey S. Laidman	Sean Baine	November 23, 1979
"The Dancer" (Christopher Connelly), a criminal from Eischied's past, is a serial killer who meets women in discos and tattoos them before raping and killing them.
8	"Who is the Missing Woman?"	Gene Kearney	Gene Kearney	November 30, 1979
A woman turns up at a New York City hospital badly beaten and raped. Eischied must deal with a victim that doesn't remember what happened to her, who did it or who she is.
9	"Spanish Eight"	Harvey S. Laidman	Mark Rodgers	December 7, 1979
Eischied investigates a gang that is flooding New York City's streets with Saturday-night-special handguns.
10	"Friday's Child"	Larry Elikann	Mark Rodgers	December 14, 1979
Detectives investigate a drug ring that is using children to move the shipments between locations.
11	"Fire for Hire"	Leo Penn	Frank Abatemarco	December 30, 1979
New York City is paralyzed by an arsonist who is creating havoc for Eischied's team of detectives.
12	"Powder Burn"	Jack Starrett	Dallas L. Barnes	January 20, 1980
Eischied suspects a man of murder, but he has an uphill battle to fight since the evidence doesn't add up.
13	"Buddy System"	Nicholas Sgarro	Art Eisenson	July 1, 1980
Chief Eischied implements a mandate that no cop goes out in uniform by himself when he receives a letter threatening to kill police officers unless a convicted criminal is released from jail.
