= Jay Presson Allen =

American screenwriter and playwright

- Allen c. 1970
- Born: Jacqueline Presson; March 3, 1922; San Angelo, Texas, U.S.
- Died: May 1, 2006 (aged 84); New York City, New York, U.S.
- Occupations: Screenwriter; playwright; novelist; actress
- Spouse(s): Robert M. Davis (1940s; divorced); Lewis M. Allen (1955–2003; his death)

Jacqueline “Jay” Presson Allen (March 3, 1922 – May 1, 2006) was an American screenwriter, playwright, and novelist. Known for her withering wit and sometimes off-color wisecracks, she was one of the few women making a living as a screenwriter at a time when women were a rarity in the profession. She was twice nominated for the Academy Award for Best Adapted Screenplay, for Bob Fosse’s Cabaret (1972) and Sidney Lumet’s Prince of the City (1981), among several other accolades.

== Early life ==
Allen was born Jacqueline Presson in San Angelo, Texas, on March 3, 1922, the only child of buyer Willie Mae (née Miller) and department store merchant Albert Jack Presson. She was never particularly fond of her given name, and decided to use her first initial when writing. She would spend all day at the movie house every weekend, from 1 p.m. until somebody dragged her out at 7 p.m. From that time on, movies became very important to her and she knew she would not be staying in her hometown. She attended Miss Hockaday's School for Young Ladies in Dallas for a couple of years, but later said she left the school "having had no education to speak of".

== Career ==
=== Early work ===
Allen skipped college and left home at the age of 18 to become an actress. She said her career in New York City lasted "for about 25 minutes" when she realized that she only liked rehearsals and the first week of performance, and would rather be "out there" where the decisions were being made. In the early 1940s, she married "the first grown man who asked me," Robert M. Davis, a promising young singer, and they lived in Claremont, California, during World War II. She continued acting while in California; she has a small credited role (under the name Jay Presson) in the 1945 film An Angel Comes to Brooklyn and can be glimpsed briefly as "Miss Zelda" in the 1946 film Gay Blades.

Allen became a writer by default, having always read constantly. Being able to write pretty well, she decided to "write her way out" of the marriage and set out to become financially independent of her husband. She always claimed her first husband's big fault was marrying someone too young. Her debut novel, Spring Riot, was published in 1948 and got mixed reviews. Her next effort was a play, which she sent to producer Bob Whitehead. Because he had produced Member of the Wedding, she thought he would like it since her play was also about a child, but the play came back from Whitehead's office rejected. Allen waited for a couple of months and sent it back, rightly figuring that some reader had rejected it instead of Whitehead himself. This time Whitehead read the play and instantly optioned it, but due to casting problems her play was never produced on stage. The reader who had initially rejected her play was Lewis M. Allen, whom she would later marry.

Allen returned to New York and performed on radio and in cabaret, both of which she loathed, and would go through the whole performance wishing to be fired. In the meantime she started writing again, little by little, and sold some of her work to live television programs like The Philco Television Playhouse. When she married Lewis M. Allen in 1955, they moved to the countryside, where Lewis wrote and Allen in her words "didn't want to do anything." She had a baby, and spent two and a half "absolutely wonderful years in the country."

Eventually the couple came back to the city to work. By then, Bob Whitehead had become a good friend and encouraged Allen to write another play. She drew on her married life and wrote The First Wife, about a suburban working couple. It was made into the film Wives and Lovers in 1963, starring Janet Leigh and Van Johnson. When Allen read The Prime of Miss Jean Brodie, by Muriel Spark, she instantly saw play potential where no one else did. After undergoing hypnotherapy to alleviate a yearlong bout of writer's block, Allen produced a draft of the play in three days.

=== Marnie ===
While The Prime of Miss Jean Brodie was still an unproduced script, Alfred Hitchcock read it and offered Allen the script for Marnie (1964). Hitchcock brought Allen to California to work on the film at Universal Studios in the San Fernando Valley. Allen, who lived close by, would bicycle to work. This upset Hitchcock, who insisted that a limousine be sent for her every day, whether she wanted it or not.

In Allen's opinion, she could not learn fast enough to make a first-rate movie, although she thought Marnie did have some good scenes in it. Hitchcock would have made her a director but she told him no. Said Allen: "It seems perfectly clear to me that any project takes a minimum of a year to direct. I like to get things on and over with. ... Did you ever hear the phrase, 'the lady proposes, the studio disposes'? I didn't make it up. I would never propose myself as a director." Under Hitchcock's mentoring, Allen developed the screenwriting talent she would use the rest of her career. Allen wrote that she never felt discriminated against. While being one of the rare female screenwriters in Hollywood in the 1960s, she said "almost all of the men I worked with were supportive. If I was getting a bum rap somewhere, I didn't know it."

=== The Prime of Miss Jean Brodie ===
The Prime of Miss Jean Brodie, about an iconoclast Scottish girls' school teacher, did not premiere on the London stage until after Marnie's completion. Produced by Donald Albery, it premiered at the Wyndham's Theatre in May 1966 with Vanessa Redgrave and ran hundreds of performances. In January 1968, it opened in New York with Zoe Caldwell as Brodie and ran for an entire year. Allen also wrote the screenplay for the 1969 film starring Maggie Smith and Robert Stephens.

Said Allen: "All the women who played Brodie got whatever prize was going around at that time. Vanessa did, Maggie [Smith] did".

=== Forty Carats ===
After Jean Brodie, Allen had another success on Broadway with Forty Carats (1968). Her adaptation of the French boulevard comedy by Pierre Barillet and Jean-Pierre Gredy premiered in December 1968 with Julie Harris as the 42-year-old who has an affair with a 22-year-old man. Harris won a Tony Award for her performance. In 1973, Allen adapted her play for the screen, which turned out to be a critical and commercial disappointment.

=== Travels with My Aunt ===
Robert Fryer, who had produced the Jean Brodie film, had collaborated with Katharine Hepburn to make the film version of Graham Greene's Travels with My Aunt (1972), specifically for George Cukor to direct. Cukor for some reason was not getting any work and Hepburn was casting around for projects. They asked Allen to come on board for the script, but she was busy and instead suggested Hugh Wheeler. After a few months, Fryer and Hepburn still weren't happy with Wheeler's script, so Allen agreed to work on the project and wrote a very straightforward script for them. But Hepburn had just starred in the disastrous adaptation of Madwoman of Chaillot and did not want, in Allen's words, "to play another crazy old lady." Hepburn was reluctant to let Cukor down and would not admit her reservations and began to find fault with the script, even rewriting many sections herself. Consequently, Allen finally gave up the endeavor, telling Hepburn that she ought to write it herself, which the actress did. Eventually, Hepburn provoked the studio into making her quit the project, leaving Fryer free to bring Jean Brodie's Maggie Smith onto the picture. One speech of Allen's remains in the script, otherwise it is all Hepburn's product. The Writer's Guild refused to put Hepburn's name on the script because she was not a guild member; Fryer refused to let Allen take her name off because she was the one he paid, and Wheeler was burned that he received no credit at all.

=== Cabaret ===
Structure was what Allen brought to the screenplay for Bob Fosse's Cabaret. The producers had not wanted to film the stage script by Joe Masteroff and John Van Druten, and felt that not portraying the male lead as a homosexual was dishonest to the story. They wanted to go back to Christopher Isherwood's original novel Goodbye to Berlin of 1939, but the Berlin stories weren't structured in any linear fashion and Allen had to diagram the entire story. Allen and Fosse got along badly from the start: she found him "so depressed that it took two hours just to get him in the frame of mind for work." In Allen's opinion most of the humor from the original was lost; she believed Fosse did not really like the lead character of Sally Bowles at all. She worked on the screenplay for ten months, but in the end Fosse and the producers were still unhappy with the final form, and having commitments elsewhere, Allen handed the script over to her friend Hugh Wheeler.

=== Funny Lady ===
In Allen's opinion, the problem with Funny Lady was that Barbra Streisand had not wanted to do a sequel to Funny Girl and was determined to give the director, Herbert Ross, a hard time. The picture does, however, contain some of Allen's most satisfying work, some of which she doesn't remember writing and just seems to have come out of nowhere.

=== Family ===
The idea for the television show Family was born in Aaron Spelling's kitchen, where he and Leonard Goldberg came up with the idea about a show that centered on the emotional life of a family. They pitched the idea to Allen and she liked it. Allen spent two weeks at the Beverly Hills Hotel while she knocked out a script. Len and Aaron loved it; it was touching and had marvelous moments of compassion, and was exactly what they had talked about in the kitchen. The pilot was great, but ABC did not buy it. It was not until two years later that ABC entered a production deal with Mike Nichols, who turned down all their ideas in favor of the script for Family that his Connecticut neighbor Jay Allen had shown him. It was Nichols who brought in Mark Rydell for the pilot, which premiered at 10:00 pm on March 9, 1976; the series went on to run for four years and 86 episodes. Later in life Allen would remark about television: "I hate it, I hate it because the buck doesn't stop anywhere."

=== Just Tell Me What You Want! ===
"Male characters are easier to write. They're simpler. I think women are generally more psychologically complicated. You have to put a little more effort into writing a woman." – Jay Presson Allen.

Allen wrote the novel Just Tell Me What You Want! in 1969, with the idea of turning it into a screenplay. After having trouble getting together a production, Allen sent it to Sidney Lumet, who surprisingly wanted to do it. In her opinion, Lumet was a wonderful structuralist but has his most difficult time with humorous dialogue; he had not found a way to shoot humorous dialogue as brilliantly as he shot everything else.

=== Prince of the City ===
When Allen read Robert Daley's book, Prince of the City (1978), she was convinced it was a Sidney Lumet project, but the film rights had already been sold to Orion Pictures for Brian De Palma and David Rabe. Allen let it be known that if that deal should fall through, then she wanted the picture for Sidney. Just as Lumet was about to sign for a different picture, they got the call that Prince of the City was theirs. Allen had not wanted to write Prince of the City, just produce it. She was put off by the book's non-linear story structure, but Lumet would not make the picture without her and agreed to write the outline for her. Lumet and Allen went over the book and agreed on what they could use and what they could do without. To her horror, Lumet would come in every day for weeks and scribble on legal pads. She was terrified that she would have to tell him that his stuff was unusable, but to her delight the outline was wonderful and she went to work. It was her first project with living subjects, and Allen interviewed nearly everyone in the book and had endless hours of Bob Leuci's tapes for back-up. With all her research and Lumet's outline, she eventually turned out a 365-page script in 10 days. It was nearly impossible to sell the studio on a three-hour picture, but by offering to slash the budget to $10 million they agreed.

When asked if the original author ever has anything to say about how their book is treated, Allen replied: "Not if I can help it. You cannot open that can of worms. You sell your book, you go to the bank, you shut up."

=== Deathtrap ===
Allen adapted Ira Levin's play Deathtrap (1982) for Lumet, exchanging a weak, confusing ending for a more directly resolved one. Though not being able to do what a screenwriter needs to do to a play – "opening it up," taking it outside the original set or sets, make it bigger – she was limited to bookending the script with scenes in a New York theater. The plotting was so very tight, which is what the studio executives had wanted when they bought it. It was up to Allen to cut away the underbrush, simplifying the rhetoric as much as possible and adding some realism to the characters.

=== La Cage Aux Folles ===
Allen returned to the stage with an adaptation for Angela Lansbury of A Little Family Business, a French boulevard comedy by Pierre Barillet and Jean-Pierre Gredy. She was also hired by Broadway producer Allan Carr to adapt Jean Poiret's non-musical 1973 play La Cage Aux Folles as a musical reset in New Orleans. The never-to-be-produced production was called The Queen of Basin Street, and was to be directed by Mike Nichols with Tommy Tune choreographing and Maury Yeston writing the songs. Nichols, who was a producing partner with Lewis Allen, eventually quit in a dispute over profits; Tommy Tune followed him and Carr fired Jay Allen. When Carr finally produced a musical version, Allen was forced to file suit for payment from her work on the adaptation.

=== The Verdict ===
"What I really like to do is a very swift rewrite for a great deal of money. Then I'm out of it. There's no emotional commitment at all – your name's not on it, you're home free", she would explain.

Twentieth-Century Fox brought Allen in for a rewrite when they were unhappy with the script that David Mamet had produced from Barry Reed's novel The Verdict, thinking he had deviated too much from the original material. She produced a script they were happy with, but then handed it to Robert Redford, who began to tinker it to fit his persona. Eventually the producers took it away from Redford and offered it to Lumet, who had just seen a production of Mamet's, American Buffalo with Al Pacino, and preferred to use Mamet's original script. In the end the studio had paid both Allen and Redford and ended up with Mamet's original script anyway.

=== Hothouse ===
Allen tried to recapture the success of Family with Hothouse for ABC in 1988; the drama about the lives and work experiences of the staff of a mental hospital lasted eight episodes. Personally Allen thought it was some of her best work, though its short life was a mixed blessing for her, said Allen: "Unfortunately, ABC didn't have the courage of their initial convictions. They skewered it, they turned tail on it. However if they had picked it up I'd have had to turn out 26 episodes. I'd be in Forest Lawn now. Television is a killer. It is really not for sissies."

=== Tru ===
The 1989 Broadway production of Tru starring Robert Morse as Truman Capote was actually a request of the lawyer for the Capote Estate. Allen was reluctant to write about Capote at first, but once she had researched him, she found the last ten years of his life not as off-putting as she had thought: "Capote had a kind of Gallantry in the face of a devastating situation." Friends of Capote were amazed at her accuracy portraying a man she had only met but not known, and there was much question about how many of the lines are Capote's and how many Allen's; she maintained that at least 70% of the dialogue is Capote's own.

=== The Big Love ===
In 1991, Allen directed, and co-wrote with her daughter Brooke Allen, the one-woman show The Big Love. It was based on Florence Aadland's scandalous 1961 book about her daughter Beverly Aadland's affair with movie star Errol Flynn when Beverly was 15 and Flynn was 48. Tracey Ullman played Florence Aadland. The show closed after 11 previews and 41 performances.

=== Script doctor ===
When she was not writing, Allen and her husband were among the most visible of Manhattan's theater crowd. She would spend her later years as a script doctor and observing particularly salacious crime trials from the benches in Manhattan Criminal Court. Allen had just about given up writing any more movies from beginning to end, preferring to do lucrative rewrites. It had stopped being fun for her. Script 'development' translated to 'scripts written by committee', but the upside was that "developed" scripts tend to need rewrites – from outside the "development circle".

"A production rewrite means that the project is in production. Big money elements – directors, actors – are pay or play. There is a shooting date. The shit is in the fan. And that's where writers like me come in. Writers who are fast and reliable. We are nicely paid to do these production rewrites... and we love these jobs. Without credit? Never with credit. If you go for credit on somebody else's work, you have to completely dismantle the structure. Who wants a job where you have to completely dismantle the structure? I only take things that I think are in reasonable shape. The director and the producer and the studio may not necessarily agree with me, but I think the script is in reasonable shape. Besides, no one but the writer ever knows how much trouble any one piece of work will be. Only the writer knows that. Only the writer. So I take what looks to me like something that is in good enough shape, yet which I can contribute to and make it worth the pay they are going to give me... There are more than one of us out there. These jobs are quick, sometimes they're even fun, and you don't have to take the terrible meetings. They're not breathing on you. They're just desperate to get a script. I've never taken anything that I knew I couldn't help. They pay good money."

In 1986, she had signed an agreement with Lorimar-Telepictures in order to help develop, write and produce projects, in collaboration with ABC Entertainment. Her last film work was her screenplay for the 1990 remake of the classic, Lord of the Flies. However, she disliked the finished product and had her name removed. The trick in adapting, Allen said in a 1972 interview with The New York Times, "is not to throw out the baby with the bath water. You can change all kinds of things, but don't muck around with the essence."

== Death ==
Allen suffered a stroke and died at her home in Manhattan on May 1, 2006, at the age of 84.

== Awards and honors ==
In 1982, Allen was awarded the Women in Film Crystal Award for outstanding women who, through their endurance and the excellence of their work, have helped to expand the role of women within the entertainment industry.

The papers of Jay Presson Allen and her husband Lewis M. Allen are held at the Harry Ransom Center in Austin, Texas.

== Credits ==
=== Novels ===
- Spring Riot (1948; as Jay Presson)
- Just Tell Me What You Want (1975)

=== Film ===
- Wives and Lovers (1963; play The First Wife)
- Marnie (1964; screenplay)
- The Prime of Miss Jean Brodie (1969; screenplay; play)
- Cabaret (1972; screenplay)
- Travels with My Aunt (1972; screenplay)
- Funny Lady (1975; screenplay)
- It's My Turn (1980; executive producer)
- Just Tell Me What You Want (1980; screenplay from her novel; producer)
- Prince of the City (1981; screenplay; executive producer)
- Deathtrap (1982; screenplay; executive producer)
- Lord of the Flies (1990; under the pseudonym Sara Schiff)

==== as an uncredited script doctor ====
- Never Cry Wolf (1983; uncredited rewrite)
- Copycat (1995; uncredited rewrite)

=== Stage plays ===
- The Prime of Miss Jean Brodie (1966), adaptation
- Forty Carats (1968), adaptation
- A Little Family Business (1982), adaptation
- Tru (1989) and directed
- The Big Love (1991) and directed
- La Cage aux Folles (1995), uncredited adaptation

=== Television ===
- Danger (1953; writer of 2 episodes, "Surface Tension" and "Inside Straight" as Jay Presson)
- Armstrong Circle Theatre (1954; writer of 1 episode "Brink of Disaster" as Jay Presson)
- The Philco-Goodyear Television Playhouse (1954; teleplay writer of 1 episode "Beg, Borrow or Steal" as Jay Presson)
- Star Tonight (1955; writer of 1 episode "The Dark Search" as Jay Presson)
- Goodyear Playhouse (writer of 1 episode "Do It Yourself" as Jay Presson)
- The Borrowers (1973; teleplay)
- Family pilot: "The Best Years" (1976; teleplay)
- The Prime of Miss Jean Brodie (1978; teleplays)
- Hothouse (1988; executive producer, creator)
- American Playhouse: Tru (1992; teleplay)

== Bibliography ==
- Acker, Ally (1991). Reel women: pioneers of the cinema 1896 to the present. London: Batsford. ISBN 0-7134-6960-9.
- Bergan, Ronald (May 5, 2006). "Jay Presson Allen Writer of screen adaptations true to the original's essence". The Guardian.
- Crist, Judith (1984), Take 22: Moviemakers on Moviemaking (New York: Viking)
- Gardner, Ralph (January 1991). "Jay Presson Allen: Who would rather write". Cosmopolitan.
- Gottfried, Martin (2003). All his jazz: the life & death of Bob Fosse. New York: Da Capo Press. ISBN 0-306-81284-3.
- Graham, Jefferson; Spelling, Aaron (1996). Aaron Spelling: A Prime-Time Life. New York: St. Martin's Press. ISBN 0-312-31344-6.
- McGilligan, Patrick (1986). Backstory: interviews with screen writers of Hollywood's golden age. Berkeley: University of California Press. ISBN 0-520-05689-2.
- Moral, Tony Lee (2005). Hitchcock and the Making of Marnie. Maryland: Scarecrow Press. ISBN 978-0-8108-5684-4.
- Robertson, Campbell (May 2, 2006). "Jay Presson Allen, 84, Writer of Adaptations for the Stage, Dies". New York Times.
- Rosenfield, Paul (October 5, 1982). "The Prime Prose of Jay Allen". L.A.Times. Archived from the original on August 1, 2003.
- Sealy, Shirley; Crist, Judith (1984). Take 22: moviemakers on moviemaking. New York, NY: Viking. ISBN 0-670-49185-3.
- Soares, Andre (May 2, 2006). "Jay Presson Allen". Alternate Film Guide.
- Suskin, Steven (2000). Show tunes: the songs, shows, and careers of Broadway's major composers. Oxford: Oxford University Press. ISBN 0-19-512599-1.
- "Jay Allen suit vs. Allan Carr asks 'Cage' royalties, profits". Variety. 313. November 2, 1983.
