= Richard Foronjy =

American actor (1937–2024)

- Foronjy in Midnight Run, 1988
- Born: Richard Edward Foronjy; August 3, 1937; Brooklyn, New York, U.S.
- Died: May 19, 2024 (aged 86)
- Occupation: Actor
- Years active: 1973–2003

Richard Edward Foronjy (August 3, 1937 – May 19, 2024) was an American film and television actor. He was best known for playing the mobster Tony Darvo in the 1988 film Midnight Run.

== Life and career ==
Foronjy was born in Brooklyn, New York. He was of Armenian descent. Before becoming an actor, he had an extensive criminal record, including armed robbery. He also worked as a butcher. He began his screen career in 1973, playing the small role of Corsaro in the film Serpico. In 1974, he appeared in the film The Gambler. He moved to Hollywood, California in 1975.

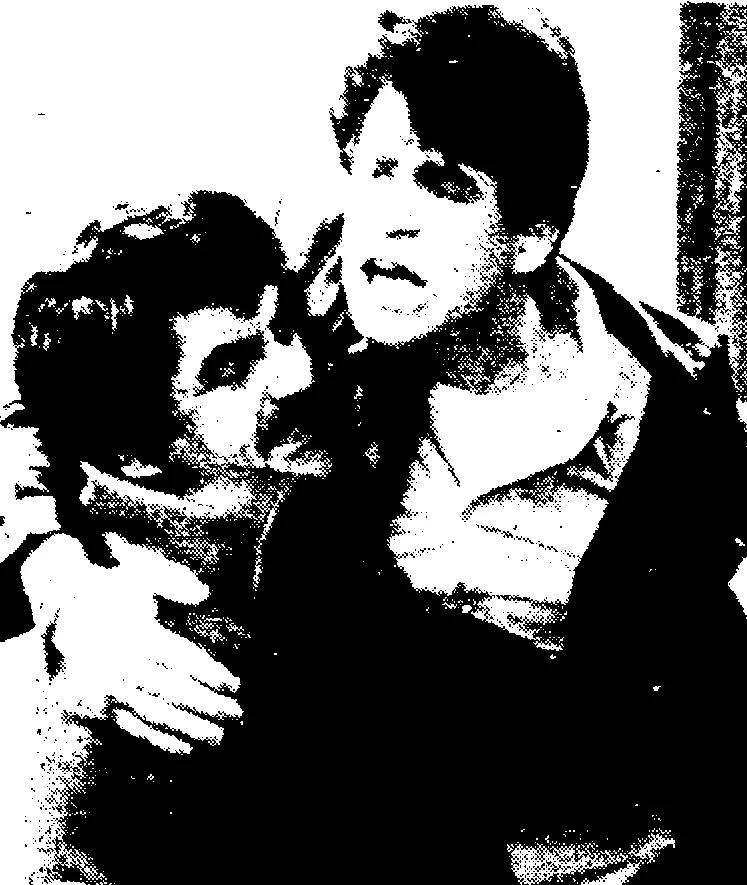
Foronjy (left) with Treat Williams, 1981

Later in his career, Foronjy guest-starred in numerous television programs including The Bob Newhart Show, M*A*S*H, Hill Street Blues, Who's the Boss?, The Jeffersons, Taxi, The Streets of San Francisco, Baretta and Silver Spoons. In the 1984 film Repo Man, he played Arnold Plettschner, the rent-a-cop who memorably said, "You’re fuckin’ right I'm Plettschner! Arnold Plettschner! Three times decorated in two world wars! I was killing people while you were still swimming around in your father's balls! You little scumbag! I worked five years in a slaughterhouse, and ten years as a prison guard in Attica!" In 1988, he played the mobster Tony Darvo in the film Midnight Run, who notably chased Robert De Niro and Charles Grodin's characters. He also appeared in films such as Carlito's Way (as Peter Amadesso), Prince of the City (as Detective Joe Marinaro), Ghostbusters II, The Jerk, Man of the House and City Heat.

In 2020, Foronjy wrote and published a memoir, From the Mob to the Movies.

== Death ==
Foronjy died on May 19, 2024, at the age of 86.

At the 97th Academy Awards, his name was mentioned in the In Memoriam section.
