= Larry Davis (born 1966) =

American criminal from the Bronx, New York, United States (1966-2008)

- Davis mugshot taken by the New York City Police Department on January 20, 1986.
- Born: Larry Davis; May 28, 1966; New York City, New York, U.S.
- Died: February 20, 2008 (aged 41); St. Luke's Hospital, Newburgh, New York, U.S.
- Cause of death: Murder by stabbing
- Other names: Adam Abdul-Hakeem (since 1989)
- Known for: Shootout in the Bronx with New York City police in November 1986.
- Convictions: November 1988 – illegal gun possession; April 26, 1991 – murder
- Criminal charges: Murder; aggravated assault and attempted murder
- Penalty: November 1988 – 5 to 15 years; April 26, 1991 – 25 years
- Capture status: Arrested
- Wanted by: New York City Police Department
- Wanted since: November 19, 1986
- Time at large: 18 days

Details
- Country: United States
- State: New York
- Locations: The Bronx: Highbridge; Morrisania; Manhattan: Harlem; Washington Heights
- Imprisoned at: Shawangunk Correctional Facility

Larry Davis (May 28, 1966 – February 20, 2008), later known as Adam Abdul-Hakeem, was an American criminal who gained notoriety in November 1986 for his shootout with officers of the New York City Police Department (NYPD), in which six officers were shot. Davis, asserting self-defense, was acquitted of all charges aside from illegal gun possession. Davis was later convicted for the 1986 murder of a Bronx drug dealer and sentenced to twenty-five years to life in prison. Davis died after being stabbed by a fellow inmate in 2008.

On November 19, 1986, nine NYPD officers, with nearly twenty outside the building, raided the South Bronx apartment of Davis' sister. Davis escaped the ensuing shootout after a shotgun round creased his scalp, and all six officers who had been shot survived. Police explained the raid as an attempt to question Davis as a multiple-murder suspect, finally obtained an arrest warrant for that and re-explained the raid as an attempt to arrest him. On the seventeenth day of a massive manhunt, Davis was traced to a Bronx apartment block, where he hid in an unknown family's unit. Telephoned by police, he claimed to hold its occupants hostage. After tireless negotiations that lasted the entire night, Davis was eventually convinced that police officers would not shoot him because of all the massive media presence, deciding to surrender peacefully.

Davis' legal defense, led by William Kunstler, contended that the raid was a pretense to murder Davis for knowledge of officers' alleged complicity in illicit drug sales and to punish him for abandoning his own drug dealing under their sanction. In March 1988, on jury trial for the killing of four drug dealers—allegedly the pretext for the 1986 raid—Davis was acquitted. Then, in November, as to the nine raiding and six shot officers, Davis' acquittal of aggravated assault and attempted murder triggered widespread outrage. About 1,000 NYPD officers publicly demonstrated against the verdict. Yet for many others, Davis became a folk hero. Still others thought of him as an unsavory character, but probably truthful about the police and the shootout.

Serving five to fifteen years on the November 1988 convictions for illegal gun possession, Davis was acquitted of another alleged drug dealer's murder. But in a third murder trial, for the murder of a different alleged drug dealer, Davis was convicted and sentenced to twenty-five years to life in prison. While incarcerated, Davis (who changed his name after converting to Islam) continued to allege that police had framed him. A prevalent view attributes his infamous acquittal, rather, to racial bias by a proverbial "Bronx jury". But particularly with the Mollen Commission's later exposure of widespread criminality, including drug dealing and violence, by NYPD officers, and then a 2003 documentary favoring Davis' account, his story continues to provoke divided reactions.

== Biography ==
=== Early and personal life ===
Larry Davis was born in New York City on May 28, 1966. An aspiring rapper, he was known by peers as musically talented, playing multiple instruments. He was also entrepreneurial, reputedly operating small music studios in the Bronx and Manhattan, while also repairing and modifying motorcycles. Davis' peers acknowledge that he had begun dealing drugs midway through adolescence, but claim that he ceased once he learned the woman expecting his first child miscarried, which he blamed on her use of crack cocaine. Davis had one child, a daughter named Larrima, born in 1986.

=== Problems with NYPD ===
Davis' arrest record, beginning in early 1983, included a 1984 robbery conviction and subsequent probation violation. By the time of the November 1986 shootout, a court hearing for that violation had been postponed four times. Soon after the successful manhunt, the Bronx District Attorney's office alleged that, as The New York Times then paraphrased, "Davis was part of a small, loosely organized, 'very violent' group of gunmen who have robbed, assaulted and slain drug dealers in the Bronx and northern Manhattan in recent months."

Approaching trial, the district attorney's office had one witness outside of law enforcement: Roy L. Gray, who admitted under oath to steering "traffic to coke spots." Allegedly, on October 26, 1986, Gray was robbed of two dollars in Manhattan's Washington Heights neighborhood. Four days later, on October 30, Gray spotted the robber, later understood as Davis, about to rob some cocaine dealers in Harlem. Reportedly, Gray thus alerted the New York City Police Department (NYPD) and rode in the police car that chased a getaway car, carrying Davis and two other men. The pursuit ended in Highbridge, where, along Jerome Avenue, upon issuing three gunshots at police, Davis and his accomplices evaded arrest by vanishing into an apartment building.

In early November, acting on a tip, police sought Davis but failed to find him at his sister's apartment at 1231 Fulton Avenue in the Bronx's Morrisania neighborhood. They returned to the apartment on November 19, when the infamous shootout occurred. Afterward, the NYPD explained the raid as an effort to question Davis, then later changed their rationale as an attempt to arrest him, albeit without an arrest warrant. Months later, it was reported that "officials from the Bronx District Attorney's office and the Police Department deflected questions about why no warrant had been issued for Mr. Davis's arrest after the Jerome Avenue incident. Each agency referred questions to the other." At some point, a senior NYPD official argued that "once you move to introduce an accusatory instrument, you lose the benefit of being able to talk to that person."

In any case, the NYPD reported that Gray, as a robbery victim of Davis, examined photos and provided the "positive identification" of Davis; that Davis' fingerprints were in the getaway car; that two shell casings, recovered from the scene, matched the pistol on Davis at his December 6 arrest; and that ballistics tests tied this gun to the killings of four suspected drug dealers in Manhattan just hours before the October 30 car chase to Jerome Avenue.

Davis maintained that the NYPD had framed him for these murders. Similarly, his attorneys William Kunstler and Lynne Stewart, as well as Davis' peers and family, all contended that, five years before the November 1986 shootout, certain NYPD officers had recruited Davis, then aged 15, to deal drugs under their sanction, and then turned a blind eye to the dealing of Davis' associates who began working under him. However, these officers began harassing these dealers and communicating death threats once Davis stopped dealing drugs in late 1986 while withholding drug proceeds, reputedly some $40,000.

=== 1986 shootout and escape ===
On the evening of Wednesday, November 19, 1986, acting on a tip, an NYPD team of twenty-seven officers from the 41st Precinct and the Emergency Service Unit (ESU) converged on the six-story apartment building at 1231 Fulton Avenue, where two of Davis' sisters lived in adjoining apartments on the ground floor. At about 8:30 p.m., fifteen officers surrounded the building and twelve others entered; nine of these went to the three-room apartment of Davis' sister Regina Lewis and seven entered. Inside were Davis, his girlfriend, his sister, her husband and four children. Lewis' two infant children were asleep in the rear bedroom.

Interviewed the next day, Lewis reported that once she answered a door knock, police entered the living room with weapons drawn, ordered the adults to get the children out of the apartment and called, "Come out, Larry, you don't have a chance—we've got you surrounded!" At trial, police alleged that Davis had fired first. The jury believed the events presented by the defense, in which an officer entered the apartment with a shotgun and fired at Davis while he was seated behind a desk holding his baby. The officer, thinking he had hit Davis, was then shot in the neck by Davis with a handgun. Police then took cover, returning fire as they retreated. In the confusion, no one kept track of Davis, who slipped into his other sister's apartment and escaped out a back window. Lewis had complained to her brother about bringing guns to the apartment and told him to get out; he left but returned. She quoted him as telling her, "If I'm caught in the street, the police are going to shoot me. But I am going to shoot them first."

Police collected the shotgun and the expended shells from the .45 caliber pistol that Davis took with him. A .32 caliber revolver and .357 Magnum pistol were also left behind. Ballistics tests would allegedly later link the .32 caliber revolver to the killing of a Manhattan drug dealer and the .45 caliber pistol to the four dead drug dealers in the Bronx. A police official said that all escape routes had been covered by officers but none apparently saw Davis leave. He also said that the wounded officers were unable to return fire effectively due to the presence in the apartment of the two infants and other bystanders. Davis fired four shotgun rounds and nine .45 caliber pistol shots; police fired four shotgun rounds and twenty pistol shots. Neither Davis nor the two infants with him in the bedroom were wounded.

In the following year, three of the wounded officers accused the NYPD of "negligent" and "reckless" planning and execution of the raid, and blamed Bronx detectives for creating "chaos" by bursting into the apartment before ESU officers could seal off escape routes.

=== Search and capture ===
The six wounded officers were carried across the street to the Bronx-Lebanon Hospital, and the manhunt began. The rest of the building and the surrounding area were searched immediately. Police stakeouts were set up at terminals, bridges and tunnels leading out of New York City, and a nationwide alert was issued. As the manhunt spread, raids were staged in Chicago, Albany, Newark and other cities where Davis had relatives or friends. A man who claimed to be Davis contacted ABC News, expressing fears he would be beaten by police and stating he would not be taken alive.

Acting on a tip that Davis had been seen entering his mother's home four days after the escape, police searched the building while interviewing Davis' mother in a laundromat across the street. She suffered an apparent heart attack shortly thereafter. As she recuperated three days later, she urged her son to call the National Association for the Advancement of Colored People (NAACP), who had offered to help arrange a safe surrender.

On the afternoon of December 5, police received another tip that Davis had been seen entering the Bronx housing project where his sister Margaret lived. They surrounded the fourteen-story building, closed off local streets and posted sharpshooters on nearby rooftops. After searching his sister's second-floor apartment, police began a systematic canvass of all 312 units. At some point during the day, Davis forced his way at gunpoint into Apartment 14-EB, where Elroy and Sophia Sewer lived with their two daughters, just as neighbor Theresa Ali and her two-year-old son arrived for a visit. Elroy arrived home at 8:00 p.m. to find his family and neighbors being held hostage by Davis. At 11:45 p.m. Davis released the two visitors and sent Elroy out to pick up food from a nearby Chinese restaurant. He also ordered Elroy to call Davis' mother and sister, whose phones has been wiretapped, and give false location information. When Elroy returned with the food, he was stopped for questioning by police and, at 12:45 a.m., informed them that his wife and two daughters were being held hostage by Davis.

Police set up a command post in a nearby apartment, and by 1:30 a.m. had established telephone contact. At one point, Davis threatened to kill the hostages with a hand grenade, but at other points he chatted with crisis negotiators about stereo equipment, asked for a lawyer and showed concern for his own safety, saying that he was afraid police would harm him. Throughout, negotiators repeated, "There is no use running, you have nowhere to hide now." To assure Davis that he would not be harmed, police showed him the press credentials of three reporters in a nearby apartment and allowed him to speak to his girlfriend. At about 7:00 a.m. Davis laid down his .45 caliber pistol and surrendered. As he was taken from the building in handcuffs, residents leaned out of their windows, clapped and chanted Davis' name.

=== Murder and attempted murder trials ===
The Bronx County District Attorney, along with district attorneys in Manhattan and Long Island, brought many charges against Davis, including illegal gun possession, murder, attempted murder of police, kidnapping and car theft. However, despite three trials in two years, prosecutors were unable to convince a jury that Davis was guilty for any but the weapons charge—the ones he used in November 1986 shootout—until a jury convicted him and his brother, Eddie, in the August 1986 killing of a drug dealer.

==== March 1988 acquittal for the killing of four Bronx drug dealers ====
The four murders occurred in October 1986. The prosecution, contending that Davis was a crack dealer who specialized in the armed robbery of rival dealers, called over fifty witnesses, encompassing ballistic evidence and fingerprints on a cash box placing Davis at the crime scene. Davis's attorneys, Kunstler and Stewart, in their opening and closing arguments, contended that the prosecution's evidence was fabricated. They contended Davis had been recruited into a drug ring by rogue police officers, who had framed him for the murders and planned to kill him in the raid. The jury found conflicting testimony from witnesses, and discrepancies in times stated by prosecution witnesses. After deliberating for nine days—then the longest in Bronx history for a single defendant—the jury acquitted Davis.

==== November 1988 acquittal for shooting of nine police officers ====
Davis faced numerous charges from the infamous shootout, where he shot six police officers: nine counts of attempted murder, six counts of aggravated assault, eight counts of criminal weapons possession and two counts of criminal firearm use. Convicted only on criminal weapons possession, Davis was sentenced to five to fifteen years in prison. During jury selection, the defense accused the prosecution of refusing black women, who would likely empathize with Davis. The judge ruled that the defense, likewise abusing peremptory challenges, had excluded white jurors on racial reasoning. Dismissing the first six seated jurors, then, Judge Fried declared a mistrial.

A second mistrial was declared, at the request of both sides, once the new jury's only white member expressed concern that acquitting Davis would subject him to harassment by police. Finally seated was a jury of ten blacks and two Hispanics. During trial, ballistic experts incriminated the .45-caliber pistol allegedly seized at Davis' capture. Several wounded officers, including "point man" Thomas McCarren, who had entered first, identified Davis as the shooter. McCarren testified that once he entered the apartment, Davis rose from a sofa and, carrying a handgun, ran down a narrow hall to a back bedroom, prompting pursuit by McCarren, who next sustained gunfire to his mouth upon seeing Davis fire the pistol at him. But a 12-gauge shotgun slug was embedded in the bedroom's dresser drawer.

The defense implicated that McCarren, carrying a shotgun, had fired first, missing Davis but putting the slug in the dresser drawer. McCarren countered that he had earlier given his shotgun to a detective assigned to cover the building's rear, and himself had only a .38 caliber revolver while entering the apartment. In any case, the defense contended that Davis, knowing that police officers sought to kill him, shot in self-defense. They charged that police officers were corrupt and involved in the drug trade. Davis's mother testified that two weeks before the raid, a police officer had pushed her and threatened to kill him. She testified, further, that she had warned her son, and had complained to the police department's Civilian Complaint Review Board, which sustained her complaint.

On November 20, 1988, after deliberating 38 hours over five days, the jury acquitted Davis of all charges, except six counts of criminal possession of a weapon. Interviewed afterward, the jury forewoman said Davis was a "young and innocent kid who got recruited by a few corrupt policemen." McCarren, who had been the most seriously wounded in the raid and had been forced into retirement, called it "a racist verdict" and added, "The day this happened, a bunch of good honest police officers went to lock up Larry Davis because he had killed people, and not for anything else." Kunstler said, "The jury understood what happened—that he acted in self-defense." Stewart quipped, "I really think that the black community is no longer going to have black Sambos—they're going to have black Rambos."

==== December 1989 acquittal for the murder of a Harlem drug dealer ====
Victor Lagombra, reputedly a "mid-level" crack dealer in Harlem, was murdered in September 1986. Davis went on trial for the murder in October 1989. The prosecution accused Davis of robbing two drug dealers when surprised by Lagombra walking into the apartment, prompting Davis' "cold-blooded act of savagery." Ballistics tests tied Davis's .32 caliber revolver to the killing. Two defense witnesses testified that, on the day of the murder, Davis was in Florida making a rap album.

After the five-week trial, the jury returned from its three-day deliberation in December 1989, with the verdict: not guilty. Although not Davis' attorney in this case, Kunstler repeated that Davis had helped rogue police officers sell drugs and asserted that the repeated accusations against Davis reflected a conspiracy.

==== March 1991 conviction for the murder of a Bronx drug dealer ====
Raymond Vizcaino, reputedly a drug dealer in the Bronx, was murdered in August 1986. In January 1987, Davis' older brother Eddie was arrested and charged. Allegedly, Eddie and Larry, along with two others, attempted a robbery at a Webster Avenue apartment and shot through the door, killing Vizcaino. A jury convicted Eddie in June 1989.

Larry Davis' trial began five months later. In March 1991, the jury found him guilty. Already serving five to fifteen years on weapons convictions, Davis received another twenty-five years to life in prison. Once sentenced, creating a loud scene until the judge expelled him, Davis spoke for about an hour, airing again his longstanding complaint that police and the judicial system were conducting a vendetta against him.

=== Death ===
Davis served his sentence at Shawangunk Correctional Facility near the Ulster County hamlet of Wallkill, New York. At approximately 7 p.m. on February 20, 2008, a correctional officer overseeing the block yard noticed inmates congregating around an argument between two prisoners. When the officer went to break it up, he found Davis using his walking cane to fend off an inmate from attacking him with a 9-inch (23 cm) long metal shiv. Davis was unsuccessful and was stabbed numerous times.

The officer called for assistance. The attacker was restrained and taken to the Special Housing Unit to remain in segregated custody. Davis was taken to the facility infirmary where first aid was rendered. Davis, having lost much blood, lost consciousness and eventually showed no vital signs. Not being a trauma level infirmary, the supervising nurse called for an emergency transport by ambulance to St. Luke's Hospital in nearby Newburgh, where he was pronounced dead on arrival.

After questioning by the New York State Police and the New York State Department of Correctional Services's (DOCS) inspector general's office, another inmate, Luis Rosado, an alleged self-made Crip from the Lower East Side of Manhattan, was charged with the murder. Rosado was already serving a sentence of twenty-five years to life for murder and assault charges in the early 1980s and had been denied parole in 2007. He was arraigned at Shawangunk Town Court the next morning. DOCS officials said both he and Davis had long disciplinary records, including fights with other inmates, but there was no record of any previous violence between the two.

In July 2008, an Ulster County grand jury indicted Rosado on nine felony charges related to the stabbing, including three different counts of murder, assault, criminal possession of a weapon and possession of prison contraband. The murder charges carried a potential sentence of life without parole. After his arrest, Rosado was moved to Clinton Correctional Facility in upstate New York. In February 2009, Luis Rosado pleaded guilty to first-degree manslaughter in Ulster County Court and was sentenced to an additional 10 years in prison, to be served consecutively with his current 25-to-life sentence for murder. Rosado was later paroled in 2021. Following his parole, Rosado stated in an interview that Davis was not his intended target, claiming that Davis had intervened in Rosado's attempt to kill a convicted child molester.
