= Robert P. Patterson Jr. =

American judge

Robert Porter Patterson Jr.

Senior Judge of the United States District Court for the Southern District of New York
- In office December 31, 1998 – April 21, 2015

Judge of the United States District Court for the Southern District of New York
- In office October 6, 1988 – December 31, 1998
- Appointed by: Ronald Reagan
- Preceded by: Whitman Knapp
- Succeeded by: George B. Daniels

Personal details
- Born: Robert Porter Patterson Jr. July 11, 1923 New York City, New York, U.S.
- Died: April 21, 2015 (aged 91) New York City, New York, U.S.
- Parent: Robert P. Patterson (father)
- Education: Harvard University (BA); Columbia University (LLB)

Robert Porter Patterson Jr. (July 11, 1923 – April 21, 2015) was a United States district judge of the United States District Court for the Southern District of New York.

== Early life and career ==
Born in New York City, New York on July 11, 1923, the son of United States Secretary of War Robert P. Patterson, Patterson Jr. was in the United States Army Air Corps from 1942 to 1956, during which time he received a Bachelor of Arts degree from Harvard College in 1947 and a Bachelor of Laws from Columbia Law School in 1950. He was in private practice in New York City from 1950 to 1952, then served as assistant counsel to the New York State Crime Commission from 1952 to 1953, and as an Assistant United States Attorney for Southern District of New York from 1953 to 1956. He was also an assistant counsel to the United States Senate Banking and Currency Committee in 1954. He was in private practice in New York City again from 1956 (joining the firm founded by his father, Patterson, Belknap & Webb - later Patterson, Belknap, Webb & Tyler) to 1988, working as a special hearing officer for conscientious objectors in the United States Department of Justice from 1961 to 1968, and as minority counsel to a Select Committee Pursuant to United States House of Representatives Resolution Number 1 in 1967.

== Federal judicial service ==
In March 1988, New York Democratic Senator Daniel Patrick Moynihan recommended Patterson, a Republican, for a seat on the United States District Court as part of a bipartisan deal between him and New York's other senator, Republican Alfonse D'Amato, that permitted New York's senator from the party that was not in the White House to select a small number of federal judges from New York. Similar deals have been worked out over the years between New York's senators to pave the way for nominations of Sonia Sotomayor and John E. Sprizzo, both of whom also were recommended by minority-party senators from New York and ultimately were nominated by the president and confirmed to the federal bench.

On June 14, 1988, President Ronald Reagan nominated Patterson to a seat on the United States District Court for the Southern District of New York vacated by Judge Whitman Knapp. On August 10, 1988, the United States Senate Committee on the Judiciary reported on Patterson's nomination on a voice vote without dissent. The next day, however, Republican Senator Gordon Humphrey placed a hold on Patterson's nomination and subsequently queried the nominee about his positions on abortion. Ultimately, Patterson was confirmed by the United States Senate on October 5, 1988, and received his commission the following day. He assumed senior status on December 31, 1998, and died on April 21, 2015, at the age of 91.

== Sources ==
Legal offices
| Preceded by Whitman Knapp | Judge of the United States District Court for the Southern District of New York; 1988–1998 | Succeeded by George B. Daniels |
