= Whitman Knapp =

American judge (1909–2004)

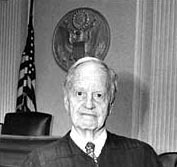

Senior Judge of the United States District Court for the Southern District of New York
- In office November 23, 1987 – June 14, 2004

Judge of the United States District Court for the Southern District of New York
- In office June 30, 1972 – November 23, 1987
- Appointed by: Richard Nixon
- Preceded by: Walter R. Mansfield
- Succeeded by: Robert P. Patterson Jr.

Personal details
- Born: Percy Whitman Knapp; February 24, 1909 New York City, New York
- Died: June 14, 2004 (aged 95) New York City, New York
- Education: Yale University (B.A.); Harvard Law School (LL.B.)

Percy Whitman Knapp (February 24, 1909 – June 14, 2004) was a United States district judge for the United States District Court for the Southern District of New York from 1972 to 2004. He, beforehand, led an investigation into corruption in the New York City Police Department from 1970 to 1972.

== Early life and education ==
Born on February 24, 1909, in New York City, New York, Knapp was the son of Wallace Percy Knapp, a wealthy lawyer in New York. His mother was killed in a horse riding accident in Central Park when he was only three years old. He attended The Browning School, graduating in 1927, The Choate School (now Choate Rosemary Hall), graduating in 1927, and Yale University, graduating in 1931 with a Bachelor of Arts degree. He went on to Harvard Law School, where he was editor of the Harvard Law Review, graduating in 1934 with a Bachelor of Laws. He married Elizabeth Mercer shortly after graduation.

== Legal career ==
After his graduation from law school, he started working with the law firm of Cadwalader, Wickersham & Taft in Manhattan. He remained there until 1937, when he left to become an Assistant District Attorney in Manhattan under the newly elected racket-busting District Attorney Thomas E. Dewey. In 1941, Knapp returned to private life and joined the law firm of Donovan, Leisure, Newton & Lumbard. Within a year Frank S. Hogan, Manhattan's new District Attorney, persuaded him to return to public service and he served as an assistant district attorney of the Indictments and Frauds Division, from 1942 to 1944, and as an assistant district attorney of the Appellate Division, from 1944 to 1950. In 1950, Knapp left Mr. Hogan's office to again enter private practice until his appointment to the federal bench in 1972. Concurrent with his private practice, he served as a special counsel to Dewey, who had become governor of New York State, and was a member of the commission that revised the state's criminal code. Knapp served during 1953 to 1954 as special counsel to the Waterfront Commission of New York Harbor, which looked into corruption on the waterfront.

== Knapp Commission ==
In 1970, Mayor John V. Lindsay appointed Knapp to head a five-member commission investigating corruption in the New York City Police Department later known as the Knapp Commission. The probe was sparked by revelations from two police officers, Patrolman Frank Serpico, and Sergeant David Durk. Looking back on the work of the Knapp Commission, Knapp said that the relatively few convictions did not matter as much as his work did, for he felt his work had changed the culture of the police so that they took the charge of corruption in their midst more seriously.

== Federal judicial service ==
Knapp was nominated by President Richard Nixon on June 15, 1972, to a seat on the United States District Court for the Southern District of New York vacated by Judge Walter R. Mansfield. He was confirmed by the United States Senate on June 28, 1972, and received his commission on June 30, 1972. He assumed senior status on November 23, 1987. His service was terminated on June 14, 2004, due to his death in New York City.

=== Notable cases ===
In 1986, Knapp presided over the racketeering case against Bronx County Democratic leader Stanley M. Friedman. In 1993, Knapp joined with Judge Jack B. Weinstein of the United States District Court for the Eastern District of New York, based in Brooklyn, New York, in declaring that they would no longer preside over drug trials.

== Death ==
On June 14, 2004, Knapp died at the age of 95 at the Cabrini Hospice in Manhattan. He served on the bench up until his death. He was survived by his third wife, Ann Fallert Knapp, a son, Gregory Wallace Knapp, and by three children from his first wife, Elizabeth Mercer Nason; a son, Whitman E. Knapp, and two daughters, Caroline Hines and Marion Knapp; five grandchildren and five great-grandchildren.

== See also ==
- List of Georgetown University business alumni
- Thomas E. Dewey
- Frank S. Hogan
- John V. Lindsay
- Mollen Commission
- Police corruption
- Police misconduct
- Serpico

Legal offices
| Preceded by Walter R. Mansfield | Judge of the United States District Court for the Southern District of New York; 1972–1987 | Succeeded by Robert P. Patterson Jr. |
