= Thomassin =

- Neighborhood
- Location in Haiti
- Coordinates: 18°29′18″N 72°18′43.4″W
- Country: Haiti
- Department: Ouest
- Arrondissement: Port-au-Prince
- Elevation: 944 m (3,097 ft)

Thomassin (French pronunciation: [tɔmasɛ̃]) is a neighborhood on the mountainside south of Pétion-Ville, Haiti. Many upper-class citizens reside in the area.

== Geography ==
=== Climate ===
Climate is tropical with some variation depending on altitude. The average high temperature in Thomassin is 20.3 °C (68.54 °F). August being the warmest month with an average of 21.9 °C (71.42 °F). January has the lowest temperature of any month throughout the year, with an average low of 71.3 °C (64.94 °F).

The annual average rainfall 1755 mm (69.09 in). With an average precipitation of 27 mm (1.06 in) in January, it is the driest month of the year. May sees the most precipitation with an annual average of 255 mm (10.04 in).

== See also ==
- Kenscoff
