= Assault of Abner Louima =

Haitian-American police brutality victim (born 1966)

Abner Louima
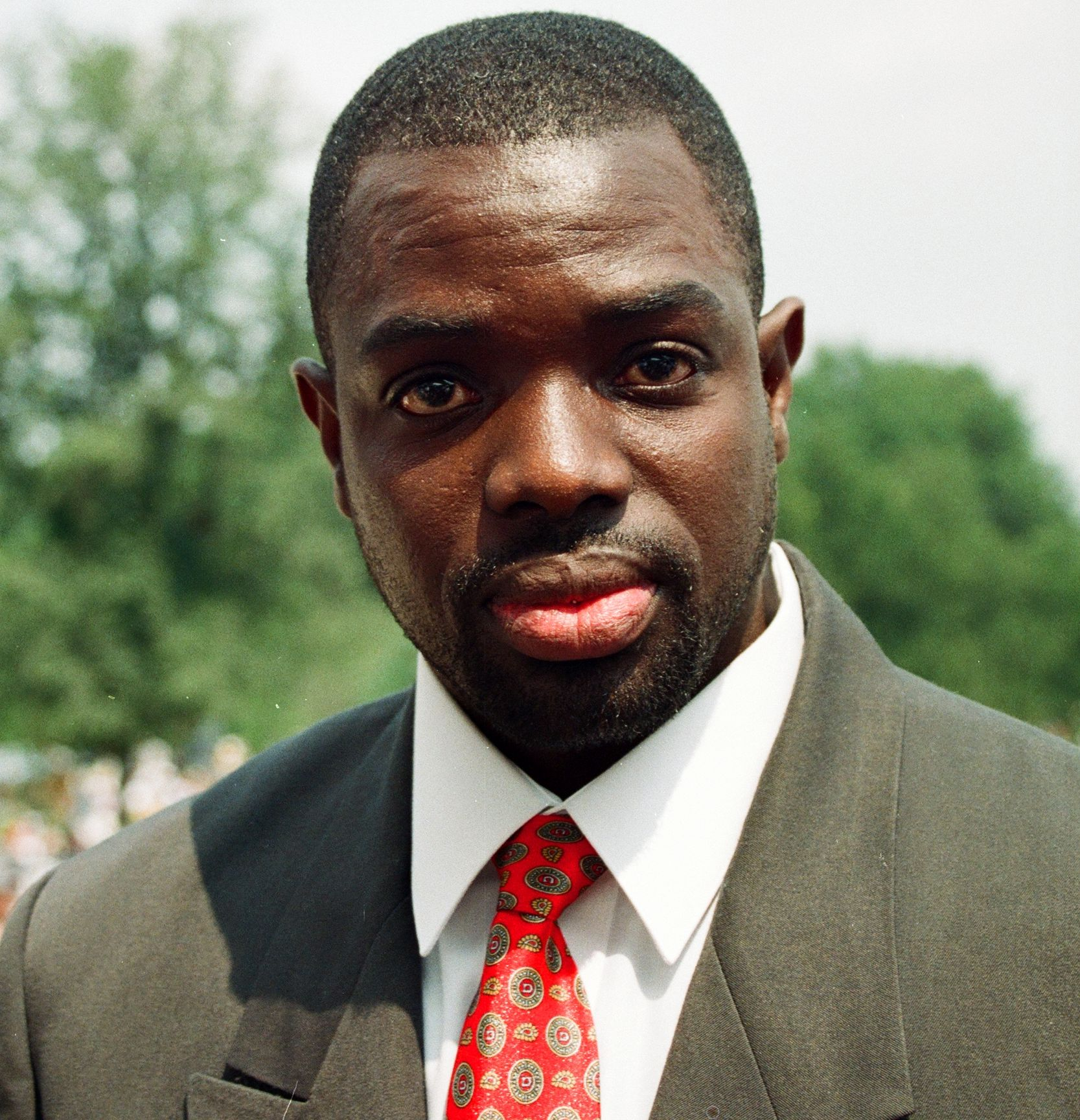
- Louima in 2000
- Born: November 24, 1966 (age 59); Thomassin, Haiti
- Education: École nationale supérieure d'Arts et Métiers
- Occupations: Electrical engineer; security guard; activist
- Organization: Abner Louima Foundation
- Known for: 1997 police brutality victim

Abner Louima (born November 24, 1966) is a Haitian American man who, on the night of August 9, 1997, was physically attacked, brutalized, and raped by officers of the New York City Police Department (NYPD) after he was arrested outside a Brooklyn nightclub. His injuries were so severe that he required three major surgeries.

Officers responsible for the attack were charged and convicted in federal court; Justin Volpe was sentenced to 30 years in prison. He was released from prison early in 2023. In 2001, Louima received a US$8.75 million settlement (equivalent to about $16 million in 2025) in his civil suit against the city for police brutality, the largest civil settlement at that time for such abuse. He has set up the Abner Louima Foundation to establish a hospital and community centers in Haiti, Florida, and New York for Haitian residents, immigrants, and others in need.

== Background ==
Abner Louima was born and raised in the small community of Thomassin, Haiti. In 1991, at the age of 24, Abner immigrated to the United States, married, and soon fathered one child. By 1997, Abner and family were living in Brooklyn, New York. He had been trained as an electrical engineer in Haiti, but in New York, he was unable to get a position related to his education. He found a job as a security guard for a water and sewage plant in the Flatlands area of Brooklyn, New York. Before the end of 1997, Abner was a naturalized citizen of the United States.

== Incident ==
On the night of August 9, 1997, the police were called and several officers from the 70th Precinct were dispatched to the scene where Abner Louima and other men had been involved in a fight between two women in Club Rendez-Vous, a popular nightclub in East Flatbush, Brooklyn. Police, supporters, and various people all became involved in the fight outside the club. Police officers Justin Volpe, Charles Schwarz, Thomas Bruder, and Thomas Wiese, and others responded to the scene. In the ongoing altercation, Volpe said that Louima had attacked him. Louima was charged with disorderly conduct, obstructing government administration, and resisting arrest. Later, Volpe admitted his accusation about Louima being his assailant was a lie.

On the ride to the station, the arresting officers beat Louima with their fists, nightsticks, and hand-held police radios. On arriving at the station house, they had Louima strip-searched and put in a holding cell. The beating continued later, culminating with Louima being sexually assaulted in a bathroom at the 70th Precinct station house in Brooklyn. Volpe kicked Louima in the testicles, and while Louima's hands were cuffed behind his back, he first grabbed onto and squeezed his testicles and then forced a broken broomstick up his rectum. According to trial testimony, Volpe walked through the precinct holding the bloody, excrement-stained instrument in his hand, bragging to a police sergeant that he "took a man down tonight."

Photo of Louima taken after his beating, used in the criminal trial, as Government Exhibit #82

Louima's teeth were also badly damaged in the attack when the broom handle was jammed into his mouth. He testified that a second officer in the bathroom helped Volpe in the assault but could not positively identify him. The identity of the second attacker became a point of serious contention during the trial and appeals. Louima also initially claimed that the officers involved in the attack called him a racial slur and shouted, "This is Giuliani-time" during the beating. Louima later recanted that claim. The reversal was used by police defense lawyers to cast doubt on the entirety of his testimony.

The day after the incident, police took Louima to the emergency department at Coney Island Hospital. Escorting officers explained away his serious injuries, saying they were the result of "abnormal homosexual activities". An Emergency Department (ED) nurse, Magalie Laurent, suspecting that Louima's extreme injuries were not the result of consensual sex, notified Louima's family and the Police Department's Internal Affairs Bureau of the likelihood that he had been raped and beaten in custody. Louima suffered severe internal damage to his colon and bladder in the attack, which required three major operations to repair. He was hospitalized for two months after the incident.

== Public reaction ==
Reports of the incident and the severity of Louima's injuries provoked national outrage. On August 29, 1997, an estimated 7,000 demonstrators marched to the New York City Hall and the 70th Precinct station house at 154 Lawrence Avenue where the attack took place. The march was dubbed "Day of Outrage Against Police Brutality and Harassment".

The case was mentioned in the 1998 Amnesty International report on the United States, among several other cases of police brutality, torture, and abuse. Amnesty International also uses the incident as a case study on a treatise in the campaign against torture.

Mike McAlary, a New York Daily News journalist, investigated and reported an exposé of the brutalization of Louima by NYPD officers. He won the 1998 Pulitzer Prize for distinguished commentary for this reporting.

== Criminal trials ==
Volpe was charged with several counts in federal court of violating Louima's civil rights, obstruction of justice, and making false statements to police; he pleaded "not guilty". Midway through the trial, Volpe changed his plea to guilty, confessing to having sodomized Louima. Although Louima had suffered several broken teeth, Volpe denied that he ever struck him in the mouth with the stick and claimed that he only put it very close to Louima's mouth. Volpe also admitted that he had threatened Louima's life. On December 13, 1999, Volpe was sentenced to 30 years in prison, without the possibility of parole, as well as a $525 fine and restitution in the amount of $277,495.

Charles Schwarz was convicted on June 27, 2000, for helping Volpe assault Louima in the bathroom, and he was sentenced to 15 years in prison. At the time of his conviction, numerous questions were raised about whether he could receive a fair trial in the highly charged atmosphere. Volpe identified Wiese, not Schwarz, as the second man in the bathroom, in a recorded interview on news show 60 Minutes, a fact not brought up in the trial. The conviction was overturned by the US Court of Appeals for the Second Circuit, which found that Schwarz was denied a fair trial due to a conflict of interest by his attorney. However, in 2002, Schwarz pleaded guilty to a perjury charge for testifying that he did not lead Louima to the bathroom, and he was sentenced to five years in prison. His request for leniency was rejected on March 30, 2006. He was released to a halfway house in February 2007, and as of 2019 works in New York City as a carpenter.

Three other NYPD officers (Bruder, Wiese, and Sergeant Michael Bellomo) were indicted for trying to cover up the assault. On March 9, 2000, Wiese and Bruder, along with Schwarz, were convicted on the charge of conspiracy to obstruct a federal investigation into the assault on Louima, but their convictions were reversed by a federal appeals court in February 2002 for insufficient evidence. Bellomo was found not guilty of trying to cover up the beating of Louima and that of another Haitian immigrant by Volpe earlier that evening.

In February 2021, Volpe's request for a COVID-related compassionate release was denied. He was released from prison on April 13, 2023.

Jack Smith, then a young assistant United States Attorney, was one of the prosecutors who worked on these cases.

== Aftermath ==
Louima was represented by attorney Sanford Rubenstein in a subsequent civil suit against the City of New York; this was settled for $8.75 million on July 30, 2001, the largest police brutality settlement in New York City history. After legal fees, Louima collected approximately $5.8 million.

In February 2003, Louima visited his family still living in Haiti. There, he discussed setting up the Abner Louima Foundation, a nonprofit organization to raise additional money to build a community center and hospital in Haiti. Louima indicated he had plans to use his own money and donations to open community centers in Haiti, New York, and Florida for Haitians and others seeking legal, financial or other aid. Louima paid the school tuition for 14 poor children in Thomassin, the small community where he grew up. During his visit to Haiti, he met with the President of Haiti, Jean-Bertrand Aristide, a former priest whom Louima knew from his school days. In a rare interview, Louima said he is convinced that he can make a difference in his impoverished homeland: "Maybe God saved my life for a reason, I believe in doing the right thing."

In 2007, Louima was residing in Miami Lakes, Florida. He owns homes in suburban Miami and Port-au-Prince, and several investment properties in Florida.

Louima has since participated in anti-police brutality protests with Al Sharpton, notably over the killing of Sean Bell in November 2006, and on August 9, 2007, exactly 10 years after his attack. On the latter date, Louima was honored in New York City by the National Action Network (an organization founded by Sharpton), at the House of Justice, for his resolve and for helping others who have suffered from police brutality.

== See also ==
- Joseph Gray (police officer)
- Police brutality in the United States
- Prison rape in the United States
