= Mollen Commission =

1992-1994 commission investigating corruption in the New York City Police Department

The Mollen Commission is formally known as The City of New York Commission to Investigate Allegations of Police Corruption and the Anti-Corruption Procedures of the Police Department. Former judge Milton Mollen was appointed in June 1992 by then New York City mayor David N. Dinkins to investigate corruption in the New York City Police Department. Mollen's mandate was to examine and investigate "the nature and extent of corruption in the Department; evaluate the department's procedures for preventing and detecting that corruption; and recommend changes and improvements to those procedures".

== Members ==
In June 1992, Mayor Dinkins appointed five members to serve on the Mollen Commission :

- Milton Mollen, Chair
- Harold R. Tyler, Jr., Commissioner
- Harold Baer, Jr., Commissioner
- Herbert Evans, Commissioner
- Betsy Barros, Commissioner

== Commission's work and findings ==
In December 1993, The New York Times reported that the "special mayoral panel asserted ... that the New York City Police Department had failed at every level to uproot corruption and had instead tolerated a culture that fostered misconduct and concealed lawlessness by police officers."

Mollen issued a report in July 1994. The conclusion:

Today's corruption is not the corruption of Knapp Commission days. Corruption then was largely a corruption of accommodation, of criminals and police officers giving and taking bribes, buying and selling protection. Corruption was, in its essence, consensual.

Today's corruption is characterized by brutality, theft, abuse of authority, and active police criminality.

The Mollen Commission transcripts and videotapes are housed in the Special Collections of the Lloyd Sealy Library, John Jay College of Criminal Justice.

== See also ==
- Frank Serpico
- Knapp Commission
- Dirty Thirty (NYPD)
- Amadou Diallo
- Abner Louima
- Michael Dowd (police officer)
- New York City Police Department corruption and misconduct
