= Frank Serpico =

American police officer and whistleblower (born 1936)

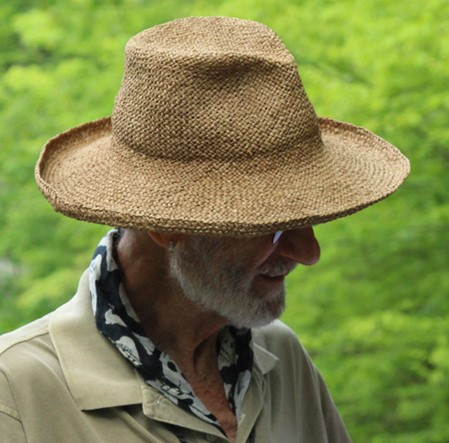
- Serpico in 2013
- Born: Francesco Vincent Serpico; April 14, 1936 (age 90); New York City, New York, U.S.
- Other name: Paco
- Education: City College of New York (BS)
- Known for: Whistleblower on police corruption and subsequent shooting
- Police career
- Department: New York Police Department
- Service years: 1959–1972
- Status: Retired
- Rank: Detective
- Badge no.: 19076
- Shield no.: 761
- Awards: NYPD Medal of Honor
- Other work: Lecturer
- Military career
- Allegiance: United States
- Branch: United States Army
- Service years: 1954–1956
- Conflicts: Korean War

Francesco Vincent "Frank" Serpico (/ˈsɜːrpɪkoʊ/ SUR-pik-oh; born April 14, 1936) is an American retired detective with the New York City Police Department (NYPD), best known for whistleblowing on police corruption. In the late 1960s and early 1970s, Serpico was a plainclothes officer working in Brooklyn, the Bronx and Manhattan to expose vice racketeering. In 1967, he reported credible evidence of widespread corruption in the NYPD, to no effect. In 1970, he contributed to a front-page story in The New York Times on the department's corruption, which drew national attention to the problem. Mayor John Lindsay appointed a five-member panel to investigate accusations of corruption, which became the Knapp Commission.

On February 3, 1971, Serpico was shot in the face during an arrest attempt at 778 Driggs Avenue in the Williamsburg neighborhood of Brooklyn. The bullet severed an auditory nerve, and left fragments lodged near his brain. The circumstances surrounding Serpico's shooting were quickly called into question, raising the possibility that he had been led to the apartment by his colleagues to be murdered. There was no formal investigation, but Edgar Echevarria, who had shot Serpico, was subsequently convicted of attempted murder.

Much of Serpico's fame came after the release of the film Serpico (1973), in which he was portrayed by Al Pacino, based on the book of the same name by Peter Maas. Serpico moved to Europe subsequent to his recovery and testimony before the Knapp Commission. On June 27, 2013, the USA Section of ANPS (National Association of Italian State Police) awarded him the "Saint Michael Archangel Prize". During the ceremony, he gained Italian citizenship and received an Italian passport.

== Early life ==
Frank Serpico was born on April 14, 1936, in the Brooklyn borough of New York City, the youngest child of Vincenzo and Maria Giovanna Serpico, Italian immigrants from Marigliano, Naples, Campania. His older siblings, Pasquale, Salvatore and Tina, were also born in Brooklyn. Serpico attended high school at the prestigious St. Francis Preparatory School and graduated in 1954, according to their online alumni data. In 1954, at the age of 17, he enlisted in the United States Army and was stationed for two years in South Korea as an infantryman. Following his military service, from about 1954 to 1956, he worked as a part-time private investigator and as a youth counselor while attending Brooklyn College. Serpico later received a Bachelor of Science degree from City College of New York.

== Career ==
=== NYPD ===
On September 11, 1959, Serpico joined the New York City Police Department (NYPD) as a probationary patrolman, and became a full patrolman on March 5, 1960. He was assigned to the 81st precinct, then worked for the Bureau of Criminal Identification (BCI) for two years. He was then assigned to plainclothes undercover work, working in Brooklyn, Manhattan and the Bronx.

In 1967, Serpico reported credible evidence of systemic police corruption within the NYPD, and saw no effect until he met another police officer, David Durk, who helped him. He believed his partners in the BCI knew about his secret meetings with internal affairs investigators. Finally, Serpico contributed to an April 25, 1970, front-page story in The New York Times on widespread corruption in the NYPD, which drew national attention. Mayor John V. Lindsay appointed a five-member panel to investigate accusations of corruption; the panel became the Knapp Commission, named after its chairman, Whitman Knapp.

=== Shooting and public interest ===
On February 3, 1971, Serpico was shot during an arrest attempt at 778 Driggs Avenue, in the Williamsburg neighborhood of Brooklyn. Four officers from the Brooklyn North police command had received a tip that a drug deal was about to take place. Two policemen, Gary Roteman and Arthur Cesare, stayed outside while the third, Paul Halley, stood in front of the apartment building. Serpico climbed up a fire escape, entered by the fire escape door, went downstairs, listened for the password, then followed two suspects outside.

Police arrested the young suspects, and found one had two bags of heroin. Halley stayed with the suspects, and Roteman told Serpico, who spoke Spanish, to make a fake purchase in an attempt to get the drug dealers to open the door. The party went to the third-floor landing. Serpico knocked on the door, keeping his hand on his revolver. The door opened a few inches, just far enough to wedge his body in. Serpico called for help, but Roteman and Cesare ignored him. The apartment's occupant, Edgar Echevarria, then shot Serpico in the face with a .22 LR pistol. The bullet struck just below his eye, lodging into the top of his jaw. Serpico fired back, striking Echevarria. He then fell to the floor and began to bleed profusely. Roteman and Cesare refused to make a "10-13" dispatch to police headquarters, indicating that an officer had been shot. An elderly man who lived in an adjacent apartment called emergency services, reporting that a man had been shot, and stayed with Serpico. When a police car arrived, aware that Serpico was a fellow officer, they transported him in the patrol car to Greenpoint Hospital.

The bullet had severed an auditory nerve, leaving Serpico deaf in one ear, and he has since suffered from chronic pain from bullet fragments lodged near his brain. He was visited the day after the shooting by Mayor Lindsay and New York City Police Commissioner Patrick V. Murphy, and police officers harassed him with hourly bed checks. Serpico later testified before the Knapp Commission.

The circumstances surrounding Serpico's shooting were quickly called into question. Serpico, who was armed during the raid, had been shot only after briefly turning away from Echevarria, when he realized that Roteman and Cesare were not following him into the apartment, raising the question whether he had actually been taken to the apartment by his colleagues to be murdered. There was no formal investigation. Echevarria was subsequently convicted of attempted murder. On May 3, 1971, New York Metro Magazine published an article about Serpico, "Portrait of an Honest Cop", a week before he testified before the Knapp Commission of an NYPD lieutenant accused of taking bribes from gamblers.

=== Testimony before the Knapp Commission ===
In October and December of 1971, Serpico testified before the Knapp Commission:

Through my appearance here today ... I hope that police officers in the future will not experience ... the same frustration and anxiety that I was subjected to ... for the past five years at the hands of my superiors ... because of my attempt to report corruption. I was made to feel that I had burdened them with an unwanted task. The problem is that the atmosphere does not yet exist, in which an honest police officer can act ... without fear of ridicule or reprisal from fellow officers. Police corruption cannot exist unless it is at least tolerated ... at higher levels in the department. Therefore, the most important result that can come from these hearings ... is a conviction by police officers that the department will change. In order to ensure this ... an independent, permanent investigative body ... dealing with police corruption, like this commission, is essential ...

Serpico was the first police officer in the history of the NYPD to step forward to report and subsequently testify openly about widespread payoffs to corrupt officers amounting to millions of dollars.

=== Retirement ===
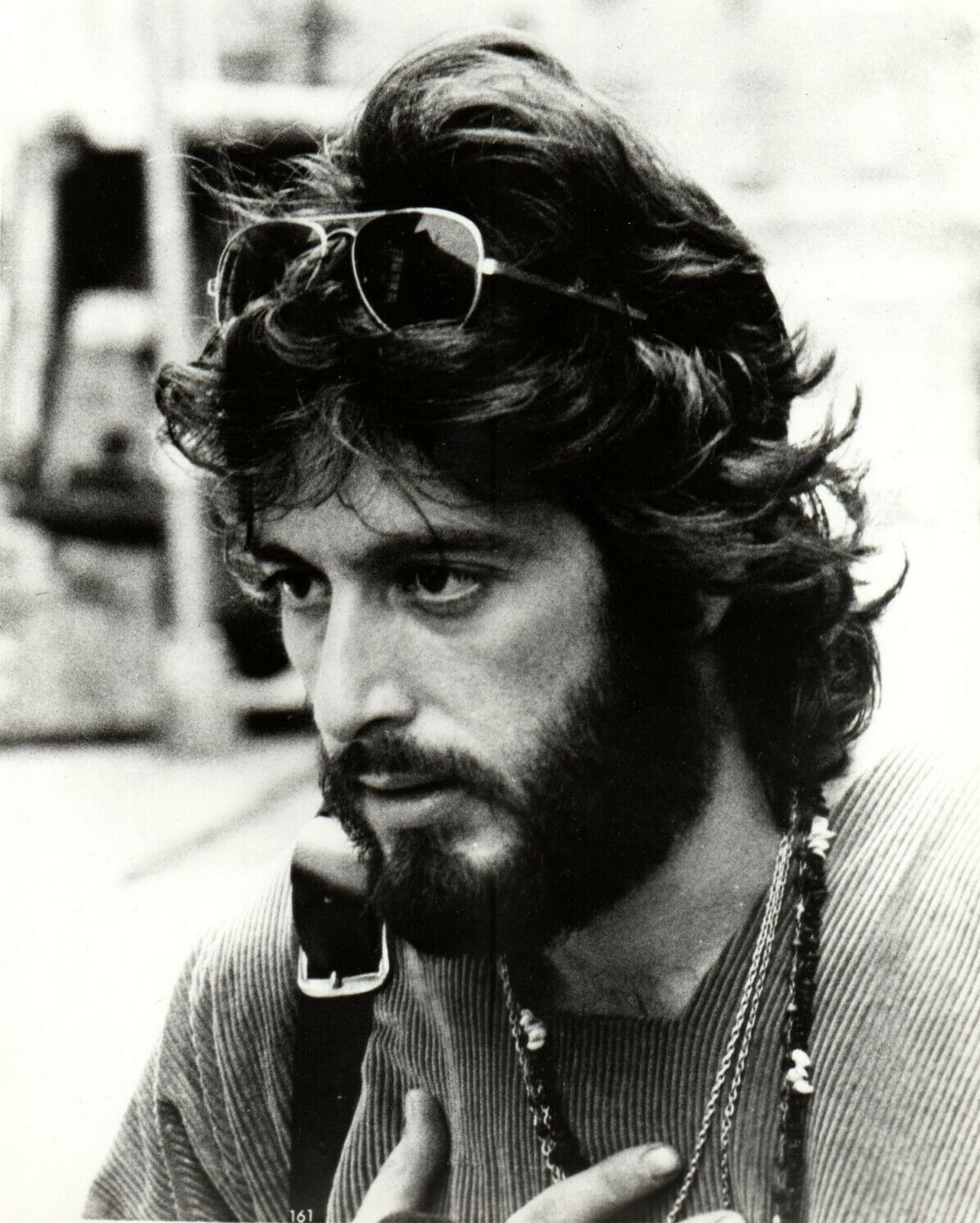
Al Pacino portraying Serpico in Serpico (1973)

Serpico retired on June 15, 1972, one month after receiving the NYPD's highest commendation, the Medal of Honor. There was no ceremony; according to Serpico, it was simply handed to him over the desk "like a pack of cigarettes". In 2014, Serpico stated that the department still had not issued him the certificate that normally would accompany the medal.

In December 2021, Eric Adams, then mayor-elect of New York City and a former NYPD officer, said "[Serpico's] bravery inspired my law enforcement career" and said that he would ensure that the omission was corrected. On February 3, 2022, exactly fifty-one years after the shooting, Serpico received the certificate, which he greeted with an improvised "21-gun salute" made with the sound of popping bubble wrap.

When it was decided to make the movie about Serpico's life, Al Pacino invited him to stay at a house that Pacino had rented in Montauk, Long Island. Pacino asked Serpico about why he had stepped forward, to which he replied, "Well, Al, I don't know. I guess I would have to say it would be because... if I didn't, who would I be when I listened to a piece of music?" Serpico has credited his grandfather (who had once been assaulted and robbed), and his uncle (a respected policeman in Italy), for his own sense of justice.

=== Effect on the NYPD ===
As a result of Serpico's efforts, some have claimed that the NYPD has drastically changed. Michael Armstrong, who was counsel to the Knapp Commission and went on to become chairman of the Commission to Combat Police Corruption, observed in 2012, "the attitude throughout the department seems fundamentally hostile to the kind of systemized graft that had been a way of life almost forty years ago". The Commission has become a permanent advisory body, and in its 2018 report while noting that there has been progress on NYPD corruption and transparency, offered thirteen suggestions covering a range of reporting, transparency and adjudication procedures. In its 2022 interim response report, the NYPD responded to five of these suggestions, rejecting three as inappropriate or unnecessary. Serpico disagrees that the Commission has made a meaningful difference to NYPD culture, stating in 2010: "An honest cop still can't find a place to go and complain without fear of recrimination. The blue wall will always be there because the system supports it."

Among police officers, Serpico's actions are still controversial, but Eugene O'Donnell, professor of police studies at John Jay College of Criminal Justice, said in 2011 that "he becomes more of a heroic figure with every passing year".

== Later life ==
Following his retirement from the NYPD in 1972, Serpico left the United States and moved to Switzerland. In 1973, while living in the Netherlands, he became involved with a woman named Marianne whom he wed in a "spiritual marriage" and called her his "true soul mate"; she later died from cancer. In 1979, Serpico moved to the Welsh town of Corwen, where he became affiliated with Orissor College. In 1980, after a disagreement with the college, Serpico returned to New York City.

Upon his return to the U.S., Serpico reportedly became involved with a woman known only as "L. Pamela P." through the court system. She claimed they have a biological son together, Alexander Serpico, born March 15, 1980, and sued him for child support. Serpico contested the child support order, claiming that the mother told him she was on the contraceptive pill, an allegation she denied, but her friend testified against her in court. He lost his case on appeal and a tribunal ruled he had to pay $945 per month. Serpico was represented in his suit by Karen DeCrow, former president of the National Organization for Women. Alexander died of a suspected drug overdose on May 12, 2021, aged 41.

=== Activism ===
Serpico returned to the U.S. briefly in June 1974 to deliver a nomination speech for Ramsey Clark, candidate for United States Senator, at the New York State Democratic Party's convention in Niagara Falls. Clark was nominated, but lost the general election to incumbent Republican Jacob Javits. In 2015, Serpico himself unsuccessfully ran for a seat on the town board of Stuyvesant, New York, where he lives.

Serpico still speaks out on issues related to police corruption, police brutality and civil liberties, such as attempted official cover-ups following Abner Louima's torture in 1997 and Amadou Diallo's shooting in 1999. He provides support to "individuals who seek truth and justice even in the face of great personal risk", calling them "lamp lighters"; he prefers that term in place of the more conventional "whistleblower", which refers to alerting the public to danger, in the spirit of Paul Revere's midnight ride during the American Revolutionary War.

On August 19, 2017, Serpico gave a speech which was broadcast live on Facebook, standing alongside a group of NYPD officers at the foot of the Brooklyn Bridge, in support of football player Colin Kaepernick's protests against police brutality. Serpico stated, "I am here to support anyone who has the courage to stand up against injustice and oppression anywhere in this country and the world."

On June 27, 2013, the USA Section of ANPS (National Association of Italian State Police) assigned him the "Saint Michael Archangel Prize", an official award by the Italian State Police with the Sponsorship of the Italian Ministry of Interior. During the ceremony, he received his first Italian passport. He was granted citizenship after extended research by the president of ANPS USA, Chief Inspector Cirelli, who established the jus sanguinis or "right of blood". This legal principle, common in Europe, determines citizenship based on the nationality of a person's parents and, thus, allowed him to gain Italian citizenship.

== Media depictions ==
In 1973, Peter Maas published a biography called Serpico, which was adapted into a film of the same name, directed by Sidney Lumet and starring Al Pacino in the title role. Pacino received widespread praise for his performance and was nominated for an Academy Award. In 1976 David Birney starred as Serpico in a television film called Serpico: The Deadly Game that was produced by Dino De Laurentiis Corporation, Emmett G. Lavery Jr. Productions, and Paramount Television. The film was broadcast by NBC and served as a pilot for a television series called Serpico. In 2017, a documentary about Serpico titled Frank Serpico was released.

== See also ==
- New York City Police Department corruption and misconduct
- Adrian Schoolcraft, secretly recorded police conversations from 2008 to 2009
- Robert Leuci, known for his work exposing corruption in the police department and the criminal justice system
