= Knapp Commission =

1970s New York City investigative committee

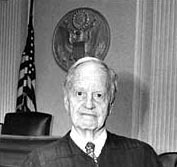
Judge Whitman Knapp

The Commission to Investigate Alleged Police Corruption (known informally as the Knapp Commission after its chairman Whitman Knapp) was a five-member panel formed in May 1970 by Mayor John V. Lindsay to investigate corruption and misconduct within the New York City Police Department (NYPD). The creation of the Commission was largely a result of publicized accounts of police wrongdoing, as revealed by Patrolman Frank Serpico and Sergeant David Durk. Lindsay's action was also prompted by a front-page exposé in The New York Times on April 25, 1970 that documented a vast scheme of illicit payments to police officers from businessmen, gamblers and narcotics dealers. In its final report, released in December 1972, the Commission concluded that the NYPD had widespread corruption problems, and made a series of recommendations.

== Members ==
On May 21, 1970, Mayor Lindsay issued an executive order appointing the following five members to serve on the Knapp Commission:

- Whitman Knapp, chair
- Arnold Bauman (later replaced by John E. Sprizzo)
- Joseph Monserrat
- Franklin A. Thomas
- Cyrus Vance

== Investigation and public hearings ==
The Knapp Commission started its investigation in June 1970. Michael F. Armstrong served as chief counsel to the Commission, and Nicholas Scoppetta was associate counsel.

After taking private testimony for over a year, the Knapp Commission initiated public hearings on October 18, 1971. In addition to interviewing "lamplighters" (whistleblowers) Serpico and Durk, the Commission heard testimony from former Police Commissioner Howard R. Leary, corrupt patrolmen, and victims of police shakedowns. As a result of the testimony of these witnesses, criminal indictments against corrupt police officials were handed down.

Concurrent with the Knapp Commission inquiry, Mayor Lindsay directed Police Commissioner Patrick V. Murphy to implement NYPD reforms. These included proactive integrity checks, large-scale transfers of senior personnel, mandatory job rotation in key areas, ensuring sufficient funds to pay informants, and cracking down on citizen attempts at bribery.

On June 15, 1972, Whitman Knapp was nominated by President Richard M. Nixon to be a federal judge for the Southern District of New York. However, Knapp stayed with the Commission through the end of the year to complete the work.

== Recommendations ==
The Knapp Commission issued a preliminary report in August 1972, and a final report in December 1972. In its final report, the Commission found widespread corruption in the NYPD, and made the following recommendations:

- hold commanders accountable for their subordinates' actions.
- require commanders to file periodic reports on key areas that would breed corruption.
- create field offices of the Internal Affairs division in all precincts.
- place undercover informants in all precincts.
- improve screening and selection methods and standards.
- strive to change police attitudes toward corruption.
- enlist public support in the battle against corruption.

=== "Grass Eaters" and "Meat Eaters" ===
The Knapp Commission Report on Police Corruption categorized two types of corrupt police officer: "Grass Eaters" and "Meat Eaters". This classification scheme distinguished petty corruption under peer pressure ("eating grass") from aggressive, premeditated major corruption ("eating meat").

The term "Grass Eaters" described police officers who "accept gratuities and solicit five, ten, twenty dollar payments from contractors, tow-truck operators, gamblers, and the like but do not pursue corruption payments". "Grass eating" was something that a significant number of officers were guilty of, and which they learned to do from other cops or from imitating the deviants they watched and investigated every day. The Commission concluded that "grass eating" was used by NYPD officers to prove their loyalty to the "brotherhood", and with that came incentives like side jobs. One method to prevent cops from becoming corrupt was to remove the veteran cops who indulge in corrupt practices. Without veteran cops to emulate, new officers might never learn to "eat grass".

"Meat Eaters" described officers who "spend a good deal of time aggressively looking for situations they can exploit for financial gain". An example was shaking down pimps and illicit drug dealers for money. The Commission noted that Meat Eaters "justified this extortion by marginalizing their victims as criminals and undeserving of police protection."

== See also ==
- Serpico
- Mollen Commission
- Royal Commission into the New South Wales Police Service in Australia, held from 1994 to 1997
- Fitzgerald Inquiry
- Police corruption
- Political corruption
- Police brutality
- New York City Police Commissioner
- New York City Police Department corruption and misconduct
