= NAGE EMS =

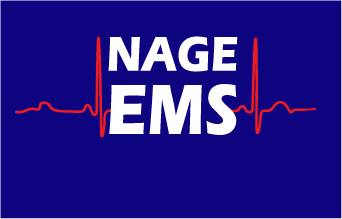
- Founded: 2012
- Headquarters: Quincy, MA - Headquarters
- Location: United States
- Key people: David J. Holway, President. Phillip Petit, Division Director
- Affiliations: NAGE, SEIU, CTW
- Website: www.NAGE-EMS.org

NAGE EMS is a labor union, a division of NAGE / SEIU Local 5000 (National Association of Government Employees) that represents EMS professionals working for private ambulance (Emergency Medical Services, EMT, Paramedic, Dispatcher, Registered Nurses, Support Staff) in self-autonomous union locals. NAGE EMS locals elect their own local governing executive boards and officers and are provided representational, legal, contract, and political support by NAGE but govern and manage their own affairs.

== History ==
NAGE EMS was created by NAGE in 2012 by NAGE leaders to address the unique, complicated conditions that EMS professionals must navigate and to address the perceived negative effects of changes in EMS on the EMS professionals providing services to the public. NAGE believed the privatization push that began 20 years ago in EMS led to private companies supplying a significant part of the public safety network with 911 emergency and non-emergency services to communities. The NAGE EMS division was codified into the NAGE National Bylaws at the 2014 NAGE National Convention

“Corporate and privately owned EMS has grown over the past few years, and that increases the downward pressure on compensation for those hard working employees. Our mission at NAGE EMS is to help those employees through superior union representation, strong contracts, and safe working conditions for NAGE EMS members and the people they serve.” - David J. Holway, NAGE President on NAGE EMS.

== Politics ==
NAGE EMS locals set their own political positions and advocate for their own political positions. Because NAGE EMS is a division of NAGE / SEIU Local 5000, NAGE EMS locals gain access to the political resources of NAGE. Because NAGE is affiliated with SEIU, NAGE gains access to the political resources of SEIU. NAGE EMS locals rely on these resources to help advance their own political agendas and issues. NAGE EMS locals also participate in COPE (Committee On Political Education). COPE is a voluntary political action fund that supports NAGE EMS political and legislative activities. COPE contributions are used to support grassroots lobbying efforts and help elect local, state and federal candidates who support the collective bargaining agreements, issues and concerns of NAGE EMS members.

NAGE, on behalf of NAGE EMS locals is on the congressional record in California as being opposed to California Senate Bill 556, a bill that would require EMS professionals working for a private ambulance company performing public safety services (911 emergency services) under a public contract to wear specific labels. NAGE requested California Governor Brown veto the bill.

== Critics ==
Some critics of NAGE EMS claim that NAGE EMS is actually the IAEP (International Association of EMTs and Paramedics, another division of NAGE) in disguise or that NAGE EMS is some form of re-branding of IAEP. NAGE claims that "NAGE has two EMS divisions. The IAEP represents public, third-service, and private EMS across the U.S. NAGE EMS is focused specifically on private EMS."

Some critics of NAGE EMS claim that NAGE EMS was created after a failed affiliation between NAGE and NEMSA National Emergency Medical Services Association (NEMSA). NAGE claims "NAGE tried to address issues specific to private EMS in several ways, including affiliating with other unions. Finally, the NAGE Board of Directors chose to create a NAGE division specifically to address issues related to private EMS."
