= Police unions in the United States =

Police unions in the United States include a large number and patchwork variety of organizations. Of those unions which conduct labor negotiations on behalf of its police members, 80% are independent and have no affiliation to any larger organized labor groups. There were a reported 800,000 sworn officers in the United States as of 2017, and an estimated 75–80% of them belonged to a union.

Many of the independent unions serve police in local municipalities. The self-described "largest municipal police union in the world" is the Police Benevolent Association of the City of New York that represents 24,000 members of the NYPD. There is no single dominant national association. Four associations have significant membership drawn from across the country. The Fraternal Order of Police has a reported 330,000 members, although the FOP encompasses both union lodges and fraternal lodges, and while active as an advocacy group is not itself officially a union. The largest national union per se is the International Union of Police Associations, with about 20,000 members, which is among that 20% of police unions with affiliations to organized labor. The IUPA chartered with the AFL–CIO in 1979. Likewise the International Brotherhood of Police Officers has a national scope, and is a member organization of the National Association of Government Employees, which is itself affiliated with the Service Employees International Union.

The history of police labor organization in the U.S., under the hand of Samuel Gompers and the American Federation of Labor, began in June 1919. Within four months an ill-advised strike by the freshly chartered Boston Police Department resulted in four days of public disorder, nine deaths, and widespread property damage. Woodrow Wilson declared that the strike was a "crime against civilization", and Calvin Coolidge telegrammed Gompers, "There is no right to strike against the public safety by anybody, anywhere, any time." For decades afterward, police and other public employees were prevented from organizing. Only in the 1960s did most state laws change to allow public-sector employees the right to collective bargaining.

In recent times police unions have been characterized as impediments to organizational reform, and as hindrances in attempts to discipline police officers involved in misconduct. Unions frequently oppose criminal justice reform proposals, as well as have promoted rioting and strikes when governments introduce organizational reforms.

== Structure ==
Police are still highly unionized in the United States in the 21st century, in contrast to the declining union membership of other professions in both the public and private sectors. High union membership rates among police and other law enforcement officers significantly raise the average.

The police labor movement is divided into two camps -- the independent police labor organizations and the police labor organizations affiliated with organized labor through the AFL-CIO or CtW. Approximately 80-85 percent of all police labor organizations would be classified as independent and have no affiliation with organized labor. There are no accurate reports on how many of the 800,000 sworn officers are members of a police union. The best estimate would be 75-80 percent; that would rank police officers with firefighters as having the highest unionization rates in the United States.

The New York City Police Department is the largest in the country. With roughly 35,000 sworn officers, it's three times larger than the next-biggest, Chicago. It supports five separate unions, according to various ranks (patrol officers, sergeants, lieutenants, detectives, and captains):

- Police Benevolent Association of the City of New York, which describes itself as the "largest municipal police union in the world" representing 24,000 members "who hold the rank of Police Officer". Between 1999 and 2023, its leader was Patrick Lynch.
- Detectives' Endowment Association, which claims representation of 5,500 active and 12,000 retired New York City Police Detectives.
- Sergeants Benevolent Association
- Lieutenants Benevolent Association
- Captains' Endowment Association, representing the ranks of Captain, Deputy Inspector, Inspector, Deputy Chief, and Surgeon

The other four cities in the U.S. with over 5,000 police officers correspond with the four next-largest independent municipal labor unions by total membership:

- Chicago Lodge #7 of the Fraternal Order of Police
- Los Angeles Police Protective League
- Philadelphia Lodge #5 of the FOP
- Houston Police Officers' Union

=== Police associations and organized labor ===
Of the 20 to 25% of police unions with affiliations with organized labor, the largest is the International Union of Police Associations, which chartered with the AFL–CIO in 1979. It has over 15,000 members.

Other union affiliates include the International Brotherhood of Police Officers, which is part of National Association of Government Employees (SEIU/CtW).

Amid calls to remove police from the labor movement in 2020, member affiliates of the west coast King County Labor Council brought two motions to reform and / or expel the Seattle Police Officer Guild, the largest police union in the northwest. On June 8, 2020, the Writers Guild of America, East called on the AFL-CIO to dismiss the IUPA.

Sometimes described as a "union," the National Association of Police Organizations is solely a lobbying organization.

=== Police Benevolent Associations ===
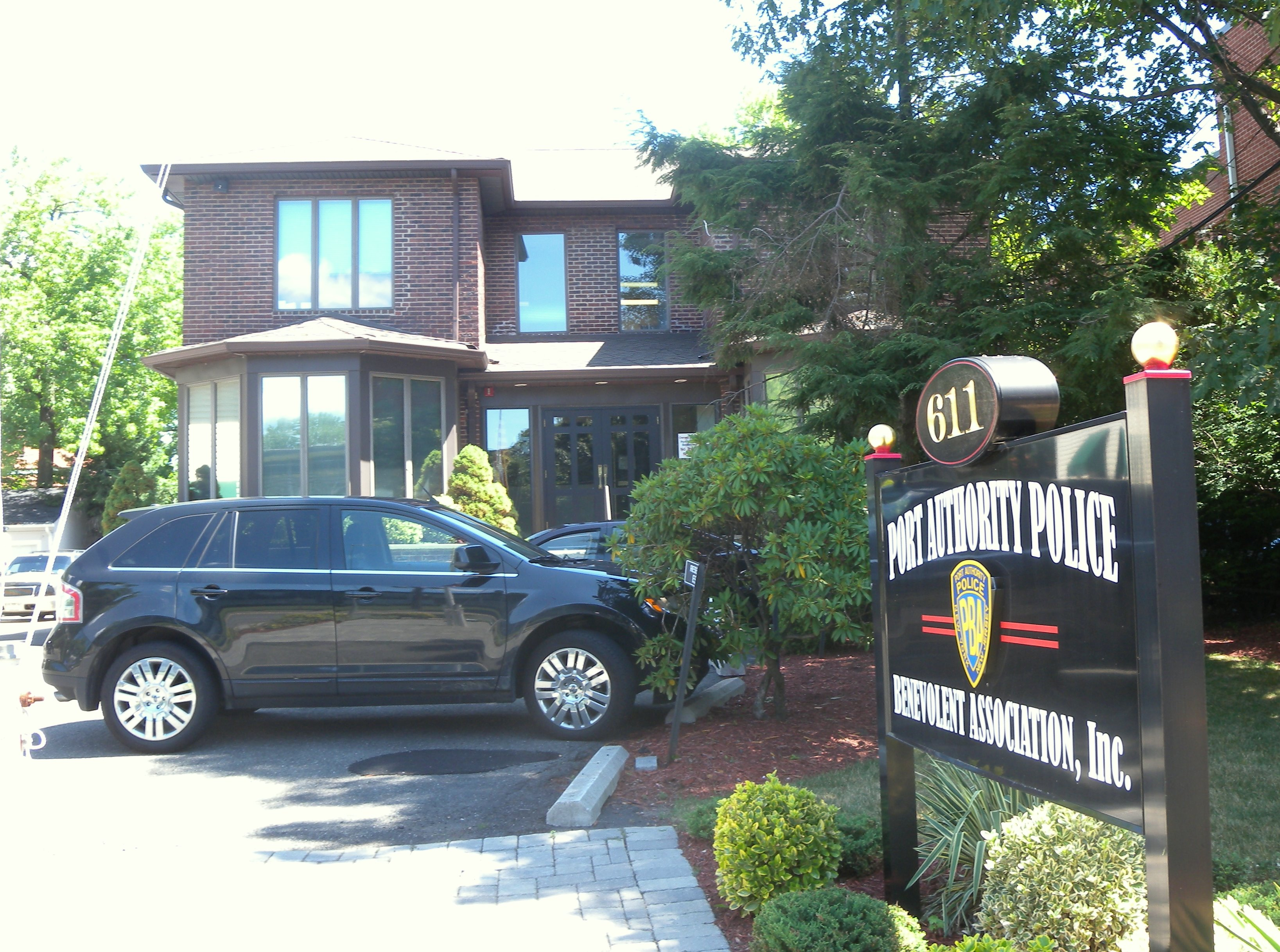
Port Authority Police Benevolent Association, Englewood Cliffs, New Jersey, a typical small-town PBA.

A Police Benevolent Association, or Policemen's Benevolent Association, or Patrolmen's Benevolent Association (PBA), is a frequently used name for law enforcement labor unions in the U.S. Examples include the New Jersey State Policemen's Benevolent Association, the Police Benevolent Association of the City of New York, the Ohio Patrolmen's Benevolent Association, the Boston Police Patrolmen's Association, and the Cleveland Police Patrolmen's Association.

==== Courtesy cards ====
Several Police Benevolent Associations have a tradition of distributing courtesy cards to friends and family members of police officers which allows them to violate laws with impunity. In 2012, the director of the Police Institute at Rutgers University stated that the practice was at least 40 years old and probably much older. While police departments have repeatedly denied that they support favoritism for cardholders, the cards have come to be called "get out of jail free cards" colloquially based on anecdotal reports that they have helped drivers receive a warning instead of a speeding ticket. Officers speaking anonymously have supported the view that the cards are designed to help certain people avoid minor citations.

The legitimacy of the cards is a subject of debate with critics maintaining that it is a form of police corruption for officers to take them into consideration. A professor of police studies at John Jay College of Criminal Justice has said of the system that "it sets up different sets of rules". In 2018, the number of PBA cards allotted per officer in New York was lowered from 30 to 20. This was in response to many of them appearing for sale online. The New York Times prohibits its journalists from accepting the cards out of concerns that doing so would prevent them from covering the police objectively.

In May 2023, NYPD officer Mathew Bianchi filed a lawsuit against his police captain and the City of New York, claiming the police department retaliated against him for his opposition to the PBA's courtesy cards. It alleged the NYPD violated Bianchi's first amendment right to speak out against "widespread corruption, illegal practices and the manipulation of issuance" of traffic tickets through the cards. Specifically, Bianchi claimed that his decision to ticket some cardholders led to the PBA threatening to drop his union protection, and that he was ultimately reassigned from his traffic unit on Staten Island to a night patrol shift after he ticketed a friend of NYPD Chief Jeffrey Maddrey; Bianchi described that stop as "unremarkable" and said the friend did not mention she knew Maddrey.

=== Lobbying and activism ===
In addition to collective bargaining on behalf of their members, police unions engage in political advocacy around "law and order," crime legislation and legal protections for individual officers. Efforts by the Department of Justice to regulate policing through consent decree, civilian oversight, and prosecution of police misconduct have been stalled or forbidden by police union contracts. In 2014, the Fraternal Order of Police lobbied unsuccessfully for the continuation of Pentagon's 1033 program, which allowed for excess military equipment to be given to civilian police departments, after it was discontinued by President Obama.

Police unions also generate significant political donations. Between 1994 and 2020, over 55 police unions donated $1 million to different federal election campaigns. In the same time period, over $87 million was spent by police unions on lobbying and elections on the local level.

== History of police unionization ==
In 1892, the Police Benevolent Association of the City of New York (PBA) formed in New York City, originally as a fraternal organization. Today it represents about 24,000 of the department's 36,000 officers. Another 11,000 are represented by the Sergeants Benevolent Association.

In 1915, the first chapter of the Fraternal Order of Police was formed in Pittsburgh. As a national organization, some of its lodges are independent municipal unions, but the FOP is not a labor union nor affiliated with any. It remains open to all levels of law enforcement members, including management.

In June 1919 the American Federation of Labor (Note: In 1955 the AFL and CIO merged to form the AFL–CIO) began chartering local police organizations as affiliates. The first was the police force of Knoxville, Tennessee, followed by cities such as Cincinnati, Washington DC, Los Angeles, St. Paul, Fort Worth, and Boston. By September it had granted charters to police unions in 37 cities, over the protests of city officials reluctant to allow unionized public employees, and the protests of existing union members resistant to admitting police to their ranks.

This set the stage for the catastrophic Boston Police Strike of 1919. The Boston force had informally organized since 1906 as the "Boston Social Club". They applied for an AFL charter, which was newly granted on August 15. The city and state, with shared oversight, both forbade this, and rejected a compromise. On September 9, some 72% of the police force refused to work. The city descended into four days and nights of lawlessness, with widespread property damage and nine killed outright, eight of them by members of the 5,000 Massachusetts State Guard ordered in by Governor Calvin Coolidge. More than 1000 officers were fired and replaced by the city at the higher salaries the union had struck for. The event had a pronounced chilling effect on police unionization for decades. The Boston Police Patrolmen's Association was formed 46 years later, in 1965, following a change in state law. A national police union would not be approved until the International Union of Police Association in 1979. (Note: IUPA was first organized in 1963)

In 1935, the Wagner Act was passed by president Franklin D. Roosevelt, allowing private sector employees to collectively bargain. It wasn't until later in the 1960s that many US states changed laws to allow public-sector employees the right to collective bargaining. By the 1970s police were unionized in every major US city.

The longest continuously operating police union in the country is the Portland Police Association of Portland, Oregon, established in 1942.

=== Endorsements ===
Police Unions in the United states tend to endorse the Republican Party.

On September 16, 2016, the Fraternal Order of Police endorsed Republican candidate Donald Trump for U.S. president. It endorsed Trump again on September 4, 2020. On August 18, 2020, the Police Benevolent Association of the City of New York endorsed Trump for President in the 2020 United States presidential election.

== Controversy ==
Growing controversy surrounds the impact of police labor unions on law enforcement behavior. Police unions have been described as an impediment to organizational reform and as organizations that hinder discipline for officers involved in misconduct.

In the wake of the police murder of George Floyd, academics from the Columbia Law Review have begun to reexamine the nature of police unions, qualified immunity, and their continued viability in America. Additionally, the level of power commanded by police unions has been described by academics as "concerning" and "preventing justice" by way of preventing or impeding the public from examining the employment history of officers.

These unions have also been identified as an ironic obstacle to the stated purpose of "to protect and serve".

Academics cite a link with perceived police union corruption and their shielding of "dirty" officers by organized labor.
