= Public-sector trade unions in the United States =

A public-sector trade union (or public-sector labor union) is a trade union which primarily represents the interests of employees within public sector or governmental organizations.

The 1935 National Labor Relations Act enshrined the right of workers to form unions and engage in collective bargaining, but it specifically excluded public sector workers. Legal protections for public sector unions were enshrined with President John F. Kennedy’s 1962 Executive Order 10988 and a wave of state-level legislation in the late 1950s to the early 1980s.

Even though legal protections varied between private and public workers, there were many public sector unions at the local level in the first half of the 20th century. For instance, the Fraternal Order of Police (FOP) and the International Association of Fire Fighters (IAFF) were established in 1915 and 1918 respectively.

== History ==
Labor unions initially bypassed government employees because those government worker positions were managed by the patronage system used by the political parties before the arrival of civil service.

=== Postal unions ===
Post Office workers did form unions. The National Association of Letter Carriers started in 1889 and grew quickly. It had 52 branches with 4,600 members in 1890, and 335 branches by 1892. It focused on forcing postmasters to honor federal law mandating an 8-hour day for federal employees. In 1893 it won a Supreme Court decision and $3.5 million in back overtime pay. Local postmasters vigorously opposed the union. It joined the American Federation of Labor (AFL) in 1917. By the mid-1960s it had 175,000 members in 6,400 local branches.

Two organizations of postal clerks emerged in the 1890s; they merged in 1899 into the United National Association of Post Office Clerks (UNAPOC). It was too conservative for the AFL, which in 1906 sponsored the National Federation of Post Office Clerks (NFPOC), which soon surpassed the UNAPOC. NFPOC grew from 16,000 members in 1922 to 36,000 in 1932, to almost 50,000 by 1940. It did not engage in strikes, but spent much of its efforts in opposing hostile Congressional legislation. Additional rivals were formed in the 1930s but the first serious rival was the National Postal Clerks Union (NPCU) that began in 1958 and by 1970 reach the membership of 80,000. Merger discussions dragged on for years, until the NFPOC, UNMAPOC and others merged in 1961 as the United Federation of Postal Clerks. Another round of mergers in 1971 produced the American Postal Workers Union (APWU). In 2012 the APWU had 330,000 members.

The postal unions did not engage in strikes, but there was the U.S. postal strike of 1970, a two-week wildcat walkout in New York City and 12 other cities by 200,000 of the 750,000 postal employees. It was not officially sponsored and ended when the Army started delivering the mail in "Operation Graphic Hand."

=== 1919 ===
Historian Joseph Slater, says, "Unfortunately for public sector unions, the most searing and enduring image of their history in the first half of the twentieth century was the Boston police strike. The strike was routinely cited by courts and officials through the end of the 1940s." It came in the strike-ridden year of 1919 when the Boston city police formed a union, affiliated with the AFL, and walked out on strike. A severe popular backlash came as looting of stores and street violence broke out that terrorized citizens. Governor Calvin Coolidge sent in the National Guard; there were hundreds of casualties and at least nine deaths. Coolidge broke the strike and the legislature took control of the police away from city officials. The episode made Coolidge nationally famous--he became the Republican nominee for Vice president in 1920.

The police strike chilled union interest in the public sector in the 1920s. The major exception was the emergence of unions of public school teachers in the largest cities; they formed the American Federation of Teachers (AFT), affiliated with the AFL. In suburbs and small cities, the National Education Association (NEA) became active, but it insisted it was not a labor union but a professional organization.

Police unions in the United States revived in the 1960s and 1970s after enabling state and federal legislation.

=== New Deal era ===
Unionization remained uncommon among government employees outside the Post Office. In the mid 1930s efforts were made to unionize WPA workers, but were opposed by President Franklin D. Roosevelt. Moe points out that Roosevelt, "an ardent supporter of collective bargaining in the private sector, was opposed to it in the public sector." Roosevelt in 1937 told the nation what the position of his government was:

All Government employees should realize that the process of collective bargaining, as usually understood, cannot be transplanted into the public service. It has its distinct and insurmountable limitations when applied to public personnel management. The very nature and purposes of government make it impossible for administrative officials to represent fully or to bind the employer in mutual discussions with government employee organizations. The employer is the whole people, who speak by means of laws enacted by their representatives in Congress. Accordingly, administrative officials and employees alike are governed and guided, and in many instances restricted, by laws which establish policies, procedures, or rules in personnel matters. Particularly, I want to emphasize my conviction that militant tactics have no place in the functions of any organization of government employees. Upon employees in the Federal service rests the obligation to serve the whole people, whose interests and welfare require orderliness and continuity in the conduct of government activities. This obligation is paramount. Since their own services have to do with the functioning of the Government, a strike of public employees manifests nothing less than an intent on their part to prevent or obstruct the operations of Government until their demands are satisfied. Such action, looking toward the paralysis of Government by those who have sworn to support it, is unthinkable and intolerable.

The Wagner Act of 1935 facilitated unions in the private sector but did not apply to the public sector in state or local government, since the federal government could not interfere in state government.

=== "Little New Deal" era ===
Change came in the 1950s. In 1958 New York mayor Robert Wagner, Jr. issued an executive order, called "the little Wagner Act," giving city employees certain bargaining rights, and gave their unions with exclusive representation (that is, the unions alone were legally authorized to speak for all city workers, regardless of whether or not some workers were members.) Management complained but the unions had power in city politics.

The first U.S. state to permit collective bargaining by public employees was Wisconsin, in 1959. Collective bargaining is now permitted in three fourths of U.S. states. By the 1960s and 1970s public-sector unions expanded rapidly to cover teachers, clerks, firemen, police, prison guards and others. In 1962, President John F. Kennedy issued Executive Order 10988, upgrading the status of unions of federal workers.

=== Recent years ===
After 1960 public sector unions grew rapidly and secured good wages and high pensions for their members. While manufacturing and farming steadily declined, state- and local-government employment quadrupled from 4 million workers in 1950 to 12 million in 1976 and 16.6 million in 2009. Adding in the 3.7 million federal civilian employees there were 20 million government employees. In 2010 8.4 million government workers were represented by unions, including 31% of federal workers, 35% of state workers and 46% of local workers. In 2010, Daniel DiSalvo argued that public sector unions led to significant strains on budgets due in part to paying unionized employees significantly more than equivalent private sector positions, and should be curtailed.

In 2009 the U.S. membership of public sector unions surpassed membership of private sector unions for the first time, at 7.9m and 7.4m respectively.

In 2011 states faced a growing fiscal crisis and the Republicans had made major gains in the 2010 elections. Public sector unions came under heavy attack especially in Wisconsin, as well as Indiana, New Jersey and Ohio from conservative Republican legislatures. Conservative state legislatures tried to drastically reduce the abilities of unions to collectively bargain. Conservatives argued that public unions were too powerful since they helped elect their bosses, and that overly generous pension systems were too heavy a drain on state budgets.

In 2022, some library staffs were turning to unions for security and social equity.

In 2025, Donald Trump signed Executive Orders 14251 and 14343, which was reported to have led to over 445,000 federal employees losing their union protections.

== Criticism ==
Nicholas Bagley, in a 2026 opinion article in The Atlantic pointed to two reviews of studies of public-sector teachers unions in the United States from 2025 and 2015 as finding that they resulted in similar or worse performance by unionized teachers when compared to non-unionized teachers and at a higher cost to the school districts. Some other specific critiques include instances where police unions shielded sheriff's deputies from accountability for misconduct, where teachers unions prioritized older members at the expense of young teachers starting out including by prioritizing pensions over wages. Bagley believes laws should be passed that do not allow for public-sector unions to bargain over overtime, pensions, work rules and salary schedules, leaving unions to negotiate only over base wages.

In 2026, C.J. Ciaramella writing in Reason reviewed Blue Power by Stuart Schrader that documented the rising power of police unions since the 1969 to accrue more power than other public-sector unions. Ciaramella criticizes the ability of police, which already have a monopoly on physical power in a locality, to accrue more relatively unchecked power through controversial tactics like strikes and changes in enforcement. He argues that the lack of accountability has cost municipalities hundreds of millions in police misconduct settlements.
