= IAEP =

IAEP may refer to:

- International Association of EMTs and Paramedics, a labor union
- International Association for Environmental Philosophy, a philosophical organization and publisher of the academic journal Environmental Philosophy
