= National Emergency Medical Services Association =

Defunct labor union

NEMSA
- Founded: 2004
- Dissolved: 2016
- Headquarters: Modesto, CA
- Location: United States
- Members: 0
- Key people: Torren Colcord, Executive Director

The National Emergency Medical Services Association (NEMSA or National EMS Association) is now defunct, but was a registered labor union and California non-profit mutual benefit corporation. NEMSA's membership consisted of emergency medical technicians (EMTs), flight nurses, and paramedics.

== History ==
The National Emergency Medical Services Association (NEMSA) was founded in 2004 when dissatisfaction with union representation by SEIU Local 250 led to the creation of an all-EMS union. NEMSA's founding was controversial, as founder Torren Colcord was found guilty in Alameda County (CA) Superior Court of fraud, using Service Employee International resources and company time to create and form NEMSA. "It's a substantial judgment for substantial wrongdoing," said Dan Martin, administrative vice president for SEIU-United Healthcare Workers West. "They were on payroll, supposed to be looking out for members, and they did just the opposite. It's an example of what happens when people put their own personal ambitions above the interests of the union."

SEIU was awarded a $442,000 judgement against Colcord, and later Colcord retained the guilty verdict but had the award reduced $300,000 on appeal. NEMSA members later paid for that judgement, plus attorney fees for the appeals case.

NEMSA claimed it was a labor union by EMS workers and for EMS workers. It promoted itself as "a registered labor union and not-for-profit mutual benefit corporation that specializes in the labor representation of pre-hospital EMS Professionals such as EMTs, Paramedics, Dispatchers, Call Takers, Critical Care Nurses, Air Ambulance Flight Nurses and Paramedics, as well as EMS related support staff." NEMSA represented members in six states.

NEMSA affiliated with NAGE (National Association of Government Employees) in 2012. NAGE later severed the affiliation and filed suit against NEMSA for breach of several contracts, claiming NEMSA did not pay NAGE more than $281,000 owed to NAGE as part of those contracts. In an arbitration between NEMSA and NAGE over the severed affiliation agreement, an arbitrator noted "disharmony between the two unions ensued almost immediately after the ink dried on the three contracts." On April 5, 2013, NAGE sent a letter terminating all three agreements with NEMSA. NAGE subsequently began to raid NEMSA's membership and challenge NEMSA's representation of several national bargaining units. In April 2013, NAGE filed suit against NEMSA and Colcord in this Court to recover damages for the alleged contract breaches.

After the affiliation was severed, NEMSA remained an independent non-affiliated labor union however was subject to union raiding from AFSCME, IAFF, NAGE, and other labor unions. NEMSA filed for Chapter 11 bankruptcy on February 6, 2015, ceasing all business operations.

== Membership changes ==
As an independent non- AFL-CIO affiliated union, NEMSA had dramatic changes in membership during the time it operated. NEMSA was both a union that conducted union union raiding of other affiliated unions and was also a victim of union raiding by other unions.

Outside of union raiding activity, in 2007, after difficult contract negotiations in Portland, Oregon, NEMSA disclaimed the Portland bargaining unit, walking away from representing approximately 500 EMS workers there instead of having their recently negotiated contract rejected.

== Leadership dispute and formation of AFSCME Local 4911 ==
In 2010, a dispute over then NEMSA President Torren Colcord's and the NEMSA board of director's leadership of NEMSA led to a long-running dispute over who controlled NEMSA. In 2010, a union officer election was held. The existing board of directors did not recognize the legitimacy of one candidate, and did not place that candidate on the ballot. That candidate ran a national write-in ballot campaign, and received the most votes. The NEMSA board of directors declared the second highest vote-getting candidate to have won the election, who then promptly resigned. Torren Colcord, who received the third most votes, assumed the role of NEMSA executive director per the NEMSA board of directors.

Some NEMSA members filed a complaint with the US Department of Labor. According to the Department of Labor, excluded candidate Jimmy Gambone was eligible to run for office and should have been placed on the ballot. According to the Department of Labor, NEMSA violated federal law in refusing to recognize the eligibility of the candidate who received the most votes and seat Jimmy Gambone as president. NEMSA instead seated another candidate for president.

Torren Colcord, NEMSA's outgoing president, remained in control of NEMSA as executive director. New bylaws were drafted after the election to allow for the executive director position. The DOL investigation and resolution to the complaint took nearly two years.

While the complaint was being investigated by the Department of Labor, Gambone and disaffected NEMSA members broke into the NEMSA headquarters office. Gambone and disaffected NEMSA members then seized power, naming themselves the NEMSA board of directors and unilaterally unseating the existing NEMSA board of directors. Gambone and a group of disaffected NEMSA members then began conducting business as NEMSA while the NEMSA board of directors which Gambone had unseated also continued conducting business as NEMSA. According to NEMSA, Gambone and a group of the disaffected NEMSA members then attempted to intercept dues checks, write checks on NEMSA's bank accounts, and do business as NEMSA during this time. Legal activity led to the original NEMSA board of directors eventually gaining control of NEMSA again. Disaffected NEMSA members including Gambone who participated in the leadership dispute were expelled from NEMSA membership, making Gambone ineligible to be the NEMSA president.

An OLMS supervised election occurred for the NEMSA board of directors. NEMSA then had a new president and board of directors, and Colcord remained executive director.

Gambone and a group of disaffected former NEMSA members went on to form United EMS Workers/AFCSME 4911.

== Critics ==
EMS workers in Portland, Oregon are critical of NEMSA because it disclaimed their bargaining unit when it could not negotiate an acceptable contract for their workforce. NEMSA walked away from approximately 500 members, leaving them unrepresented. "Everybody was upset," Charlie Savoie said. "A faction figured maybe we'd been had, and began collecting petitions to file for new representation by the Teamsters."

Former NEMSA member Edward Gavin Jr. filed a lawsuit against NEMSA in 2011, claiming it had breached its duty of fair representation owed to Gavin under law. "On July 8, 2011 Mr. Gavin found out that at the Step Two grievance hearing he had briefly attended, NEMSA had withdrawn his grievance rather than allowing a decision to be made. The withdrawal of the grievance at the Step Two stage of the grievance process prevented the grievance from being taken to Step Three of the process, arbitration. As a result of the grievance being withdrawn by NEMSA, Mr. Gavin lost the opportunity to have the NEMSA stewards decide whether to take the grievance to arbitration, he lost the opportunity to appeal any decision by NEMSA not to take the grievance over his termination taken to arbitration, he lost the opportunity to have his grievance taken to arbitration, and he lost the opportunity to contest the termination of his employment. Mr. Gavin had never agreed to the withdrawal of the grievance." Gavin received summary judgement against him in US Federal Court.

NEMSA members, as reported by EMS Insider, were critical of NEMSA due to NEMSA not providing board of directors meeting minutes or financial information about NEMSA upon request.
