= Better Chicken Commitment =

Chicken welfare initiative

The Better Chicken Commitment (BCC) is a set of voluntary chicken welfare standards for the food industry. Signatories to the BCC pledge that, by some deadline, broiler chickens in their supply chains must not be stocked too tightly, must be slaughtered using certain methods, and must be from higher-welfare breeds, among other welfare commitments. The European version of the commitment is sometimes called the "European Chicken Commitment."

The BCC was started in 2016 by a coalition of animal welfare groups, in consultation with scientists and industry stakeholders, with the intent to address the largest sources of suffering for farmed chickens. Since then, hundreds of restaurants, manufacturers, retailers, and producers have signed up to the BCC, including large companies like Waitrose, M&S, and Burger King.

The deadline for many companies to fulfill their commitments under the BCC is 2026. However, as early as 2024, animal advocacy organizations began raising concerns that many signatories were not on track to fulfill their commitments, especially after high-profile companies like KFC reneged on their commitments.

== Provisions ==
=== Overview ===
The Better Chicken Commitment generally imposes five requirements, relating to different aspects of welfare. They include requirements with respect to maximum stocking density, environmental conditions, slaughter methods, third-party auditing of compliance, and the use of higher-welfare chicken breeds.

Requirements differ slightly by region. The UK and European requirements include an additional provision that all products abide by EU animal welfare laws and regulations, regardless of where the product is produced.

The provisions are similar to those of the Global Animal Partnership (GAP). However GAP certification does not impose slaughter requirements, and GAP standards around breed only meet the BCC standards if accompanied by the add-on Better Chicken Project certification.

=== Timeline ===
In many cases, companies have pledged to reach full compliance by 2026. However, for some pledges, the BCC site advises that timelines to full completion may be from three to seven years from the date of the pledge.

=== Specific requirements ===
The following are specific requirements of the BCC's US standards.

==== Maximum stocking density ====
The BCC requires that by a set deadline, farms maintain a maximum stocking density of 6.0 lbs. per square foot and prohibit all forms of broiler cages. This standard is intended to reduce overcrowding and allow chickens to move freely, promoting better welfare and reducing stress-related health issues.

==== Environmental conditions ====
All birds must have access to an improved baseline environment that includes at least 3 inches of friable litter covering the floor, continuous light and dark periods, and functional enrichments such as perches or straw bales. These conditions allow chickens to express natural behaviors like scratching, foraging, and resting, which are essential for physical and psychological well-being.

==== Slaughter methods ====
The BCC mandates the use of a multi-step controlled-atmosphere processing system to stun chickens irreversibly, eliminating pre-stun handling. Advocates argue that this method minimizes stress and pain during slaughter.

==== Third-party audits ====
Producers must demonstrate compliance through third-party audits and annual public reporting on their progress toward meeting BCC standards. This is intended to monitor and verify compliance.

==== Higher-welfare breeds ====
Only BCC-approved chicken breeds demonstrating higher welfare outcomes are permitted. These breeds are selected to grow at slower rates, reducing health problems associated with rapid growth. Animal advocates say that ending reliance on fast-growing broiler chickens—called "frankenchickens" by some—will improve welfare and reduce mortality.

The adoption of slower-growing, higher-welfare breeds has been described as the most important component of the BCC for improving welfare. Scientific research has attempted to quantify the impact of complying with the slower-growing breed requirements. Researchers Wladimir J. Alonso and Cynthia Schuck-Paim find that lower-growing breeds experience substantially less pain. In particular, they estimate that adopting higher-welfare breeds reduces "excruciating pain" by 80%, "disabling pain" by 67%, and "hurtful pain" by 25%.

== Signatories and compliance ==
=== North America ===
As of April 2024, over 230 U.S. companies have signed the North American BCC, including Applegate, Blue Apron, Chipotle, HelloFresh, Panera Bread, Perdue Farms, Shake Shack, and Unilever. According to the 2023 U.S. ChickenTrack report, produced by Compassion in World Farming, nine companies, such as Applegate, HelloFresh, and Open Farm, have made measurable progress across all tenets of the BCC, while only two have achieved full compliance. Overall, 22% of signatories publicly report on their progress.

=== Europe ===
As of March 2024, over 380 companies in Europe have signed the BCC, including retailers, restaurants, manufacturers, and food service businesses across eight countries. According to the European ChickenTrack report by Compassion in World Farming, 93 of the most influential companies were tracked, with 55 reporting on their transition progress, including Burger King (France), Domino's Pizza Enterprises (Europe), Carrefour (Poland, Italy, Spain), TGI Fridays (UK), and Premier Foods (UK). Norsk Kylling is the only company to have achieved full compliance across all BCC criteria, while six others—including Marks & Spencer, Waitrose, Danone, Monoprix, Nando's, and Schiever Distribution—report full compliance with at least one criterion. Overall, reporting has increased from 39% in 2022 to 65% in 2023, though many companies are still behind on key measures such as slower-growing breeds and reduced stocking densities.

In May 2024, The Humane League UK disrupted Co-op’s annual general meeting in Manchester to protest the company's use of fast-growing chicken breeds. Activists called on the supermarket chain to fully adopt the Better Chicken Commitment and adopt higher-welfare breeds. Co-op stated it exceeded Red Tractor welfare standards and requires the provision of additional space, but protesters said this did not go far enough.

In March 2025, The Humane League UK protested at 11 KFC locations across the UK and leafletted thousands of households after the company backtracked on its pledge to abide by the BCC. In particular, activists condemned the restaurant chain's continued use of fast-growing “frankenchickens,” which suffer severe health problems. The demonstrations reportedly followed months of dialogue between animal welfare advocates and the company.

In February 2026, eight UK restaurant groups ended their commitment to the BCC. KFC, Burger King, Nando's, Popeyes, Wingstop, and Wagamama instead joined the industry-led Sustainable Chicken Forum (SCF). The SCF said that businesses "no longer believe the BCC is the right framework to drive the next phase of progress on welfare due to the requirement to source only slower-growing breeds".

== Reactions ==
=== Industry ===
A number of businesses and industry groups were involved in the designing of the BCC, and hundreds of businesses have since made the pledge. However, some industry-commissioned reports and industry groups have been critical of the BCC, contending that the BCC does not improve welfare, raises the costs associated with chicken production, and increases greenhouse gas emissions.

=== Animal advocates ===
Many animal advocacy organizations have been involved in designing and advocating for the BCC, including Humane World for Animals, Compassion in World Farming and The Humane League.

The BCC has received criticism from some animal advocates, though, including PETA, who contend that no factory farm is humane, and that the BCC standards do not go far enough.
