= Detectives' Endowment Association =

Police union

- Detectives Endowment Association, City of New York Inc.
- Founded: 1917
- Headquarters: New York City
- Location: United States
- Members: 17,200 (2013)
- Key people: Scott Munro, President
- Website: Detectives' Endowment Association

The Detectives Endowment Association of the City of New York is one of three major police unions representing police officers of the New York City Police Department. The other two being the Police Benevolent Association and Sergeants Benevolent Association.

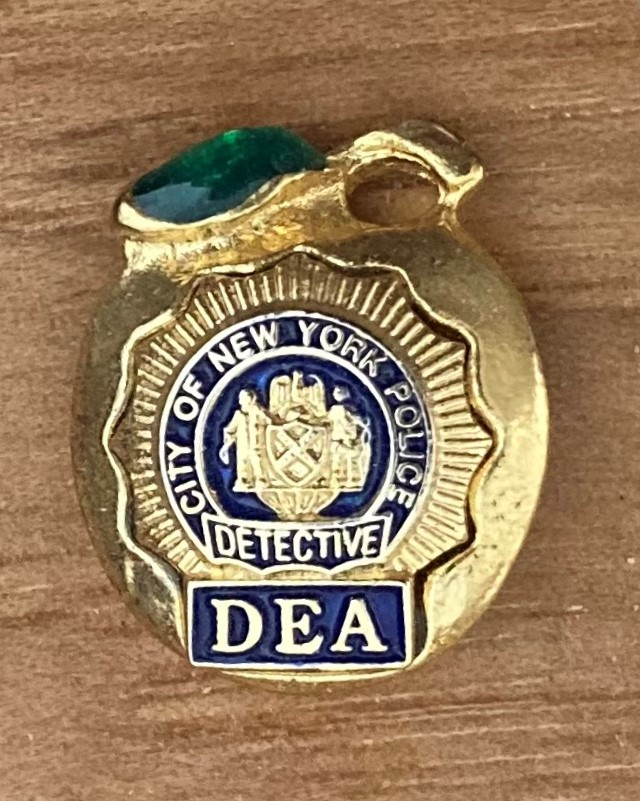
New York City Police Department Detectives Endowment Association lapel pin

== History ==
The Detectives' Endowment Association was founded in 1917 to represent active and retired detectives of the New York City Police Department. In 1963 it was granted independent collective bargaining rights to negotiate on behalf its members.

In 2013 the union won a case in Manhattan Supreme Court over pay discrepancies involving the salary raises for detectives and police officers. Their case was rejected by the Board of Collective Bargaining, but a judge ruled in their favor and the detectives were promised back pay.

In June 2020 three Bronx officers who visited a Manhattan Shake Shack accused the store's employees of poisoning them, saying that a toxic substance had been added to their drinks. The Detectives' Endowment Association went so far as to issue a safety alert on Twitter, claiming that the officers had been "intentionally poisoned." A full investigation by the NYPD vindicated the employees and determined that an improperly cleaned machine left a residue of bleach or a cleaning agent in the officers' beverages. Bleach is a toxin that, in itself, can cause harm to any individual that ingests it.

== Organization and membership ==
The union represents 5,500 active and 12,000 retired New York City Police Detectives. Members of the union and some of their family members are given union membership cards which have been the subject of some controversy. Although the cards are not recognized by the police department, in some cases non-members have purchased them online and used them as a way to avoid traffic tickets. This controversy caused some effort within the New York City Council to ban the membership cards, but as of 2014 they have not been.

== Political advocacy ==
The Detectives' Endowment Association actively participates in politics by endorsing and donating to the campaigns of different politicians. They also employ a registered lobbying firm, Pitta Bishop Del Giorno & Giblin LLC, to lobby on their behalf with the city government. In 2012 they donated over $350,000 to both Republican and Democratic campaigns, with 50% going to Republicans and 48% to Democrats. In 2014 they endorsed New York Attorney General Eric Schneiderman after endorsing his opponent four years earlier, citing Schneiderman's support for increased bulletproof vest distribution, expanded background checks, and combating smart phone crime.

== See also ==
- Police Benevolent Association of the City of New York
- Sergeants Benevolent Association
