= International Brotherhood of Police Officers =

Police union

The International Brotherhood of Police Officers (IBPO) is a police labor union, a member organization of the National Association of Government Employees, which is itself affiliated with the Service Employees International Union. IBPO's sister organization is the International Brotherhood of Correctional Officers (IBCO).

Counting only officers, the union has over 15,000 members.

IBPO's membership is geographically diverse, representing police officers in Boise, Idaho, the members of the Coastal Florida Police Benevolent Association & Public Employees Association, members of the Atlanta Police Department in its southeast regional division, and members of local 105 in Cranston, Rhode Island, where the union was founded in 1964, after a dispute over a test led seven unfairly fired officers to the state legislature, then to the state supreme court, to win reinstatement.

IBPO first joined NAGE in 1970. As of 1983 it was one of four police unions aspiring to a national membership, along with the Fraternal Order of Police, the International Union of Police Associations, and the National Association of Police Organizations.
