= Patrick Lynch (police officer) =

American police union leader and police officer

Patrick J. Lynch
- Born: 1964 (age 61–62); New York City, New York, U.S.
- Other name: Pat
- Occupations: Trade union leader; Police Officer
- Known for: Former President, Police Benevolent Association of the City of New York
- Spouse: Kathleen Casey
- Children: 2

Patrick J. Lynch (born 1964) is a New York City Police Department officer, and the former president of its union, the Police Benevolent Association of the City of New York, which he has served for six consecutive terms in office. He retired as union president at the end of June 2023.

== Personal life ==
Lynch was born in Bayside, Queens to an Irish Catholic family. He is the youngest of seven children. His father was a subway motorman for 30 years. He went to Monsignor Scanlan High School in the Bronx.

Lynch is married to Kathleen Casey, and has two sons, Patrick and Kevin, both of whom are New York City police officers.

== Career ==
On January 4, 1984, Lynch became a police officer with the New York City Police Department. He has been described as "New York City's Blue Bulldog" for being head of one of the largest police unions in the world, having served in this role since 1999 and winning reelection to a fifth term in 2015.

In 2023, Lynch made $109,000 per year as a police officer. If he was promoted to detective or sergeant, he would have had to resign from his union position. He was assigned to the 90th Precinct, which covers the Williamsburg neighborhoods of Brooklyn. Lynch was the subject of one Civilian Complaint Review Board complaint in July 1987 for inappropriate use of force; the Board later declared the complaint "unsubstantiated" due to their being unable to contact the plaintiff.

== Controversies ==
Lynch has a history of conflicting with New York City Hall. In 2007, he stated that the PBA "could never support former New York City Mayor Rudy Giuliani for any elected office." He has also criticized Police Commissioner Ray Kelly, former Mayors Michael Bloomberg and Bill de Blasio, other city trade union leaders, the New York City Council, the Civilian Complaint Review Board, and several national political leaders.

In the wake of 2014 killings of NYPD officers, Lynch turned his back on Mayor Bill de Blasio due to the belief that the political climates set by the mayor and other government officials led to the killing of the two officers. After the autopsy of Eric Garner, who died as a result of a chokehold in July 2014 while being suspected of selling loose cigarettes, he defended the actions of the NYPD officers.

In November 2019, both Lynch and de Blasio criticized Bloomberg's apology for the stop-and-frisk policy which occurred under his administration. Lynch released a statement that said, in part, “The apology is too little, too late”; "Mayor Bloomberg could have saved himself this apology if he had just listened to the police officers on the street”; “We said in the early 2000s that the quota-driven emphasis on street stops was polluting the relationship between cops and our communities”; and “His administration’s misguided policy inspired an anti-police movement that has made cops the target of hatred and violence, and stripped away many of the tools we had used to keep New Yorkers safe.”

On August 18, 2020, Lynch and the PBA endorsed Donald Trump for President in the 2020 United States presidential election, the first time that the union endorsed a presidential candidate, and appeared in the 2020 Republican National Convention.
