= Police Benevolent Association of the City of New York =

Police union for NYPD police officers

NYC PBA
- Police Benevolent Association of the City of New York
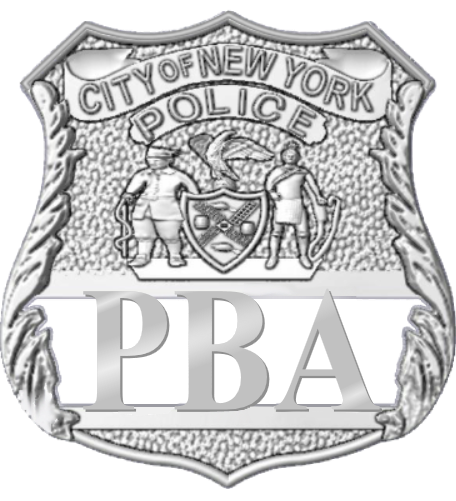
- Founded: 1894
- Headquarters: 125 Broad Street, 11th Floor; New York, NY 10004-2400
- Location: United States
- Members: 23,810 (2017)
- Key people: Patrick Hendry, President
- Affiliations: NAPO
- Website: nycpba.org

The Police Benevolent Association of the City of New York (PBA) is the largest police union representing police officers of the New York City Police Department. It represents about 24,000 of the department's 36,000 officers.

The PBA was originally called the Patrolmen's Benevolent Association. On January 14, 2019, it changed its name to the gender-neutral Police Benevolent Association of the City of New York.

== History ==
As a benevolent or fraternal organization, the New York City's Patrolmen's Benevolent Association was founded in 1894 to help relatives of officers killed in the line of duty. In 1901, it advocated for and received 8-hour workdays. In 1967, New York State passed the Taylor Law, which sets the rules for municipal union organization with regard to representation and bargaining. New York City set up the Office of Collective Bargaining for municipal union demands.

=== Lindsay Administration ===
The PBA was successful in its campaign to defeat Mayor John Lindsay's proposed Civilian Complaint Review Board in 1967.

After a SBA (NYPD Sergeants Benevolent Association) lawsuit which was expected to succeed failed, officers who had been expecting a favorable settlement began a wildcat strike. This unplanned police strike of 1971 was in violation of the Taylor Act which prohibits police from engaging in job actions. The PBA publicly disavowed the strike.

In 1973, New York City began assigning female police officers to work street patrols. The association was opposed to the change, claiming women lacked the physical strength needed to back up male officers.

=== Koch Administration ===
In January 1978, Mayor Ed Koch prohibited city agencies from discrimination on the basis of sexual orientation. Samuel DeMilia, then the president of the association, explained in an article in The New York Times that the order was "unworkable in the police department and can do more harm than good."

=== Dinkins Administration ===
In September 1992, the Patrolmen's Benevolent Association organized a rally of thousands of police officers who blocked the Brooklyn Bridge to protest police oversight proposed by Mayor David Dinkins. Other uniformed officers jumped over police barricades to rush City Hall. Some were openly drinking, damaging cars, and physically attacking journalists from The New York Times on the scene. On-duty officers did little to control the riot.

=== Giuliani Administration ===
The PBA's relations with Mayor Rudy Giuliani (mayoralty, 1994–2001) were marked by years of labor disputes.

In 1997, it led a campaign asking Giuliani not to attend the funerals of city officers killed on duty.

The PBA urged members to resist the mayor's incentive pay initiative in 1998. Additionally, in a five-year contract, officers were subject to a two-year freeze on salaries before seeing salaries increased 13 percent during the last years of the Giuliani tenure.

During November 2007, in anticipation of the 2008 presidential election, PBA president Patrick Lynch criticized the relationship between Giuliani and the NYPD. He said that the union would not endorse Giuliani. He criticized the mayor on pay issues, saying, "The inability to keep veteran cops on the job or to recruit adequate numbers of new ones can be traced directly back to the Giuliani mayoralty." He added, "While the city was rolling in money, the Giuliani administration cried future poverty and stuck New York police officers with three and half years without a pay raise." Lynch further asserted that "Rudy Giuliani has no real credentials as a terrorism fighter."

==== September 11th ====
Many officers perished at the Twin Towers during the September 11, 2001 attacks in Lower Manhattan. In the course of their work shifts, scores more were exposed to toxins—produced by the collapse of the Twin Towers during the rescue and recovery effort after the September 11, 2001 attacks at Ground Zero. Surviving first responders and their advocates are asserting that their illnesses resulted from exposure to toxins at Ground Zero.

The PBA filed a lawsuit to secure benefits for Officer Christopher Hynes (then aged 36). In March 2004, he was diagnosed as having sarcoidosis. Despite the diagnosis, the NYPD refused to grant line-of-duty injury status to him. Hynes had worked for a total of 111 hours at Ground Zero and its vicinity. He has claimed that he was never given a proper respirator for his work at Ground Zero. He has had difficulty in paying medical bills because of the denial of line-of-duty status. The PBA noted that firefighters, by contrast, have been given line-of-duty status for illnesses traced back to working at Ground Zero.

=== De Blasio Administration ===
Following NYC Mayor Bill de Blasio's election in 2013, running largely on a political campaign advocating for reform in publicly unpopular NYPD policies, including "Stop and Frisk", the PBA began actively organizing against de Blasio, accusing him of failing to support the NYPD, as these policies were heavily promoted by previous mayoral administrations to prevent violent crime. Prior to these policies being instated, the city was suffering from a crime epidemic which promoted the aggressive "Stop and Frisk" policy under the Bloomberg administration. This was a shift from a mildly successful movement towards community policing under the Giuliani administration. The PBA felt that their officers were being wrongly blamed for the failed change of policies by politicians, rather than being supported in transitioning to a new form of policing by the de Blasio administration.

Following the killing of two NYPD officers in Brooklyn on December 20, 2014, in an execution-style shooting, the PBA's opposition to de Blasio reached an all-time high, with PBA President Patrick Lynch accusing Mayor de Blasio of having blood on his hands, and of encouraging violence against police and acting like the leader of a "f-ing revolution." Further, the PBA asked members to sign letters ordering the Mayor not to attend their funerals, should they perish in the line of duty. They felt that if the Mayor were to attend their funerals it would be out of political motivation rather than a sincere appreciation of their sacrifice to protect the citizens of New York City. Lynch urged the police to stick close to the rules to protect themselves.

Lynch's comments were much criticized by supporters of Mayor de Blasio. Many feared Lynch's comments would further inflame the more radical elements of his opposition, serve to incite further acts of violence against the NYPD, and lead to further police abuses carried out as a result of the "wartime" posture.

On January 31, 2017, the city and the union reached an agreement on a new contract. If ratified by the union members, the contract called for an 11% pay increase for police officers on the force and cuts to officers hired in the future.

In March 2020 NYC Health Commissioner Oxiris Barbot denied a New York Police Department (NYPD) request for 500,000 additional surgical masks in priority over other departments. She told NYPD Chief of Department Terence Monahan during the heated dispute that "I don't give two rats' asses about your cops." The Police Benevolent Association of the City of New York called for her firing. Barbot later apologized.

==== Eric Garner's death ====
PBA president Patrick Lynch blamed the killing of Eric Garner by policeman Daniel Pantaleo on Garner's resistance to arrest. New York Police Department Administrative Judge Rosemarie Maldonado would eventually find that video evidence and autopsy results provided "'overwhelming'" evidence that Pantaleo had placed Garner in a chokehold. In her recommendation to the Commissioner, Judge Maldonado found that Pantaleo's "'use of a chokehold fell so far short of objective reasonableness that this tribunal found it to be reckless—a gross deviation from the standard of conduct established for a New York City police officer.'"

==== Shake Shack incident ====
In June 2020, three policemen from the Bronx were on duty because of civil unrest in Manhattan. They ordered milkshakes from a nearby Shake Shack using a phone app. They picked up their order, but became suspicious of how the milkshakes tasted. The manager apologized and gave them coupons for free food. The police officers left and later reported the incident. This led to an investigation that determined there was no foul play.

The Police Benevolent Association president Patrick Lynch stated that the police officers had come "under attack" from a "toxic substance, believed to be bleach." The association later retracted their comments and deleted their online posts.

==== Endorsement of Donald Trump ====
On August 18, 2020, Lynch and the PBA endorsed Donald Trump for President in the 2020 United States presidential election. Lynch appeared at the Republican National Convention to praise Trump. Lynch had not conferred with the PBA before endorsing Trump on the union's behalf.

=== Adams Administration ===
After the COVID-19 vaccine mandate for city employees, was repealed following the pandemic's retreat, the PBA called for officers that were dismissed for noncompliance to be rehired and given back pay. In April 2024, the PBA launched a lawsuit against the Adams administration for implementing a policy banning the use of steroids and other performance-enhancing drugs by NYPD officers.

=== Mamdani administration ===
In November 2026, in a joint statement with NYPD commissioner Jessica Tisch, mayor Zohran Mamdani announced the decision to disband the police department’s Strategic Response Group (SRG), which was founded in 2015 ostensibly to focus on counter-terrorism, in keeping with his campaign's pledge. The statement added that the department's overhaul would transform how the city prepares for and responds to protests, placing communication, de-escalation and civilian coordination at the center of its approach, "while protecting New Yorkers’ constitutional right to protest." The Association criticized the move, arguing it would "endanger the safety of officers and the public."

== PBA cards ==
The PBA issues cards to its officers that read "The bearer of this card is a supporter of the PBA, and you should try to extend every courtesy possible." Prior to 2018, officers were allowed to receive a maximum of thirty cards and retired officers a maximum of twenty; this has since been reduced to twenty and ten, respectively. Sometimes referred to as "get out of jail free cards" or "courtesy cards", they are officially given out as a "public relations tool" which do not provide immunity from arrest, however citizens have claimed to use the cards to avoid punishment for offenses, and an officer was demoted for ticketing a card holder. Other New York City police unions also issue cards, including the Detectives Endowment Association and the Sergeants Benevolent Association.

== See also ==
- Detectives' Endowment Association
- Health effects arising from the September 11, 2001 attacks
- Sergeants Benevolent Association
