= Sergeants Benevolent Association =

American police union in NYC for NYPD sergeants

- Founded: 1899
- Headquarters: 35 Worth Street, New York, NY 10013
- Location: United States
- Members: 11,000

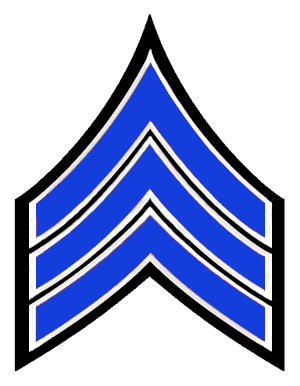
NYPD Sergeant Stripes

The Sergeants Benevolent Association (SBA) is an American police union that represents the sergeants of the New York City Police Department (NYPD), while the department's nonsupervisory patrol officers are represented by the larger Police Benevolent Association. The SBA is characterized by the Associated Press as a partisan organization, and is known for perpetually criticizing the mayor of New York City (especially recent mayor Bill de Blasio), unfavored police commissioners, and other politicians through an inflammatory Twitter account, press releases and other media statements. The organization has engaged in doxxing and leaked intimate personal details from internal police reports.

== History ==
=== Early years ===
Richard E. Enright, first President of the SBA, circa 1915

In 1899, following the consolidation of the five New York City borough police departments, a fraternal organization known as the Police Sergeants Endowment and Benevolent Association was founded in New York City. In 1907 Sergeant Richard E. Enright was elected the first SBA President.

Harold Melnick became the SBA's President in 1961, and over his 20-year term in office, the SBA won individual collective bargaining rights, established a self-administered health and welfare plan, and expanded health insurance coverage for NYC sergeants. In 1995, the SBA merged with the unions representing sergeants of the New York City Transit Police and New York City Housing Authority Police Department, as those departments merged into the NYPD.

=== 21st century ===
On July 1, 2002, Ed Mullins was elected President of the Sergeants Benevolent Association, and later reelected for several four-year terms. He was also chairman and trustee to the union's Health Benefits Fund and Annuity Fund and a trustee for the New York City Police Pension Fund.

Under Mullins, the SBA fought fiercely against police reform and took a much more hard-line conservative position, making up for its small size with aggressive messaging and extreme rhetoric. The SBA has made extensive use of both social media and traditional media; Mullins was a regular on the conservative talk-show circuit.

In 2003, Mullins argued that police officers should be able to sue the estates of people they kill in shootings for emotional damages. The SBA fought against mandatory breathalyzer tests for officers who fire their weapons on the job. In 2006, Mullins and the SBA demanded an apology from mayor Michael Bloomberg for saying that he was "deeply disturbed" by the officer-involved shooting death of Sean Bell.

In 2015, Mullins wrote a letter of protest to Google, complaining about a feature in the Waze traffic app that allows users to pinpoint the locations of police officers. He said that allowing users to "get alerts before they approach police" could put police officers at risk from criminals who will abuse the real-time data provided by Waze.

In May 2016, Mullins called for police commissioner Bill Bratton to step down amid a police corruption investigation. In August 2018, the SBA began offering civilians $500 cash rewards for coming to the aid of an officer in trouble and helping police officers restrain those resisting arrest.

In 2019, Mullins emailed an explicitly racist video to the Association's membership, referring to black people as "monsters", along with the message: "Pay close attention to every word. You will hear what goes through the mind of real policemen every single day on the job. This is the best video I've ever seen telling the public the absolute truth." After the email was publicized, he said that sharing the video was an honest mistake, apologized to union members, and told the New York Post that "there is no one to blame but me for the video that was distributed." The SBA declined to discipline or criticize Mullins.

In February 2020, the SBA tweeted "Mayor De Blasio, the members of the NYPD are declaring war on you! We do not respect you, DO NOT visit us in hospitals. You sold the NYPD to the vile creatures, the 1% who hate cops but vote for you. NYPD cops have been assassinated because of you. This isn't over, Game on!" after a targeted attack on police officers, which the mayor had referred to as an assassination attempt.

In May 2020, during the George Floyd protests in New York City, the SBA doxxed de Blasio's daughter by tweeting a photo of her arrest record shortly after she was arrested for blocking traffic during a protest and refusing to move after officials deemed it an "unlawful assembly", as reported by The New York Post and Fox News. The arrest record contained her home address, date of birth, and state ID number, among other information, and was later taken down.

In July 2020, during an interview with Fox News, Mullins appeared with a QAnon mug in the background. In a phone call with Business Insider, he refused to clarify whether it was his or whether he endorsed the QAnon conspiracy theories. This was not the first time the mug, which featured the word QANON and the hashtag WWG1WGA, had appeared at Mullin's side in an interview.

In September 2020, Mullins supported attorney general William Barr's description of New York as an "anarchist city." Mullins said, "Barr is correct we are living in criminal anarchy." In February 2021, the SBA Twitter account repeated the claim that the Sergeants Benevolent Association was "at war" with the government of New York City. Mullins was charged with misconduct by the Civilian Complaint Review Board in February 2021, and he faced the loss of months of salary. The board substantiated three charges against him: two of offensive language and one of abuse of authority (against de Blasio's daughter).

On October 5, 2021, Mullins resigned at the request of the SBA executive board after the FBI raided his office and home. In February 2022, Mullins pled not guilty to a criminal charge of wire fraud for improper SBA expenses amounting to hundreds of thousands of dollars. The SBA sued him in March, and in January 2023, Mullins pled guilty to the wire fraud charge and agreed to forfeit $600,000 to the government and make restitution of $600,000 to the SBA; federal guidelines for sentencing suggested 33–41 months in prison, with a maximum of 20 years. On August 3, 2023, Mullins was sentenced to two years in prison and three years of supervised release.

== Facilities ==
The Sergeants Benevolent Association built a television studio inside its Lower Manhattan headquarters, where Mullins intended to direct and star in podcasts and videos to, in his words, "take it nationwide, you know you can give law enforcement a voice."
