= United EMS Workers – AFSCME Local 4911 =

American labor union

United EMS Workers
- Founded: 2011
- Headquarters: California 175 Bernal Rd, Suite 205 F San Jose, CA 95119
- Location: United States
- Members: 4,000 (2017)
- Key people: Craig Dailey, President; Jocelyn Paulson, Vice President; Rebecca Mackowiak, Secretary; Adam Galotti, Treasurer
- Affiliations: AFSCME (AFL–CIO)
- Website: www.uemsw.org

United EMS Workers-AFSCME Local 4911 is a labor union representing emergency medical services (EMS) workers. Members include emergency medical technicians, paramedics, registered nurses, vehicle service technicians, emergency medical dispatchers, and 911 schedulers.

== History ==
United EMS Workers-AFSCME Local 4911 was chartered in September 2011 under AFSCME (American Federation of State, County, and Municipal Employees) in order to represent EMS workers who are employed by private ambulance providers in the United States. United EMS Workers-AFSCME Local 4911 was founded through a partnership between a group of EMS workers from Northern California and New England and AFSCME's executive leadership body. United EMS Workers-AFSCME Local 4911 is a registered labor union with the Office of Labor-Management Standards under the United States Department of Labor, and files mandatory reporting paperwork as an independent local union of AFSCME.

Unlike most AFSCME Locals, United EMS Workers-AFSCME Local 4911 is not affiliated with an AFSCME district council. Due to its relationship with AFSCME, United EMS Workers-AFSCME Local 4911 is affiliated with the AFL–CIO; and is also a member of the EMS Labor Alliance, the Kaiser Coalition, and a number of local area labor councils.

== Governance and leadership ==
United EMS Workers is governed by an Executive Board composed of President, Vice-President, Treasurer, Secretary, Directors, and Trustees. United EMS Workers-AFSCME Local 4911 bargaining unit members are represented in each bargaining unit by democratically elected shop stewards and members of local committees as defined and elected by members of each bargaining unit. United EMS Workers-AFSCME Local 4911's operations are governed by its bylaws and by the AFSCME International Constitution.

== Politics ==
United EMS Workers-AFSCME Local 4911 is involved in local, state, and national politics. It is a post-submission date signatory to the EMSLA (EMS Labor Alliance) White Paper in support of the creation of a federal lead agency for EMS under the United States Department of Homeland Security. United EMS Workers-AFSCME Local 4911 members participate in national and state campaigns on behalf of AFSCME (endorsing or opposing candidates and/or legislation that affect workers’ rights and the working conditions of EMS workers). Members also participate in local, municipal, and county political processes, and work with local labor councils on issues of importance to the membership. These political relationships have been vital in securing incumbent workforce language for hundreds of EMS workers in multiple ambulance RFPs.
