= International Association of EMTs and Paramedics =

International Association of EMTs and Paramedics - IAEP
- Founded: 1991
- Headquarters: Quincy, MA - Headquarters
- Location: United States
- Key people: David J. Holway, President; Phillip Petit, Division Director
- Affiliations: NAGE, SEIU, CTW

IAEP is a labor union, a division of NAGE / SEIU Local 5000 (National Association of Government Employees) that represents EMS professionals (EMTs, Paramedics,) working for public, "third service", and private ambulance (Emergency Medical Services, EMT, Paramedic, Dispatcher, Registered Nurses, Support Staff) in self-autonomous union locals. IAEP locals elect their own local governing executive boards and officers and are provided representational, legal, contract, and political support by NAGE but govern and manage their own affairs.

== History ==
The IAEP was formed in 1991 by NAGE when it was observed that a large number of EMTs and Paramedics working for public, private, and third service entities seeking union representation. The creation of IAEP was the first time that parent union NAGE began to represent privately employed workers.

IAEP claims that it experienced rapid growth since its founding and has set standards for EMS in the labor industry through contracts and representation.

== Politics ==
IAEP locals set their own political positions and advocate for their own political positions. Because IAEP is a division of NAGE / SEIU Local 5000, IAEP locals gain access to the political resources of NAGE. Because NAGE is affiliated with SEIU, NAGE gains access to the political resources of SEIU. IAEP locals rely on these resources to help advance their own political agendas and issues. IAEP locals also participate in COPE (Committee On Political Education). COPE is a voluntary political action fund that supports IAEP political and legislative activities. COPE contributions are used to support grassroots lobbying efforts and help elect local, state and federal candidates who support the collective bargaining agreements, issues and concerns of IAEP members.

IAEP, on behalf of IAEP locals is on the congressional record in California as being opposed to California Senate Bill 556, a bill that would require EMS professionals working for a private ambulance company performing public safety services (911 emergency services) under a public contract to wear specific labels. IAEP requested California Governor Brown veto the bill

== Critics ==
Some critics of IAEP claim that IAEP has been rebranded as NAGE EMS. NAGE claims that "NAGE has two EMS divisions. The IAEP represents public, third-service, and private EMS across the U.S. NAGE EMS is focused specifically on private EMS."

Some Northern California EMS workers working for American Medical Response are critical of SEIU Local 250 for signing a servicing contract with IAEP in 2004 during that workforce's long drawn out decertification battle of SEIU Local 250.

In Clark County Nevada, SEIU Local 1107 in 2008 called on IAEP to assist in representing EMS workers considering decertification. American Medical Response(AMR) refused to recognize IAEP as representative of employees, claiming only SEIU 1107 was the legal representative, and IAEP after consultation with the NLRB relinquished its claim of representation and withdrew assisting SEIU Local 1107.

The Nevada Policy Research Institute, a free market think tank, claims that "IAEP chapters have used aggressive tactics in several labor negotiations with AMR (American Medical Response) that have resulted in massive salary increases."

== See also ==
- NAGE EMS
