= Executive Order 10988 =

1962 US executive order granting federal workers the right to collectively bargain

Executive Order 10988 is a United States presidential executive order issued by President John F. Kennedy on January 17, 1962 that granted federal employees the right to collective bargaining. This executive order was a breakthrough for public sector workers, who were not protected under the 1935 Wagner Act.

Passage of the executive order forestalled the legislative Rhodes-Johnson Union Recognition bill, which would have given more power to federal employee unions, possibly creating a union shop arrangement.

Executive Order 10988 was effectively replaced by President Richard Nixon's Executive Order 11491 in 1969.

== Contents ==
Workers gained the right to join unions and other organizations of workers; however they were not permitted to strike—federal strikes had been explicitly prohibited in 1947 by the Taft-Hartley Act—or to join the leadership of these groups. Until 1978, federal workers had to take unpaid time off to participate in collective bargaining themselves.

The order in some ways went further than the Wagner Act, instructing agencies to develop informal relationships with employee organizations (so long as they are not corrupt or undemocratic) and not to campaign against them. In fact, the order asks agencies to seek their input with "affirmative willingness".

However, the order does not require "good faith negotiations", as the Wagner Act does. And because federal workers are not allowed to strike, labor disputes can only legally reach the point of an "impasse". An impasse can be resolved by appeals to mediators, fact-finders, or a higher authority—or it can be ignored by management, and the status quo allowed to continue.

The order explicitly does not apply to intelligence agencies. It also gives agency heads the right to suspend its rules for operations outside of the United States.

== Effect ==
Union membership among federal employees increased several times over in the next decade. This effect boosted even longstanding federal unions, such as the National Federation of Federal Employees.

This expansion led President Lyndon B. Johnson to form the Presidential Review Committee on Employee-Management Relations in the Federal Service.

=== Military ===
There had been some history of unionizing in the military before 1961, and when the order was passed around 10% of service members were part of outside organizations. By 1968 these figures had risen: 39% of the Army, 44% of the Air Force, and 53% of the Navy belonged to employee organizations.

The order yielded many collective bargaining agreements, which have generally provided for arbitration in labor grievances.

=== Public sector ===
Labor historians believe that Executive Order 10988 served as a model for public sector unionism, even for local, municipal and state employees. Membership in AFSCME increased substantially during the 1960s and 1970s, and 22 states legalized collective bargaining for public sector workers. Public sector strikes also increased many times over.

In June 2018, the Supreme Court decision in the case of Janus v. AFSCME found that application of public sector union fees to government employees who are not union members represents compelled speech, and as such is a violation of First Amendment rights. This decision by the Supreme Court potentially reduces funding for Unions that represent Federal Government employees. Some have proposed repeal of Executive Order 10988, which could potentially occur if the President were to issue an executive order vacating Executive Order 10988.
