= Welfare of broiler chickens =

Form of animal welfare

The breeding and raising of broiler chickens has created health and animal welfare issues, such as cardiovascular and skeletal dysfunction.

== Meat birds ==
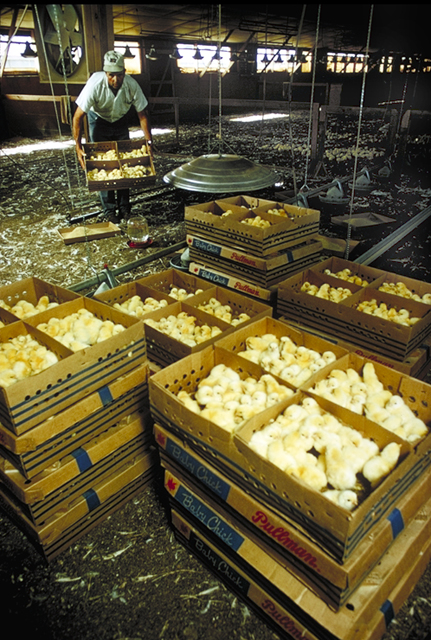
One-day-old chicks arriving to be unpacked and placed in shed

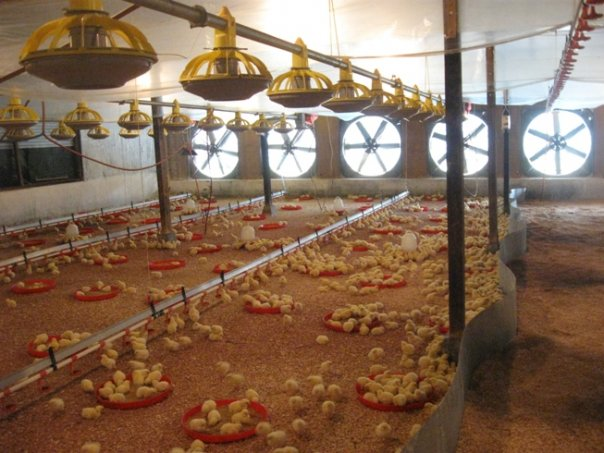
Young birds being reared in a closed broiler house

Artificial selection has led to a great increase in the speed with which broilers develop and reach slaughter-weight. The time required to reach 1.5 kg (3 lb 5 oz) live-weight decreased from 120 days to 30 days between 1925 and 2005. Selection for fast early growth-rate, and feeding and management procedures to support such growth, have led to various welfare problems in modern broiler strains. Welfare of broilers is of particular concern given the large number of individuals that are produced; for example, the U.S. in 2011 produced approximately 9 billion broiler chickens.

=== Cardiovascular dysfunction ===
Selection and husbandry for very fast growth means there is a genetically induced mismatch between the energy-supplying organs of the broiler and its energy-consuming organs. Rapid growth can lead to metabolic disorders such as sudden death syndrome (SDS) and ascites.

SDS is an acute heart failure disease that affects mainly male fast-growing broilers which appear to be in good condition. Affected birds suddenly start to flap their wings, lose their balance, sometimes cry out and then fall on their backs or sides and die, usually all within a minute. In 1993, U.K. broiler producers reported an incidence of 0.8%. In 2000, SDS has a death rate of 0.1–3% in Europe.

Ascites is characterised by hypertrophy and dilatation of the heart, changes in liver function, pulmonary insufficiency, hypoxaemia and accumulation of large amounts of fluid in the abdominal cavity. Ascites develops gradually and the birds suffer for an extended period before they die. In the UK, up to 19 million broilers die in their sheds from heart failure each year.

=== Skeletal dysfunction ===
Breeding for increased breast muscle means that the broilers' centre of gravity has moved forward and their breasts are broader compared with their ancestors, which affects the way they walk and puts additional stresses on their hips and legs. There is a high frequency of skeletal problems in broilers, mainly in the locomotory system, including varus and valgus deformities, osteodystrophy, dyschondroplasia and femoral head necrosis. These leg abnormalities impair the locomotor abilities of the birds, and lame birds spend more time lying and sleeping. The behavioural activities of broilers decrease rapidly from 14 days of age onwards. Reduced locomotion also decreases ossification of the bones and results in skeletal abnormalities; these are reduced when broilers have been exercised under experimental conditions.

Most broilers find walking painful, as indicated by studies using analgesic and anti-inflammatory drugs. In one experiment, healthy birds took 11 seconds to negotiate an obstacle course, whereas lame birds took 34 seconds. After the birds had been treated with carprofen, there was no effect on the speed of the healthy birds, however, the lame birds now took only 18 seconds to negotiate the course, indicating that the pain of lameness is relieved by the drug. In self-selection experiments, lame birds select more drugged feed than non-lame birds leading to the suggestion that leg problems in broilers are painful.

Several research groups have developed "gait scores" (GS) to objectively rank the walking ability and lameness of broilers. In one example of these scales, GS=0 indicates normal walking ability, GS=3 indicates an obvious gait abnormality which affects the bird's ability to move about and GS=5 indicates a bird that cannot walk at all. GS=5 birds tried to use their wings to help them walking, or crawled along on their shanks. In one study, almost 26% of the birds examined were rated as GS=3 or above and can therefore be considered to have suffered from painful lameness.

Compassion in World Farming wrote on the incidence of leg problems in broilers:

...there is evidence that, far from improving, leg problems may have deteriorated further during the 1990s. Large and representative surveys of commercial broiler flocks in Denmark (1999) and Sweden (2002) found that in Denmark, 75% of the chickens had some walking abnormality and 30.1% were very lame (gait score greater than 2). In Sweden, over 72% of the chickens had some walking abnormality and around 20% were very lame. 36.9% of the chickens surveyed in Denmark and around half (46.4% and 52.6%, depending on strain) of the chickens surveyed in Sweden had leg deformities (varus/valgus). 57% of the chickens surveyed in Denmark and around half of the chickens surveyed in Sweden showed some evidence of tibial dychondroplasia (Sanotra, Berg and Lund, 2003).

The video recordings below are examples of broilers attempting to walk with increasing levels of gait abnormalities and therefore increasing gait scores.

Gait score = 0

Gait score = 1
Gait score = 2

Gait score = 3
Gait score = 4

Gait score = 5

=== Integument lesions ===
Sitting and lying behaviours in fast growing strains increase with age from 75% in the first seven days to 90% at 35 days of age. This increased inactivity is linked with an increase in dermatitis caused by a greater amount of time in contact with ammonia in the litter. This contact dermatitis is characterised by hyperkeratosis and necrosis of the epidermis at the affected sites; it can take forms such as hock burns, breast blisters and foot pad lesions.

=== Stocking density ===
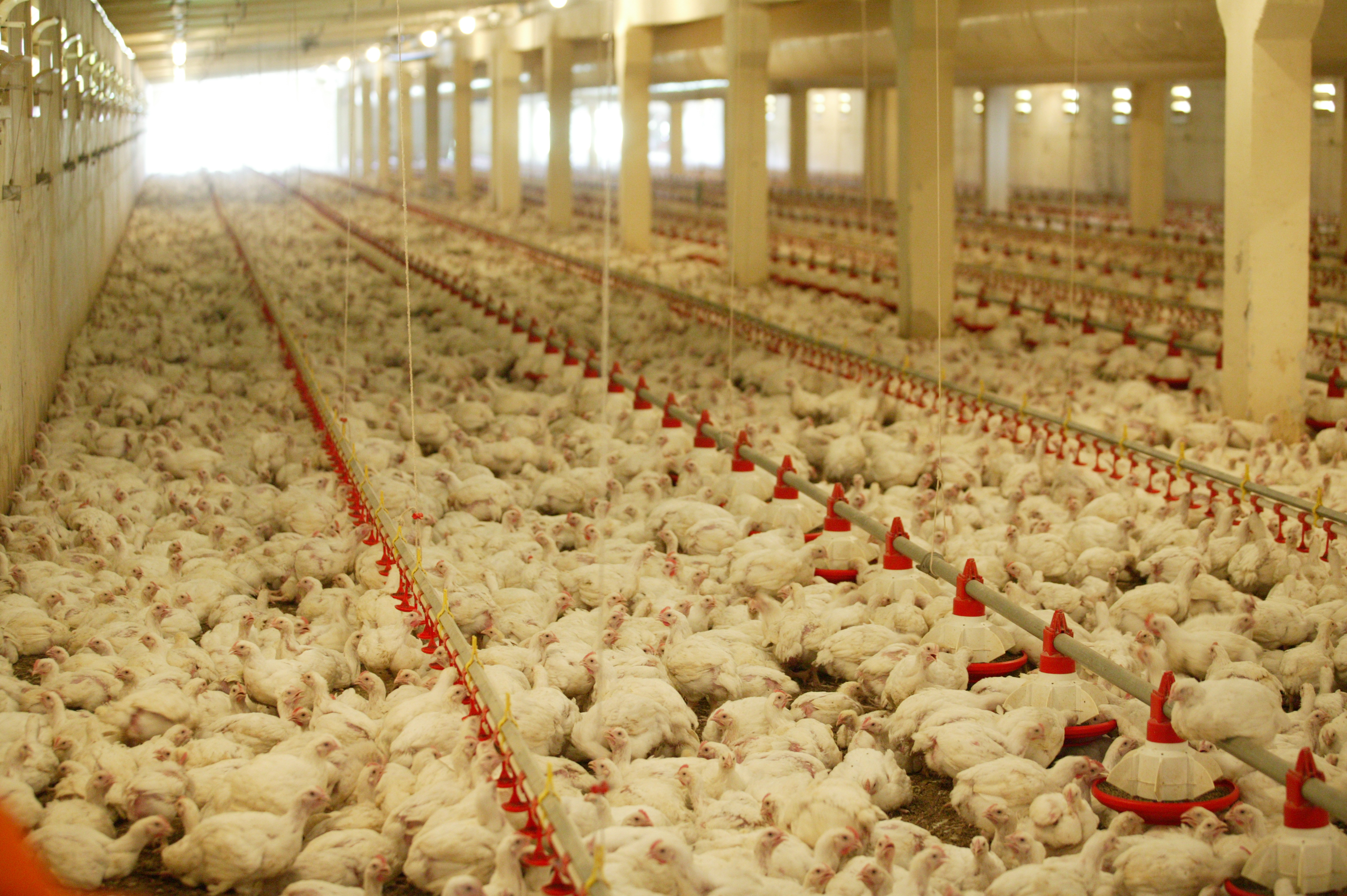
Broilers in a rearing shed indicating the high stocking densities used

Broilers are usually kept at high stocking densities which vary considerably between countries. Typical stocking densities in Europe range between about 22–42 kg/m^{2} (5–9 lb/sq ft) or between about 11 to 25 birds per square metre (1.0 to 2.3/sq ft). There is a reduction of feed intake and reduced growth rate when stocking density exceeds approximately 30 kg/m^{2} (6 lb/sq ft) under deep litter conditions. The reduced growth rate is likely due to a reduced capacity to lose heat generated by metabolism. Higher stocking densities are associated with increased dermatitis including foot pad lesions, breast blisters and soiled plumage. In a large-scale experiment with commercial farms, it was shown that the management conditions (litter quality, temperature and humidity) were more important than stocking density.

=== Ocular dysfunction ===
In attempts to improve or maintain fast growth, broilers are kept under a range of lighting conditions. These include continuous light (fluorescent and incandescent), continuous darkness, or under dim light; chickens kept under these light conditions develop eye abnormalities such as macrophthalmos, avian glaucoma, ocular enlargement and shallow anterior chambers.

=== Ammonia ===
The litter in broiler pens can become highly polluted from the nitrogenous feces of the birds and produce ammonia. Ammonia has been shown to cause increased susceptibility to disease and other health-related problems such as Newcastle disease, airsaculitis and keratoconjunctivitis. The respiratory epithelium in birds is damaged by ammonia concentrations in the air exceeding 75 parts per million (ppm). Ammonia concentrations at 25 to 50 ppm induce eye lesions in broiler chicks after seven days of exposure.

=== Catching and transport ===
Once the broilers have reached the target live-weight, they are caught, usually by hand, and packed live into crates for transport to the slaughterhouse. They are usually deprived of food and water for several hours before catching until slaughter. The process of catching, loading, transport and unloading causes serious stress, injury and even death to a large number of broilers.

The number of broilers that died in the EU in 2005 during the process of catching, packing and transport was estimated to be as high as 18 to 35 million. In the UK, of broilers that were found to be 'dead on arrival' at the slaughterhouse in 2005, it was estimated that up to 40% may have died from thermal stress or suffocation due to crowding on the transporter.

Slaughter is done by hanging the birds, fully conscious, by their feet upside-down in shackles on a moving chain, stunning them by automatically immersing them in an electrified water bath and exsanguination by cutting their throats.

Some research indicates that chickens might be more intelligent than previously supposed, which "raises questions about how they are treated". A possible 10 year life span has been shortened to six weeks for broilers.

=== Mortality rates ===
According to historical records, broiler mortality rates in the U.S. have decreased from 18% in 1925 to 3.7% in 2012, but have increased since 2013 to reach 5% in 2018.

One indication of the effect of broilers' rapid growth rate on welfare is a comparison of the usual mortality rate for standard broiler chickens (1% per week) with that for slower-growing broiler chickens (0.25% per week) and with young laying hens (0.14% per week); the mortality rate of the fast-growing broilers is seven times the rate of laying hens (the same subspecies) of the same age.

== Parent birds ==
Meat broilers are usually slaughtered at approximately 35 to 49 days of age, well before they become sexually reproductive at 5 to 6 months of age. However, the bird's parents, often called "broiler-breeders", must live to maturity and beyond so they can be used for breeding. As a consequence, they have additional welfare concerns.

Meat broilers have been artificially selected for an extremely high feeding motivation, but are not usually feed-restricted, as this would delay the time taken for them to reach slaughter-weight. Broiler-breeders have the same highly increased feeding motivation, but must be feed-restricted to prevent them becoming overweight with all its concomitant life-threatening problems. An experiment on broilers' food intake found that 20% of birds allowed to eat as much as they wanted either died or had to be killed because of severe illness between 11 and 20 weeks of age – either they became so lame they could not stand, or they developed cardiovascular problems.

Broiler breeders fed on commercial rations eat only a quarter to a half as much as they would with free access to food. They are highly motivated to eat at all times, presumably leading to chronic frustration of feeding.

Because broiler breeders live to adulthood, they might show feather pecking or other injurious pecking behaviour. To avoid this, they might be beak trimmed which can lead to acute or chronic pain.
