= New York City Civilian Complaint Review Board =

New York City civilian agency overseeing the NYPD

Civilian Complaint Review Board

Board overview
- Jurisdiction: New York City
- Headquarters: 100 Church Street, Manhattan, NY 10017
- Board executives: Arva Rice, Interim Chair; Jonathan Darche, executive director
- Key document: New York City Charter
- Website: nyc.gov/ccrb

The NYC Civilian Complaint Review Board (CCRB) is a civilian oversight agency with jurisdiction over the New York City Police Department (NYPD), the largest police force in the United States. A board of the Government of New York City, the CCRB is tasked with investigating, mediating and prosecuting complaints of misconduct on the part of the NYPD.

== Structure ==
The agency's regulations are compiled in Title 38-A of the New York City Rules.

The CCRB exists today as a fully independent civil department, staffed with 142 civilian investigators and about a dozen miscellaneous employees. Additionally, three officers from the NYPD's Monitoring and Analysis Section of the Department Advocate's Office work with the CCRB at their office at 100 Church Street, whose role is to provide the Investigators with access to certain restricted NYPD documentation.

The agency is headed by the 15 member board, 5 appointed by the city council, 5 by the mayor, 1 by the public advocate, 3 designated by the Police Commissioner, and finally, the Chair, jointly appointed by the speaker and the mayor; none may be current public employees. Rev. Frederick Davie served as Chair until January 2022, at which point Arva Rice was appointed Interim Chair. Arva Rice resigned her position as Interim Chair in July 2024. Jonathan Darche, after having served as Interim Executive Director and Chief Prosecutor, was appointed Executive Director in May 2017.

The agency is divided into several divisions, the largest being the Investigations Division. The Investigations Division is headed by two chiefs of investigations who oversee 16 investigative squads.

The agency also contains an Administrative Division, which includes Human Resources, Information Management Unit and the Case Management Unit (which stores all records of past cases), among others, which is led by the deputy executive director of administration. There are then four other directorships, including the new "Research and Strategic Initiatives Director", as well as the Mediation Unit Director. There is also legal counsel. These units complement and serve the Investigations Unit, which acts as the main focal point of the Agency.

== Handling complaints ==
=== Investigation ===
==== Jurisdiction ====
Each complaint the agency receives is assessed by one of the investigative managers on a daily rotating basis and has its merits checked for proper jurisdiction. Jurisdiction is first assessed by type of allegations. Only allegations that fall under the jurisdiction of the CCRB are investigated by the CCRB. They include Force (whether use of force was justified), Abuse of Authority (which includes unauthorized searches and seizures, inappropriate entry onto property, refusal to provide name and shield number, etc.), Discourtesy (using foul language, acting in a rude and unprofessional manner, flashing rude and offensive gestures, etc.) and Offensive Language, which is more specific than Discourtesy, and includes slurs based on race, religion, ethnicity, sex, gender, and LGBTQ status. Jurisdiction is also determined by the officers involved. As many types of officers work in the City of New York (such as the MTA Police, the Port Authority Police and the New York State Police), complainants encounter all of these officers in their day-to-day lives. Only incidents involving members of the NYPD are investigated by the CCRB. Cases that do not fall within the CCRB's jurisdiction are then forwarded to the respective jurisdiction (usually, the NYPD Internal Affairs Bureau, the Office of the Chief of Department or the respective organization in question, such as another police department).

==== Civilian contact ====
The cases are then assigned to one of 142 civilian investigators, who are members of one of 16 squads, who then attempts to contact the civilian who initially complained. After initial assignment, there are four dispositions that result only from a full investigation: Substantiated, Unsubstantiated, Exonerated, and Unfounded. There are five other "miscellaneous", or inconclusive dispositions: Complainant Uncooperative, Complainant Unavailable, Officer Unidentified, Miscellaneous (i.e. the MOS has retired since the incident occurred) and Mediated. If contact with the civilian complainant is not achieved after five contact attempts by telephone and two letters by mail, and the contact information is confirmed the case is automatically closed with a disposition of, "Complainant Uncooperative". If the civilian cannot be located after a diligent search and/or did not provide accurate or correct contact information, the case is closed as "Complainant Unavailable". These types of cases are not considered "full investigations", but are tallied together with the total number of complaints for statistical purposes.

If the civilian is contacted, a statement is initially taken over the phone by the investigator to further ensure proper jurisdiction and to gain a basic understanding of the broad facts within the complaint. An in-person interview is then scheduled at the CCRB's office at 100 Church Street, at which point, the investigator meets with the civilian and any witnesses they bring with them that were present at the time of the incident and interviews each person separately. The investigator then transcribes the interview, submits a "case plan" to one of their three supervisors (each team having an Assistant Supervising Investigator, a Supervising Investigator and an Investigative Manager).

==== Officer contact ====
Once the case plan is approved, the investigator must then begin their investigation, which involves identifying all subject and witness officers involved. If the investigator fails to identify the officers, the case is closed as "Officers Unidentified". Once the officers are identified, which is done by obtaining a variety of NYPD documents, including SPRINTS/911 tapes to identify which officer(s) responded to the call in question, roll calls from specific commands, to see which officers were working in the area of question during the time of the incident, Command Logs from respective commands, to determine if the incident was logged and which officer logged it, Memo Books of Officers or DD5s of Detectives, to search for possible notes about the incident, along with arrest records, court records, photographs, Complaint Reports, Accident Reports, AIDED reports, Stop, Question and Possibly Frisk Reports (UF-250s), to name only a few.

Once the officer is identified, the officer is then scheduled to give a statement to the investigator and must attend, according to Patrol Guide 211.13. An officer failing to appear or lying to an investigator is, in itself, a violation that could result in severe discipline up to and including suspension and possibly termination. Each officer and their partner at the time, along with any witness officers are interviewed and questioned about the incident by the investigator. This interview is also taped and transcribed, and based upon the officer's testimony, further information is obtained by the investigator, including subpoenaed medical records, further department documentation, field canvasses and their resulting information, and so on.

=== Mediation ===
Mediation is an option for certain complaints provided the officer does not have an extensive CCRB or NYPD disciplinary history, there was no arrest made and severe force or abuse of authority were not involved. In mediation, the officer and civilian both voluntarily bypass the investigative process and meet each other one-on-one with a third-party mediator to discuss the incident. This results in no disciplinary action being taken against the officer and often results in a more satisfied civilian as an outcome.

=== Recommendation ===
After all the civilians and members of service are interviewed and all possible relevant documentation has been received and analyzed, the investigator then collects any relevant case law and begins their "recommendation", which is their report, averaging about 10-12 pages, on the case in question. The report is broken down into relatively strict (each team has their own "style", dictated by the Team Managers and Supervisors, and even then, can and often does vary between internal team supervision), template of investigative analysis. The report includes a summary of all complaints made, an explanation of the circumstances of the case, a summation of the statements by the officers and civilians, a credibility assessment of the officers and the civilians (at which point, the investigator is supposed to weigh in criminal history of civilians and CCRB history of officers, as well as inconsistencies between accounts, motivation of the civilian and the overall possibility of an incident occurring), a summation of criminal and CCRB history of the civilians and officers respectively and finally a recommendation for disposition on each complaint.

A recommendation for disposition on each complaint breaks down into four main categories (beyond the technical variants mentioned in part earlier): Substantiated, meaning the officer committed the act in question and it consisted of misconduct; Unsubstantiated, meaning that there is not a preponderance of evidence, either way, to determine if the incident occurred as described and/or the incident consisted of misconduct; Exonerated meaning that the incident occurred but did not consist of misconduct, either because the officers actions were justified or did not actually consist of misconduct; Unfounded meaning that the incident did not occur as described and no misconduct occurred.

=== Board action ===
The recommendations are then reviewed by at least two team level supervisors who then approve or instruct the investigator to "correct" their findings, and upon approval submit the case to the Board. Once the Board receives the complaint, either as a full board, or, more likely, as a three-member sub-unit, they meet to discuss the case and then vote on the recommendations of the investigator.

Public meetings are held to communicate recent statistics and "snapshots", of some of the more straightforward cases are published as examples for the public's understanding and announced at the meeting.

=== Prosecution ===
Historically, when the board substantiated a complaint and found that an officer committed misconduct, it forwarded the case to the New York City Police Department (NYPD), in most cases with a disciplinary recommendation. While the CCRB has the authority to investigate complaints and to determine if misconduct occurred, under the law only the police commissioner has the authority to impose discipline and decide the appropriate penalty.

However, on April 2, 2012, the NYPD and the CCRB signed a Memorandum of Understanding (MOU) which conferred on the CCRB the power to prosecute substantiated cases where the board recommended "charges and specifications," the most serious discipline.

As a result, the CCRB's Administrative Prosecution Unit (APU) now prosecutes nearly all the cases where the Board recommended the subject officer receive charges and specifications, with limited exceptions. The trials are almost always held at the police department, before an administrative law judge, either the Deputy Commissioner for Trials or an Assistant Deputy Commissioner of Trials. If an officer is found guilty, the penalty can be a warning and admonishment, loss of vacation days, suspension without pay, dismissal probation, or termination from the NYPD. The police commissioner retains the authority to decide whether the discipline is imposed, what level of discipline is imposed, and the penalty imposed.

== Number of complaints ==
In 2006, the CCRB received 7,669 complaints from civilians, and closed 7,399 cases, of which 2,680 were full investigations (meaning that the civilian participated, the officer(s) were identified and an investigation was closed after a full investigation). Approximately 6% of the full investigations resulted in a Substantiated disposition. 262 cases were mediated.

The CCRB is the only fully civilian oversight body for the New York Police Department in the city, and is complemented by the NYPD's Internal Affairs Bureau, and the Mayor's Task Force on Police Corruption, each charged with investigating different types of allegations. The CCRB and its FADO acronym (drawn from the first letters of the categories it investigates: Force, Abuse of Authority, Discourtesy, and Offensive Language) have become familiar throughout the NYPD, forming part of all officers' training at the Police Academy. Additionally, the number of complaints has risen steadily since 2002 as the 311 system was implemented and public awareness of the program grew.

== History ==
Over the years, NYPD officers have come under public scrutiny on account of allegations of corruption, brutality, excessive use of force, and poor firearm discipline. Individual incidents have periodically attracted public attention, among them the case of Lt. Charles Becker, the only NYPD officer sentenced to death by electric chair. Public demand for civilian participation in reviewing police complaints dates back to the Progressive Era. However, little progress was made during the first half of the twentieth century; complainants frequently faced police reprisal, including the risk of arrest on falsified charges. There was no independent oversight to investigate complaints of police misconduct.

In 1953, the NYPD established the original Civilian Complaint Review Board (CCRB) in response to lobbying from the 'Permanent Coordination Committee on Police and Minority Groups,' a coalition of eighteen organizations formed in 1950 to address systemic misconduct against minority communities. A committee of three deputy police commissioners was tasked with investigating civilian complaints. The board was given greater authority under Mayor Robert Wagner in 1955, but the board remained governed within the NYPD; police officers investigated the complaints and the deputy commissioners decided upon recommendation of discipline based on the investigation. The CCRB remained under NYPD jurisdiction without civilian oversight.

In 1965, Mayor John Lindsay appointed former federal judge Lawrence E. Walsh to review and recommend improvements to the department. He recommended that members of the general public, non-police officers, be given substantial authority in any new civilian complaint review board. Walsh's report focused on modernizing the NYPD and recommended civilian representation on the board to ensure public confidence that complaints would be handled impartially. Lindsay eventually formed a search committee, headed by former Attorney General Herbert Brownell, to find civilian candidates to serve on the CCRB. John Cassese (president of the Patrolmen's Benevolent Association), did not welcome civilian presence on the board. Cassese said, "I'm sick and tired of giving in to minority groups with their whims and their gripes and shouting." After much debate, and despite strong opposition from the Patrolmen's Benevolent Association, Mayor Lindsay appointed four civilians to the reconstituted board—the first time in the city's history that people outside the NYPD had reviewed investigations of complaints against officers. The arrangement would not last long.

Opposition to civilian participation came from police unions and officers throughout the department. With the aid of the PBA, Cassese collected enough signatures to place a ballot measure before voters to remove civilians from the board. The PBA argued that civilian oversight would hamper effective policing, while supporters of the reform accused opponents of racism. The campaign was fiercely contested; Cassese's side prevailed, restoring the board to an all-police committee. Civilian board members would not return until the Koch administration.

The Knapp Commission (in the 1970s) and the Mollen Commission (in 1994) led to reforms within the NYPD aimed at improving police accountability. However, possible causes such as low salaries and declining morale have been cited as factors in a rising number of off-duty NYPD officers being arrested and charged for offences ranging from drunk driving to homicide. During the Knapp Commission, the investigation did not involve the CCRB as they independently investigated matters. However, the commission did review the CCRB complaints and used it to verify certain information about police corruption.

Between 1986 and 1987, the New York City Council enacted a piece of legislation that called for imposing some degree of civilian oversight once again. The CCRB was restructured to have private citizens work alongside non-uniformed police officers. Under the new arrangement, Mayor Koch appointed six members and the police commissioner appointed six, working together to investigate civilian complaints under the oversight of police department investigators. However, the return of civilian members was not satisfactory to public opinion as they demanded greater civilian control the following year.

In 1988, the NYPD responded to complaints of drug trafficking, vagrants, squatters, and unlawful groups in Tompkins Square Park by enforcing a pre-existing 1:00 A.M. curfew that had not previously been enforced. The curfew proved unpopular, and animosity toward the police mounted as demonstrators shouted abuse and threw objects at officers. On July 31, a rally protesting the curfew resulted in a confrontation between police and civilians. Four civilians were arrested and four police injured. On August 6, police violently forced demonstrators from the park. Video footage showed officers using their nightsticks to strike protesters and bystanders alike, while using riot shields to obscure their identifying information. After the incident, the CCRB commissioned a special report on the matter, "there is no evidence that any effort was made to limit the use of force . . . Force was used for its own sake." Although the report was critical of the NYPD, the incident generated momentum for an all-civilian CCRB. That would come to pass during the Dinkins administration.

In September 1992, Mayor David Dinkins' support for an independent CCRB was met with intense political and departmental resistance. This culminated in a police-union-sponsored protest at City Hall involving thousands of officers, who blocked traffic to the Brooklyn Bridge and used racial slurs in a demonstration described as "unruly" and "mean-spirited." Before serving as mayor, Rudolph Giuliani participated in the protest.

By 1993, the board became a fully civilian entity with the power to issue subpoenas and recommend discipline. These subpoena powers were specifically granted to enable the agency to obtain video evidence from local media outlets that had previously been inaccessible. The board was underfunded in its early years and struggled to keep pace with the volume of complaints it received. Adequate funding did not materialize until 1997, under the Giuliani administration. In the aftermath of the Abner Louima incident, in which a man was tortured by NYPD officers, the CCRB's budget was steadily increased to allow the agency to hire additional investigators and experienced managers to oversee complaint investigations; it has led to great improvement in the board's investigative work. As of 2017, the CCRB was described as the largest civilian oversight agency in the country, having investigated over 10,000 complaints and contributing to discipline for thousands of officers.

While the CCRB has operated as an independent civilian entity only since 1993, the idea of a board empowered to investigate complaints of police misconduct predates the administration of Robert Wagner, who expanded the original board's powers in 1955. Throughout that earlier period, however, all investigations were conducted by police officers, with findings forwarded to deputy commissioners for a disciplinary recommendation. Because the CCRB has no authority to impose discipline directly, its recommendations are ultimately advisory; the Police Commissioner retains final authority over disciplinary decisions. The Police Commissioner has final authority of the law.

In the CCRB's Annual Report of 2017, the agency received 4,487 complaints from civilians in allegations of Force, Abuse of Authority, Discourtesy, or Offensive Language by members of the NYPD (a 5% increase since 2016). About 58% were allegations of abuse of authority (e.g. unlawful searches of premises, refusals to provide a name or shield number, and threats to arrest a civilian). Through the Data Transparency Initiative (DTI), they are making data (about the complaints and investigations) accessible. Due to body-worn cameras or video evidence, the CCRB was able to make definitive determination of complaints and allegations.

In 2020, ProPublica published a searchable database containing records of public allegations against police officers from the CCRB.

== See also ==
- New York City Office of Administrative Trials and Hearings
