= National Association of Government Employees =

NAGE
- National Association of Government Employees
- Founded: July 16, 1961
- Headquarters: Quincy, Massachusetts
- Location: United States
- Members: 43,460
- Key people: David J. Holway, president
- Affiliations: SEIU, CtW
- Website: www.nage.org

The National Association of Government Employees (NAGE) is a registered labor union with the United States Department of Labor representing approximately 43,000 members in the United States of America. NAGE represents a variety of workers including state and federal government employees, municipal employees, registered nurses, EMS professionals including EMTs and paramedics, firefighters, law enforcement professionals including police and correctional officers and military air technicians. NAGE is an affiliate of the Service Employees International Union (SEIU).

== History ==
The National Association of Government Employees was created July 16, 1961 at a convention of the Federal Employees Veterans Association (FEVA) in Dedham, Massachusetts by Kenneth T. Lyons and Daniel W. Healy. FEVA had been formed by World War II veterans working for the federal government to secure higher wages, better benefits and improved work rules. FEVA's primary base of support were workers at the Charlestown Naval Shipyard. President Kennedy signed Executive Order 10988 granting collective bargaining rights to federal workers. At the 1961 convention, FEVA delegates voted to change the name of the organization to NAGE and change the purpose of the association to that of a labor union.

In 1970, the International Brotherhood of Police Officers (IBPO) affiliated with NAGE. The IBPO affiliation broadening and diversifying the membership base significantly. In 1977, Unit 6, a Massachusetts professional employee bargaining unit, affiliated with NAGE. Unit 6 became the first state bargaining unit to affiliate with the union. Massachusetts state bargaining Unit 1 and Unit 3 joined NAGE shortly thereafter. In 1982, NAGE affiliated with SEIU. Additional affiliations followed with the International Brotherhood of Correctional Officers (IBCO), National Association of Nurses (NAON), and National Health Care Union (NHCU). In the early 1990s, the International Association of EMTs & Paramedics (IAEP) was created to represent employees in emergency medical services. It marked the first time NAGE sought to represent private sector employees.

== NAGE Structure and National Executive Board ==
NAGE is structured with self-autonomous locals who elect their own leadership with national support and leadership provided by NAGE. Local Bylaws are created by each local however all must comport with the NAGE National Constitution and Bylaws. NAGE is governed nationally by a National Executive Board consisting of a President, a National Executive Vice President/Secretary and a National Executive Vice President/Treasurer. The remaining members of the NAGE Executive Board consists of 13 Vice Presidents and 33 Executive Board of Directors Members.

== NAGE Affiliates, Divisions, and Locals ==
=== Affiliates ===
Service Employees International Union (SEIU)

=== Divisions ===
- Army-Air Technicians Union (AATU)
- International Association of EMTs and Paramedics (IAEP)
- International Brotherhood of Police Officers (IBPO)
- International Brotherhood of Correctional Officers (IBCO)
- National Association of Nurses (NAON)
- National Health Care Union (NHCU)
- NAGE Trial Court
- NAGE State
- NAGE Federal

=== Local Union ===
Local R7 23 - Scott AFB IL

Local R14-22- Fort Bliss, El Paso, Texas

Local R1-118 (Senior Community Correction PO, ACPO, FACPO) MASS

Local R1-229 (APO, PO) MASS

Local R1-458 (ACO, CO) MASS
