= Forest Hills High School (New York) =

Public school in New York City

Location
- 67-01 110 St; Forest Hills, Queens, New York 11375; United States; 40.7298°N 73.845°W

Information
- Type: Public
- Motto: It all begins and ends in the classroom
- Established: 1937; 89 years ago
- School district: New York City Department of Education
- School number: Q440
- NCES School ID: 360010001951
- Principal: Paul Wilbur
- Teaching staff: 223.96 (on an FTE basis)
- Grades: 9-12
- Enrollment: 3,429 (2022-2023)
- Student to teacher ratio: 15.31
- Campus: City: Large
- Colors: Blue, Red and Gold
- Mascot: Rangers
- Newspaper: The Beacon
- Yearbook: Forester
- Website: foresthillshs.org

Forest Hills High School (FHHS) is a public high school in Forest Hills, Queens, New York City. Dedicated in 1937, it educates students in grades 9–12 and is operated by the New York City Department of Education. The school serves students from Forest Hills and Rego Park, as well as other nearby Queens neighborhoods such as Corona, East Elmhurst, Elmhurst, Flushing, Jackson Heights, Jamaica, Kew Gardens, Maspeth, Middle Village, and Woodside.

FHHS has often been extremely overcrowded throughout its history, often running several overlapping sessions. Traditionally, a large percentage of FHHS graduates have gone on to attend colleges.

The school is a recipient of the silver medal from U.S. News & World Report's list of the best high schools in the nation.

== History ==
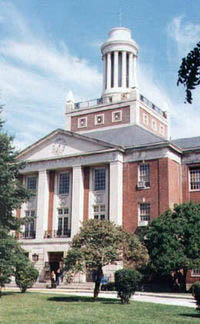
Front facade

Plans for a new high school were in the works since 1937, when the Board of Education announced plans for "a new building at Forest Hills High School, 110th Street and Sixty-sixth Road, Queens, [for] $2,900,000". In 1938, while announcing plans for new construction, the Cord Meyer Development Company, already responsible for the development of most of Forest Hills, mentioned that plans for a high school were under consideration, in order to accommodate the growing population of families in the area and their demands for quality, public education.

In 1939, the Board of Education planned to build a new school adjoining "the World Fair's Grounds" (today's Flushing Meadows-Corona Park), in order to alleviate overcrowding at Newtown, Grover Cleveland, and Jamaica High Schools. Local residents were sending their kids to the aforementioned schools, since the growing community at Forest Hills did not yet have a local high school. It was expected to cost $3,225,000 (equivalent to $74,600,000 in 2025), and it was to be built in a modified Georgian design. The vice president of the board at the time, Ellsworth S. Buck, called it "the most beautiful educational structure in the city... establishing a high point in the city's building program". It was to have shades of red brick, a gray slate roof, and a limestone trim. The school design was innovative in and of itself, with the gymnasiums and auditorium separated from the main unit (building). This created separate gymnasiums for boys and girls, with the extended wings forming a plaza. In order to meet the conditions of the locality, it was designed to be three stories high, with a total of 10 acres (40,000 m^{2}) allotted to it. Partly due to its lot size, an athletic field was built into the back part of the lot, with a grandstand designed for 3,000 people and a "spacious" field for football and track. Designed by the architect Eric Kebbon, ground was to be broken in six months, and the school was expected to open its doors in September 1940.

The school was formally dedicated on April 29, 1941 (it opened on February 3), 7 months behind schedule, but coming in under budget at a total cost of $2,550,000 (equivalent to $55,800,000 in 2025). It was hailed as an architectural masterpiece, "representative of the forward looking objectives of the New York City administration". The dedication ceremonies were attended by Mayor La Guardia. During his speech to the students of the newly dedicated school, he warned them to not be quitters, a subtle reference to the events of World War II brewing on the international scene.

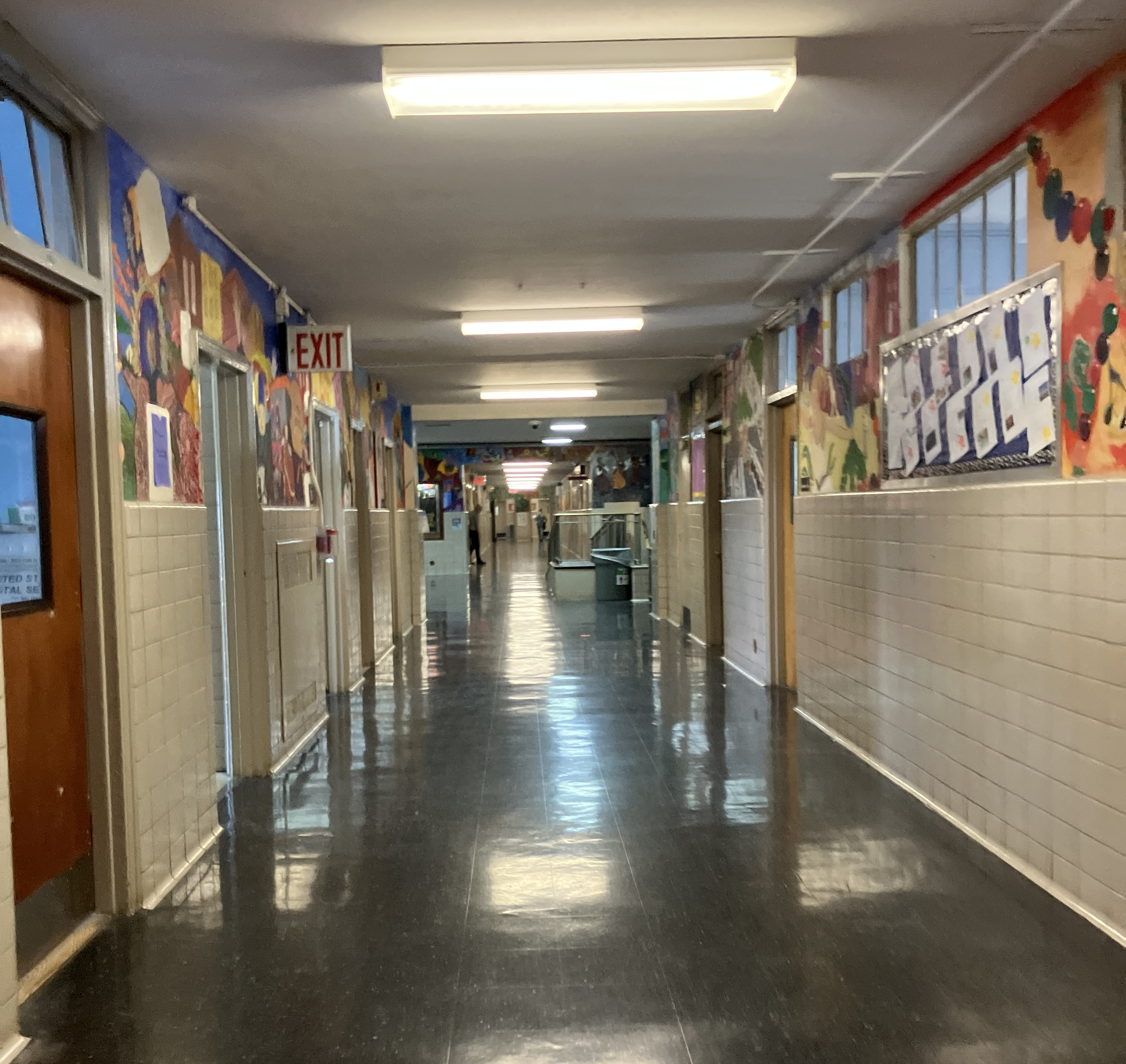
Third floor hallway

The school's final version was a simplified version of the Georgian style, with red brick for its exterior, a buff limestone trim, and grey-black slate for the pitched roofs. At the time of its opening, in addition to regular classrooms, it contained an art shop, a "home-making" room, a model apartment, a cooking room, three art rooms, an art weaving room, a sewing room, a music room, a museum, a library, four typewriting rooms, two "business practice" rooms, ten science classrooms, a science lecture room, laboratories, an exhibit hall, and large separate gymnasiums for girls and boys. The auditorium was spacious, with almost 1,200 seats (there were 3,400 students at the time). It had a commanding view of Flushing Meadows-Corona Park.

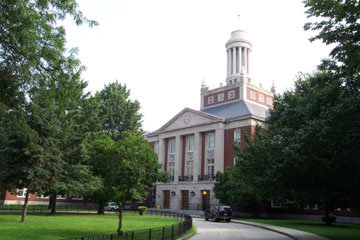
Entrance

Almost immediately, the school developed a reputation for excellence. In 1949, four students from the school qualified to compete in the Westinghouse Science Talent Search (known today as the Regeneron Science Talent Search), two more than Bronx Science at the time. In 1968, it made history as the first school to produce three Westinghouse Scholars in one year. The school's strong science program offered courses simulating a research environment similar to the one in which adult scientists worked.

The school was involved in a fight regarding the construction of a low-income housing project in Forest Hills, as well as a proposed rezoning program that would have excluded sections of the community from attending the school. The school was running triple sessions at the time, and it was feared that the influx of new families would exacerbate the already severe overcrowding at the school. The rezoning was proposed to alleviate the potential overcrowding, by sending some students to the newly opened Hillcrest High School, which was also bitterly opposed by the local community. The rezoning was approved by the courts, despite the battle waged. Some parents tried to enroll their children anyway at Forest Hills, but they were denied. The proposal at the center of the entire controversy, the construction of a housing project, led to accusations of name calling, racism, and anti-Semitism. It was eventually cited by President Richard Nixon when declaring a federal government moratorium on building public housing. By then, Forest Hills "had become shorthand for the racial and class tensions that underpinned much of the national debate about public housing, between its liberal advocates and its conservative opponents". The school was also notably involved in a fight against forced busing. It was discontinued in 1988.

== Academics and admissions ==
Special programs offered in the school include the Carl Sagan Science/Math Honors Academy, the Law & Humanities Institute, the Academy of Instrumental Music/Performing Arts, the Drama Academy, and the zoned program, which are all used as a basis for admissions (a more detailed review of the admissions criteria into these programs is explained further below). Upon acceptance and arrival into the school, other programs, such as Medical Biology/Health Professions and Hospital Science (a year-long program where students intern at a local hospital for one semester; known as Med-Bio), the Academy of Public Service (APS), the Richard A. Brown Honors Law Institute (known as Brown), the Business Academy, Flags Academy (Foreign Language Academy for a Global Society, with a focus on the use of foreign language in the international business community), the Virtual Enterprises Career and Technical Education (CTE) Program are also offered. The school also offers College Now Courses, in collaboration with the City University of New York (CUNY). Its CUNY College Now partner schools are Queens College and LaGuardia Community College.

The school offers several methods for potential students to apply to the school, with several of its programs among the most popular in the city, which are described below.

=== Law & Humanities ===
The Law & Humanities Institute received 4856 applications for 68 seats in 2011. Students in the Law Academy at FHHS take part in a four-year course of study that takes them from an introduction to law and legal writing through a study of civil and criminal law as well as constitutional law. Students within the program have the opportunity to take part in internships with New York law firms and the Queens District Attorney Office, and also benefit from partnerships with NYU, Fordham Law School and Hughes Hubbard & Reed. Each year, select students (typically juniors and seniors) participate in citywide Moot Court and Mock Trial competitions, demonstrating the skills they have developed in the program. Students also have the opportunity to produce a law journal and participate in the Forest Hills Youth Court, a program run in conjunction with Queens Borough Patrol North and the District Attorney's office.

Admissions to the program is based on the Ed-Opt (Educational-Option) Formula, a program designed to attract a wide range of academic performers. Students applying to an Educational Option program are categorized into one of three groups based upon the results of their 7th grade standardized reading test score: Top 16% (High), Middle 68% (Middle), and Bottom 16% (Low). From the applicant pool, half the students are chosen by the school administration and half are selected randomly. However, students who score in the top 2% on the 7th grade English Language Arts reading exam will automatically be matched to the Ed-Opt program if they listed it as their first choice. If a child is in the top 2%, it is indicated on the application next to the reading score. This methodology applies to all Ed-Opt programs within the NYC DOE high school admissions system.

=== The Carl Sagan Science/Math Honors Academy ===
The Carl Sagan Science/Math Honors Academy is a program for Queens residents or students that offers intensive honors level courses in authentic science and math research, and seminars in advanced mathematics and statistics.

=== The Academy of Instrumental Music/Performing Arts & The Drama Academy ===
The Academy of Instrumental Music/Performing Arts offers an instruction on all vocal, band and orchestra instruments, while the Drama Academy provides study in acting and theater communication, as well as film. Applicants must audition to be considered.

=== Zoned ===
For the Zoned program, students must apply and live in the geographic zoned area of the high school in order to receive priority. Students who list the Zoned program as their first choice in the application and live within the geographic zoned area are automatically accepted.

=== College readiness ===
For the 2022–2023 school year, FHHS offered Advanced Placement classes in Art History, Biology, Calculus AB/BC, Chemistry, Chinese Language and Culture, Computer Science A, Computer Science Principles, English Literature and Composition, Environmental Science, French Language and Culture, Macroeconomics, Physics C: Mechanics, Psychology, Spanish Language and Culture, Spanish Literature and Culture, Statistics, US Government, United States History, and World History: Modern. As a general rule, FHHS administrators require students to take AP exams during the month of May. Fee waivers are available for students who qualify for free lunch. The percentage of students who took any AP class was 25% in 2020-21. The percentage of students who took any AP exam and scored a 3 or higher was 28.8% in 2012–2013.

The average SAT scores were 523 in Math, 489 in Critical Reading and 492 in Writing. The average ACT scores were 25 in Math, 22 in English, 23 in Reading, and 22 in Science.

== Athletics ==
Forest Hills currently competes in the Public Schools Athletic League (PSAL), and fields teams in many different sports. They include:

Fall sports

- Varsity bowling (boys' and girls')
- Cross country (boys' and girls')
- Varsity soccer (boys' and girls')
- Varsity and JV volleyball (girls')

Winter sports

- Varsity and JV basketball (boys')
- Girls' varsity basketball
- Indoor track (boys' and girls')
- Wrestling (boys')

Spring sports

- Varsity baseball (boys)
- Varsity softball (girls)
- Varsity volleyball (boys)
- Outdoor track (boys' and girls')
- Varsity tennis (boys' and girls')
- Varsity handball (boys' and girls')
- Varsity lacrosse (girls)

Beginning in September 2012, in addition to the standard PSAL eligibility requirements, FHHS, with a vision of strong academic expectations, began requiring all student athletes to maintain a minimum overall GPA of 75.

== Recognition ==
In June 1998, US President Bill Clinton cited FHHS's "academic and extra-curricular excellence", and it became one of only 124 "Blue Ribbon" schools nationwide. In 2000, US First Lady Hillary Clinton delivered the commencement address, per invitation of Luis Miranda and Crystel Debs.

Jacob J. ("Jack") Lew, a 1972 graduate of FHHS, was then the Clinton administration's Director of the Office of Management and Budget, having been elevated to the post two years earlier.

In the 2011–2012 school year, the school was featured on CNN in a story on how large high schools can succeed. CNN interviewed the principal and produced a video about the daily routine of the school.

The school was awarded its fourth consecutive "A" in a row by the NYC Department of Education, a sign of excellence awarded by the city – making it the only non-specialized school to receive such a distinction in the city.

== Student body ==
=== Enrollment and demographics ===
According to statistics provided by the New York City Department of Education, there were 3,840 students enrolled at Forest Hills for the 2014–2015 academic year.

Grade level	Number of students
9th grade	997
10th grade	969
11th grade	922
12th grade	952

- 25% identified as Asian.
- 10% identified as Black.
- 34% identified as Hispanic/Latino.
- 30% identified as White.
- 2% identified as other races.

6% of the overall student body were classified as English language learners (ELLs), and 53% were eligible for free lunch. 16% of students were with IEPs. 33% were from families deemed eligible for HRA assistance, while 3% were classified as living in temporary housing.

== Notable alumni ==
- Jeph Acheampong – entrepreneur
- Jacob Arabo – jeweler
- Burt Bacharach ('46) – composer
- Remy Banks ('06) – rapper
- Joey Beltram – techno musician
- Francine D. Blau ('63) – economist
- Chuck Blazer ('61) – sports executive
- Art Buchwald ('43; drop-out) – Pulitzer Prize winner
- Ching Ho Cheng ('64) – artist
- Ron Chernow ('66) – biographer, journalist
- Roberta F. Colman ('55) – biochemist
- Peter Daempfle ('88) – author
- Despot – hip-hop artist
- Ian Eagle – sports announcer
- Ronnie Earl (born Ronnie Horvath; '71) – blues guitarist
- Gilbert Eisner – épée fencer
- Eugene Fidell ('61) – lawyer; expert in military law
- Art Garfunkel ('58) – Grammy Award–winning folk-rock singer of the duo Simon & Garfunkel as well as solo musician, actor, poet
- Ernie Grunfeld – former NBA player; former general manager, Washington Wizards
- Maurice Harkless ('11) – NBA player
- Harry Harrison (born Dempsey; '43) – writer
- Marty Ingels (born Ingerman) – actor
- Annette Insdorf – film historian
- Susan Isaacs ('61) – novelist, screenwriter
- Dennis Jacobs – judge, U.S. Court of Appeals for the Second Circuit
- Tony Kappen ('37) – professional basketball player
- Gary Katzmann ('70) – judge, U.S. Court of International Trade
- Robert Katzmann ('70) – chief judge, U.S. Court of Appeals for the Second Circuit
- Bob Keeshan – portrayed Captain Kangaroo television character
- Charles Kelman – ophthalmologist, inventor, and jazz musician
- Gary Kurfirst – promoter, producer, manager, record label executive; inspired the creation of the Woodstock Festival
- Mickey Leigh (born Mitchel Lee Hyman) – memoirist, singer-songwriter; musician of The Rattlers, STOP, and Mutated Music
- Nathan Leventhal – deputy mayor of New York City; president, Lincoln Center for the Performing Arts
- Jacob J. ("Jack") Lew ('72) – U.S. Secretary of the Treasury (2013–17)
- Frank Lorenzo – businessman (corporate raider)
- George Low ('43) – NASA administrator; president, Rensselaer Polytechnic Institute
- Dayssi Olarte de Kanavos – socialite, real-estate developer
- Dee Dee Ramone (dropped out, '69) – bassist of the Ramones
- Joey Ramone ('69) – singer of the Ramones
- Johnny Ramone ('66) – guitarist of the Ramones
- Tommy Ramone ('67) – drummer of the Ramones
- Marc Rich (non-graduate), commodity trader pardoned by President Clinton
- Thomas F. Rosenbaum – president, California Institute of Technology
- Dave Rubinstein – singer of Reagan Youth
- Leonard Schleifer ('70) – co-founder and chief executive officer, Regeneron Pharmaceuticals
- Paul M. Schwartz – expert in information-privacy law and torts; Jefferson E. Peyser Professor, UC Berkeley School of Law; creator of the phrase "YOTO" ("you only tort once")
- Fred Silverman – television producer
- Paul Simon ('58) – Grammy Award–winning folk-rock singer of the duo Simon & Garfunkel as well as a solo musician
- Reby Sky – model, wrestler
- Jerry Springer ('61) – television tabloid talk show host; mayor of Cincinnati
- Dick Stockton ('60) – sports announcer
- Lubert Stryer – biochemist
- Dennis Tito ('58) – first space tourist
- Danny Troob ('66) – Tony Award– and Academy Award–winning orchestrator and arranger
- Tatiana Troyanos ('56) – mezzo-soprano opera singer
- Leslie Urdang ('72) – film and theatre producer
- John Vinocur – journalist
- Katharine Weber – novelist
- Leslie West – rock guitarist
- William Westney – chairman music department, Texas Tech University; pianist and music instructor
- Steve Wilstein ('66) – National Headliner Award–winning sports columnist
- Betsy Wollheim – science-fiction publisher
