= Ghanaian Americans =

Americans of Ghanaian birth or descent

Total population
- Ghanaian Americans; 119,789 (2013 American Community Survey); 136,967 (Ghanaian-born, 2014)

Regions with significant populations
- New York City, Boston, Philadelphia, Columbus, Lansing, Chicago, Milwaukee, Washington, D.C., Providence, Newark, Worcester, Hartford, Delaware, Maryland, Virginia, North Carolina, Atlanta, Miami, Orlando, Kentucky, Minnesota, Iowa, Texas, Denver, Seattle, California, Idaho, Oklahoma

Languages
- English, French, Akan, Kwa, Twi, Ga, Ewe, Dagbani other languages of Ghana

Religion
- Predominantly Christian, Islam, other minorities.

Related ethnic groups
- Ghanaians, African Americans

Ghanaian Americans are an ethnic group of Americans of full or partial Ghanaian ancestry or Ghanaian immigrants who became naturalized citizen of the United States.

== History ==
=== Early history ===
The first people to arrive from the region then known as the Gold Coast were brought as slaves via the Atlantic slave trade. Several ethnic groups such as the Akan, the Ganga or the Ga people were imported as well to the modern United States and the third of these groups appear to have an influence on the language of the Gullah people. Because Ghanaian ports were major routes for European slave traders. Captives from ethnic groups and tribes from all over West Africa were brought there to be held and sent to the New World. Most them were imported to South Carolina, Virginia and Georgia, although other places in the United States, such as Spanish Florida and French Louisiana also had many slaves of this origin.

=== Recent immigration ===
Ghanaians began arriving in the United States en masse after the 1960s and in the 1970s amidst the civil rights movement and the decolonization of Africa. In 1957, Ghana became the first African country to gain independence from colonial rule. Ghana's first president, Kwame Nkrumah, studied at American universities and worked with Black American leaders for the rights of Black people around the world. Notable African-American intellectuals and activists such as W. E. B. Du Bois and Malcolm X used Ghana as a symbol of black achievement. Most of the early immigrants from Ghana to the United States were students who came to get a better education and planned on using the education acquired in the United States to better Ghana. However, many Ghanaians that migrated in the 1980s and 1990s, came to get business opportunities. In difficult economic times, the number of Ghanaians who emigrated to the United States was small. However, when these economic problems were paralyzed, they built resources for their emigration to the United States.

== Population and geographic distribution ==
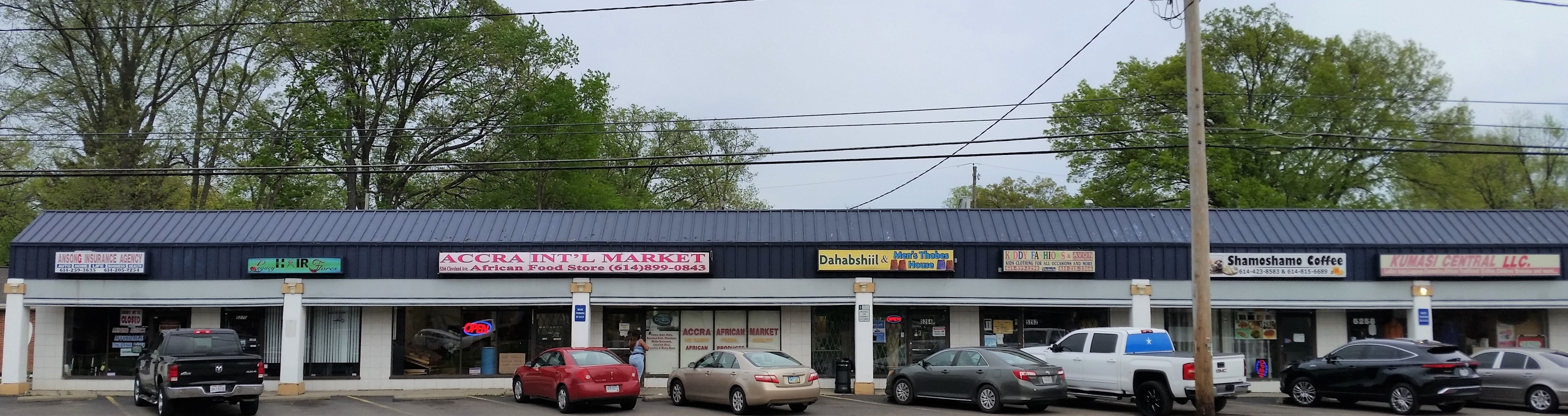
This strip mall on Cleveland Avenue in Columbus has several Ghanaian businesses: an insurance agency, a hair salon, a grocery store, a cafe, and clothing stores.

First- and second-generation Ghanaian immigrations to the U.S. make up a small portion (0.3%) of the total number of foreign-born Americans. New York City metropolitan area and Washington, D.C. metropolitan area have the highest numbers of Ghanaian immigrants. The state with the largest number of immigrants from Ghana is New York, followed by Virginia, New Jersey, and Maryland.

The 2010 U.S. census tallied 91,322 Ghanaian Americans living in the United States.

The U.S. Census Bureau's American Community Survey for 2015 to 2019 estimated the total number of immigrants from Ghana in the U.S. to be 178,400. The top five counties of residence were The Bronx (19,500), Prince William County, Virginia (6,400), Franklin County, Ohio (6,400), Cook County, Illinois (5,200), Essex County, New Jersey (5,100), Montgomery County, Maryland (5,000), Worcester County, Massachusetts (4,700), Prince George's County, Maryland (4,500), Gwinnett County, Georgia (4,100), Fairfax County, Virginia (3,300), Brooklyn (3,200), Tarrant County, Texas (2,700), Los Angeles County, California (2,500), Middlesex County, New Jersey (2,400), and Dallas County, Texas (2,400).

== Education and languages ==
A 2015 report by the Migration Policy Institute noted that the educational attainment of first- and second-generation Ghanaian-Americans was similar to the overall U.S. population. About 18% of Ghanaian diaspora members in the U.S. age 25 and over had a bachelor's degree as their highest credential, compared to 20% in the overall U.S. population ages 25 and older. About 12% of Ghanaian diaspora members had an advanced degree, compared to about 11% of the overall U.S. population.

Ghanaian Americans speak English, and often also speak Akan, Ga, Ewe, and Twi. Ghanaians have an easier time adapting to life in the United States than other immigrants because their homeland of Ghana has the English language as the official language and it is spoken by the majority of Ghana's population.

== Organizations and civic life ==
A 2015 study identified 63 Ghanaian diaspora groups based in the U.S.; these include social groups, charitable and humanitarian organizations, and professional associations (such as the Ghana Physicians and Nurses Association), and regional groups (such as the Ghana National Council of Chicago). Some Ghanaian American organizations are pan-ethnic, while others focus on specific ethnic backgrounds, such as Ewe, Asante, and Gadangme. Most organizations do not have full-time professional staff or large budgets; the largest Ghanaian American organization in terms of revenue was the Ashesi University Foundation, which is based on Seattle.

== Notable people ==
=== Sports ===
- Joseph Addai, former American football runningback of the National Football League
- Xavier Adibi, former American football linebacker
- Freddy Adu, former soccer player
- Rhamat Alhassan, volleyball middle blocker and member of the U.S. national team
- Ezekiel Ansah, American football defensive end for the Detroit Lions of the National Football League
- Jon Asamoah, former offensive guard for the National Football League
- Larry Asante, American football safety
- Joshua Clottey, professional boxer who held the IBF welterweight title from 2008-2009
- Lalas Abubakar, Soccer player for Colorado Rapids
- Ebenezer Ekuban, American football defensive end of the National Football League for the Dallas Cowboys
- Yunus Musah, Soccer player for United States men's national soccer team and AC Milan
- Kofi Kingston, professional wrestler
- Nana Kuffour
- Nazr Mohammed
- Prince Nana
- Akwasi Owusu-Ansah
- Charlie Peprah
- Robbie Russell
- C. J. Sapong
- Visanthe Shiancoe
- Clint Sintim
- Jeremy Zuttah
- Orleans Darkwa
- Eli Apple
- Zion Suzuki

=== Music, arts and entertainment ===
- Virgil Abloh
- Naki Akarobettoe
- Rhian Benson
- Michael Blackson
- Sufe Bradshaw
- Roseanne A. Brown
- William Chapman Nyaho
- Jay Ghartey
- Lance Gross
- Boris Kodjoe
- Kwesi Boakye
- Vic Mensa
- Ian Jones-Quartey
- Kwei Quartey
- Sam Richardson
- Kofi Siriboe
- Moses Sumney
- Rashad McCrorey
- Lovie Simone
- Dawin
- Bozoma Saint John
- Kweku Collins

=== Other ===
- Desmond Daniel Amofah
- Kwame Anthony Appiah
- Kwabena Boahen
- Joy Buolamwini
- Paul Cuffee
- Ave K. P. Kludze, Jr.
- Samuel Koranteng-Pipim
- Monica Owusu-Breen
- Jonathan Corbblah
- Emmanuel K. Akyeampong
- Oral Ofori
- Daniel A. Wubah
- Jeph Acheampong
- Jojo Awinongya Jr.
- Kimathi Donzooya

== See also ==
- African immigrants to the United States
- Ghanaian Australians
- Ghanaian Canadians
- Ghanaians in the United Kingdom
- Ghanaians in the Netherlands
- Ghanaians in France
- Ghanaians in Germany
- Ghanaians in Italy
- Ghana–United States relations
