= Philip Mayer =

Philip Mayer may refer to:

- Philip Mayer Kaiser (1913–2007), American diplomat
- Philip Frederick Mayer (1781–1858), United States Lutheran clergyman
