= Dayssi Olarte de Kanavos =

Colombian-American socialite

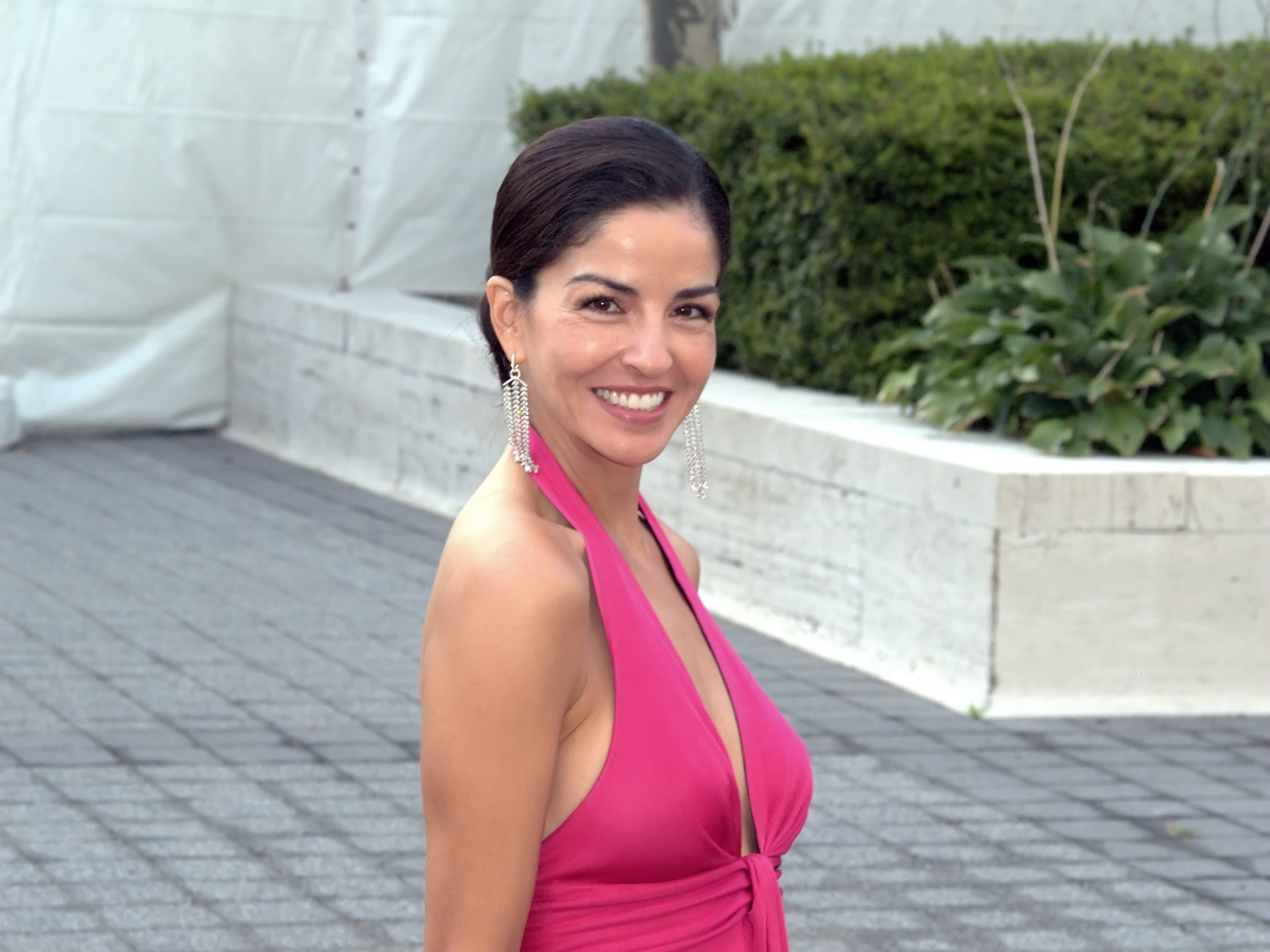
- Olarte de Kanavos at the Metropolitan Opera in 2009
- Born: Dayssi Olarte; 1963 (age 62–63); Bogotá, Colombia
- Education: Forest Hills High School
- Alma mater: Cornell University; New York University
- Occupations: socialite, businesswoman, philanthropist
- Spouse: Paul Kanavos
- Parent(s): Daniel Olarte; Pina Olarte

Dayssi Olarte de Kanavos (born 1963) is a Colombian-American socialite, philanthropist, and real estate developer. She is the president and chief operating officer of Flag Luxury Group, a New York-based real estate development company that she co-founded with her husband in 1997. Olarte de Kanavos serves on the board of New Yorkers For Children and has served as a committee member for Save Venice Inc., Alliance française, and the Met Gala. She was listed in a Vogue best-dressed list in 1999 and was featured on the cover of Town & Country in 2000.

== Early life, family, and education ==
Olarte de Kanavos was born in Bogotá, Colombia, in 1963 to Daniel and Pina Olarte. Her father, who came from a wealthy family that owned a large ranch in Santander, moved to Bogotá and became a successful real-estate investor. The Olarte family was considerably wealthy, and maintained a household with "maids everywhere". When Olarte de Kanavos was nine years old, her mother enrolled as a graduate student at Barnard College, relocating the family to New York City. They moved into a brownstone apartment on the Upper East Side and lived more simply than in Colombia, employing a nanny but no household staff. Olarte de Kanavos' parents later separated, and she returned to Bogotá with her sisters, Gloria and Norma, and father while her mother stayed in the United States. Shortly after their move back, her parents divorced.

Her older sisters were debuted in Bogotá society shortly before their father lost most of his savings through a bad investment. As a consequence of the family's reduced circumstances, the Olartes dismissed the household staff and her father stopped sending money to New York for his ex-wife. She and her sisters then moved to New York to live with their mother in Forest Hills, Queens, who was working as a translator for the United Nations. Olarte de Kanavos attended Forest Hills High School, where she was a member of the basketball and volleyball teams and worked for the school newspaper.

In 1982, Olarte de Kanavos enrolled at Cornell University, where she was a member of Alpha Epsilon Phi and studied hotel administration at the Cornell University School of Hotel Administration. As a college student, she modelled in commercials for Coca-Cola and Reebok. During one summer vacation, Olarte de Kanavos brought Roberta Petruzzi, an Italian-Mexican woman and fellow Cornell student, home to Bogotá. Petruzzi joined Olarte de Kanavos' uncle, older sister Gloria, and some aunts and cousins on a hunting trip. On the way there, the private plane crashed, killing everyone on board. After the accident, Olarte de Kanavos returned to school, graduating from Cornell in 1985.

Olarte de Kanavos moved to Manhattan after finishing college, working as a real-estate consultant and as a waitress at the restaurant Canastel's on Park Avenue. During this time, she enrolled as a graduate student at New York University, studying real estate finance and development.

== Adult life, career, and society ==
While a master's student at New York University, Olarte de Kanavos dated Prince Clemente Imperiali, an Italian aristocrat. Through Imperiali, she became acquainted with a group of Italian expatriates who involved her with the Junior International Club, an event-promoting network of wealthy Europeans and South Americans. In 1985, in her first year at NYU, she met the founder of the Junior International Club, Marc Biron, at the Palladium. Biron hired her to promote events for the club, where she served on a junior committee for Save Venice Inc. In 1991, after the relationship with Imperiali ended, Olarte de Kanavos met Greek-American real-estate developer Paul Kanavos at a dinner party. They were married at the Metropolitan Club in 1993. She and her husband have three children, Peter, Sophia, and Nicholas. The Kanavos family live in an Upper East Side Park Avenue apartment.

In 1996 Olarte de Kanavos and her mother were featured in a Mothers and Daughters spread in the May issue of Town & Country. In August 1999, she was featured in Vogue's best-dressed list. In 2000, she was featured on the cover of Town & Country, alongside Nadja Swarovski, in a picture taken at the Save Venice masquerade ball.

Olarte de Kanavos was appointed by Lucile Peyrelongue to serve as chairwoman of the junior committee for Alliance française. Following her success as chairwoman, she was placed on a committee overseeing the Met Gala and on the Memorial Sloan-Kettering Associates Committee. She has also been involved with New Yorkers For Children.

Since 1997, Olarte has served as the president and chief operating officer of Flag Luxury Group, a New York City–based real estate development company she co-founded with her husband.

In 2007, Olarte de Kanavos and her husband purchased an 11,500-square-foot mansion in Southampton for $17.495 million.
