= Philip Frederick Mayer =

American clergyman

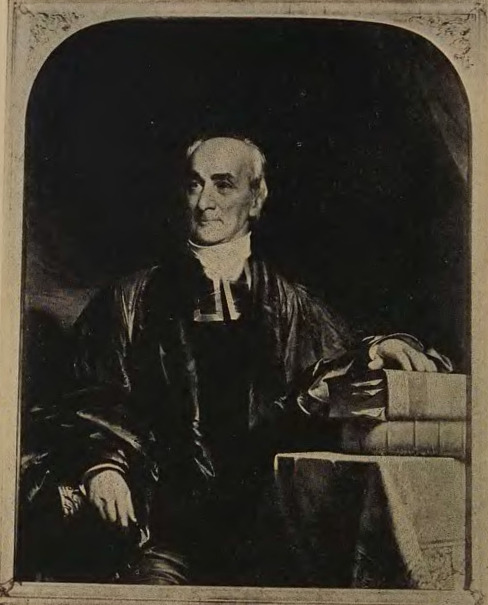
- portrait by John Neagle
- Born: 1 April 1781
- Died: 16 April 1858 (aged 77)

Philip Frederick Mayer (1 April 1781, in New York City – 16 April 1858, in Philadelphia) was a United States Lutheran clergyman.

He was graduated at Columbia in 1799. He then studied theology under John Christopher Kunze at the newly formed Hartwick Seminary, and is believed to be the seminary's first graduate. Mayer was licensed to preach, 1 September 1802, and ordained to the Lutheran ministry in the following year. In 1803 he became pastor at Athens, New York. In 1806 he accepted the pastorate of St. John's English Lutheran Church in Philadelphia, the first exclusively English Lutheran congregation in the United States. He remained in this position until his death.

He received the degree of D.D. from the University of Pennsylvania in 1823 and from Columbia in 1837. In 1804 he had refused to accept the same honor from Harvard on the ground that he was too young, and he also declined the provostship of the University of Pennsylvania in 1823.

Mayer was active in benevolent enterprises in Philadelphia. In 1808 he was associated in the formation of the Pennsylvania Bible Society, the first institution of the kind in the United States, of which he was for many years an active manager and at the time of his death its presiding officer. He was for many years a trustee of the University of Pennsylvania. In 1817 he did much to establish the system of public education in Pennsylvania. For many years before his death he was president of the board of managers of the Institution for the Deaf and Dumb.

In 1812 the ministerium of Pennsylvania appointed a committee to prepare a suitable collection of English hymns for public worship, to which was to be appended a liturgy, and Mayer was entrusted with this work. In 1833 a new and enlarged edition was issued, of which he again had charge. He published the sermon that he delivered at the 50th anniversary of his pastorate in Philadelphia.
