= Education in Pennsylvania =

There are numerous elementary, secondary, and higher institutions of learning in the Commonwealth of Pennsylvania, which is home to 500 public school districts, thousands of private schools, many publicly funded colleges and universities, and over 100 private institutions of higher education.

In general, under state law, school attendance in Pennsylvania is mandatory for a child from the age of 8 until the age of 17, or until graduation from an accredited high school, whichever is earlier.

Pennsylvania has a high school graduation rate of 90.2% in 2018. Additionally, 27.5% have gone on to obtain a bachelor's degree or higher. In 2009, the U.S. Census Bureau reported that 87.9% of Pennsylvanians aged 25 or older have attained a high school diploma or better.

== Primary and secondary education ==
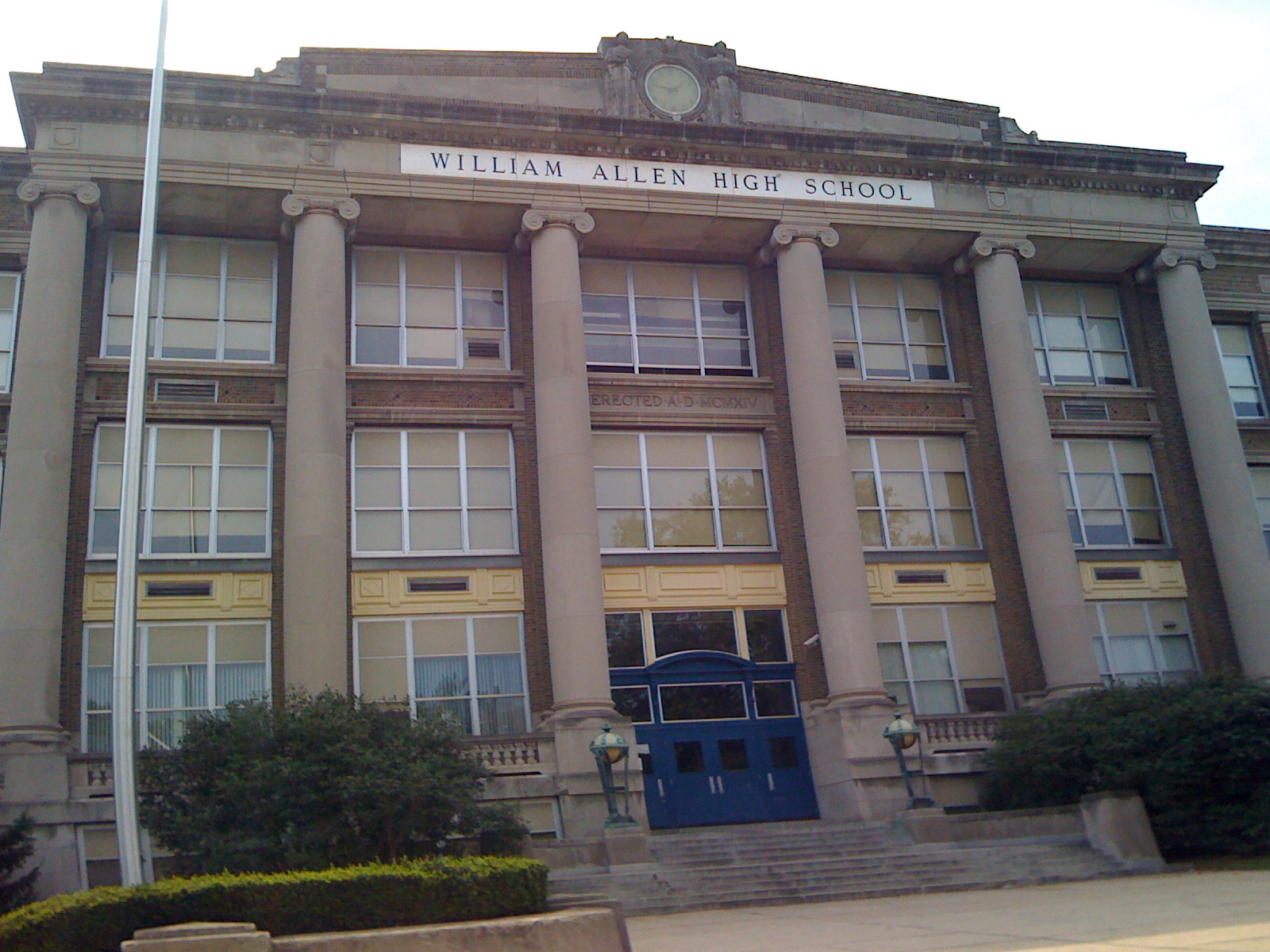
William Allen High School, one of Allentown, Pennsylvania's two large public high schools, July 2008

Pennsylvania's public schools are operated and funded under the authority of the General Assembly and local school boards, whose members are locally elected (serve 4 year terms). There are many types of public schools, including elementary, intermediate, middle school, junior high, high, junior-senior high, vocational-technical, people and charter schools. Each public school is headed by a school principal, who reports to the superintendent of schools appointed by the board of the school district.

There are 500 public school districts in Pennsylvania, consisting of 3,287 schools and 120 charter schools. Three school districts do not operate high schools: Midland Borough School District, Duquesne City School District and Saint Clair Area School District due to low enrollment coupled with financial constraints. As of the 2005–2006 school year, there were 1,871,060 students enrolled in public schools in Pennsylvania, of whom 74.6% were Caucasian, 15.9% were African-American, 6.8% were Hispanic, 2.6% were Asian/Pacific Islander, and 0.2% were Native Americans. The average per pupil expenditure was $10,738, and the pupil/teacher ratio was 15.2:1.

As of the 2007–2008 school year, there were 265,545 students enrolled in private K-12 schools in Pennsylvania.

State students consistently do well in standardized testing. In 2007, Pennsylvania ranked 14th in mathematics, 12th in reading, and 10th in writing for 8th grade students.

In 2004–2005, Pennsylvania elementary and secondary schools ranked 8th in revenue and 11th in spending out of 50 states and the federal district. In 2009 Pennsylvania spends $25 billion in public education when federal, state and local taxation dollars are combined.

== Governance ==
Many regulations and programs regarding elementary, secondary, and higher education are administered by the Pennsylvania Department of Education, which is led by the secretary of education appointed by the governor and confirmed by the Pennsylvania State Senate.

The current secretary of education is Pedro A. Rivera, who was nominated by Governor Tom Wolf in January 2015, and confirmed by the state senate in June 2015.

The State Board of Education is the principal administrative regulatory body for elementary, secondary, and higher education in the state. It has numerous responsibilities, including approving or disapproving an application for the creation of a new school district, or change in the boundaries of an existing school district; applying for and administering federal grants for education; adopting master plans for basic and higher education; and adopting policies for the secretary of education to apply in regulating schools and universities.

The State Board of Education has 22 members, ten of whom serve as the Board's Council of Basic Education and ten of whom serve on the Board's Council of Higher Education. Seventeen members are appointed by the governor, with the approval of the Senate, and each serves a six-year term. Four members of the board are members of the General Assembly who serve as long as they hold majority and minority chairs of the House and Senate Education Committees. The current chairperson of the State Board of Education, also appointed by the governor, is Joe Torsella. The secretary of education serves as the chief executive officer of the board and does not vote as a member of the board.

The state is divided into 29 intermediate units, which provide services to the 500 public school districts and 2,400 non-public institutions.

== Higher education ==
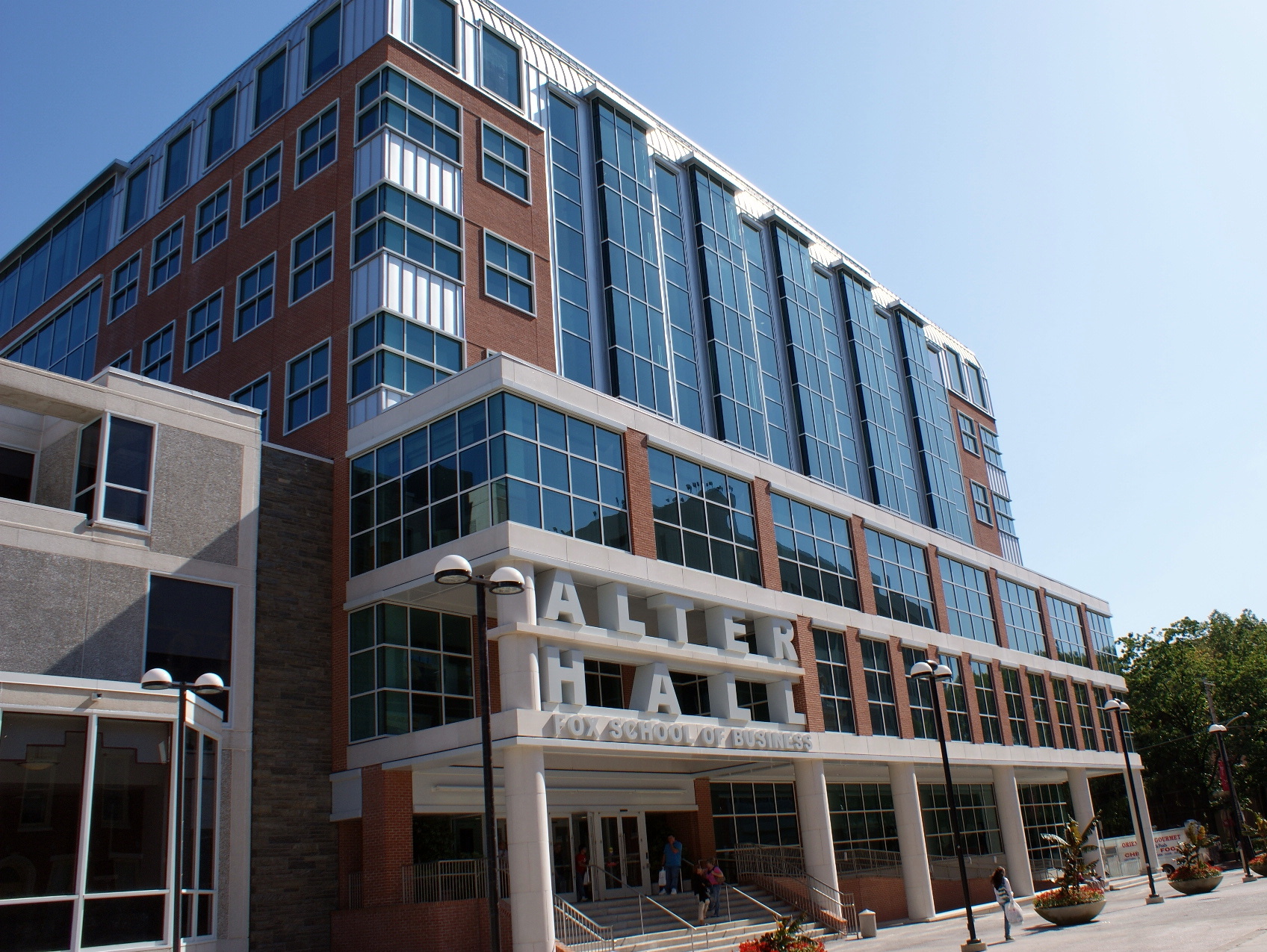
Alter Hall at the Fox School of Business and Management at Temple University in Philadelphia, October 2009

"Pennsylvania has the fourth most higher education institutions of any state," according to Inside Higher Ed, with 250 universities and colleges. The state is ranked 2nd among the nation's top destinations for freshman out-of-state college students, according to NPR/PBS affiliate WHYY, citing a study by the Association of Independent Colleges and Universities of Pennsylvania (AICUP). And Pennsylvania is 3rd in the nation for the quantity of "Best Colleges" according to the Wall Street Journal.

There are dozens of notable private liberal arts colleges and universities located throughout Pennsylvania, as well as many publicly supported community colleges and universities. The state provides funding to (1) the Commonwealth System of Higher Education, consisting of four universities; (2) the Pennsylvania State System of Higher Education, consisting of 14 universities; and (3) 14 community colleges.

=== Commonwealth System of Higher Education ===
The Commonwealth System of Higher Education consists of four prominent universities, which are publicly supported but are operated and controlled independently. These institutions are:

- Lincoln University (Pennsylvania), which serves approximately 2,000 students.
- Pennsylvania State University, one of the ten largest public universities in the United States, which serves more than 84,000 undergraduate and graduate students at 24 campuses, the largest of which is in State College, Pennsylvania.
- Temple University, which serves over 34,000 undergraduate and graduate students on several campuses in the Greater Philadelphia area.
- University of Pittsburgh, which serves approximately 34,000 undergraduate and graduate students in western Pennsylvania.

=== Pennsylvania State System of Higher Education ===
The Pennsylvania State System of Higher Education consists of 14 universities in which more than 112,500 students are enrolled. It is led by a 20-member board of governors, each of whom serves a four-year term, with the exception of three students, who are chosen from among the universities’ student government association presidents and serve until graduation. The members include individuals selected by the governor of Pennsylvania, and four legislators chosen by the majority and minority leaders of the state senate and House of Representatives. The governor of Pennsylvania or a designee also is a board member, as is the state secretary of education.

=== Community colleges ===
Pennsylvania community colleges served 189,000 students in credit programs and over 256,000 students in non-credit programs during the 2005–2006 school year. On average, annual 2005-2006 tuition and fees were $2,327. Many community college students transfer to four-year programs at colleges and universities.

=== Financial aid ===
The Pennsylvania Higher Education Assistance Agency is a financial aid organization which provides grants, administers loans, and affords other services to post-secondary students.

== History ==
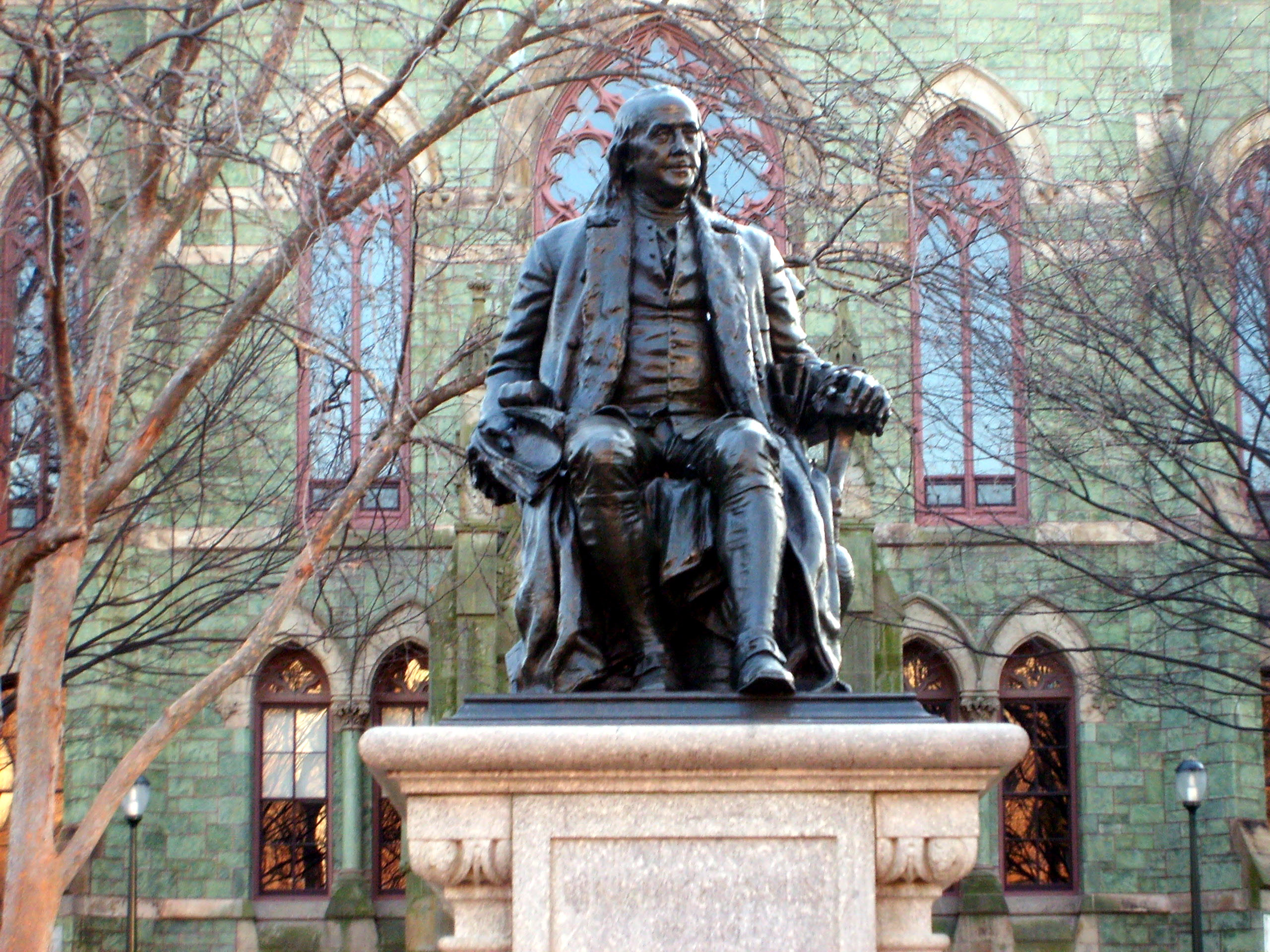
Benjamin Franklin statue on the campus of the University of Pennsylvania, an Ivy League institution in Philadelphia, August 2007

Data from the indentured servant contracts of German immigrant children in Pennsylvania from 1771 to 1817 showed that the number of children receiving education increased from 33.3% in 1771–1773 to 69% in 1787–1804. Additionally, the same data showed that the ratio of school education versus home education rose from .25 in 1771–1773 to 1.68 in 1787–1804. The increase in the number of children being educated, and the fact that more students were being educated in school rather than at home, could help explain how near-universal literacy was achieved by 1840.

Until the Civil War, almost all education was conducted either in private schools or at home. Public schools first came on the scene in the second half of the nineteenth century.

The forerunner to the Pennsylvania Department of Education was created in 1834. The State Board of Education, which adopts regulations for the department, was created in 1963.

=== German subculture ===
According to Elizabeth Pardoe, by 1748, the future of the German subculture in Pennsylvania was in doubt, and most of the attention focused on German language schools. Lutheran schools in Germantown and Philadelphia thrived, but most outlying congregations had difficulty recruiting students. Furthermore, Lutherans were challenged by Moravians who actively recruited Lutherans to their schools. In the 1750s, Benjamin Franklin led a drive for free charity schools for German students, with the proviso that the schools would minimize Germanness. The leading Lutheran school in Philadelphia school had internal political problems in the 1760s, but Pastor Henry Melchior Muhlenberg resolved them. The arrival of John Christopher Kunze from Germany in 1770 gave impetus to the Halle model in America. Kunze began training clergy and teachers in the Halle system. Reverend Heinrich Christian Helmuth arrived in 1779 and called for preaching only in German, while seeking government subsidies. A major issue was the long-term fate of German culture in Pennsylvania, with most solutions focused on schools. Helmuth saw schools as central to the future of the ethnic community. However most Lutheran clergy believed in assimilation and rejected Helmuth's call to drop English instruction. Kunze's seminary failed, but the first German college in the United States was founded in Lancaster, Pennsylvania, in 1787 as Franklin College; it was later renamed Franklin and Marshall College.

=== Higher education ===
The fourth-oldest institution of higher learning in America is the University of Pennsylvania, founded by Benjamin Franklin in 1740.

Lincoln University, founded in 1854 and later named for President Abraham Lincoln, was the nation's first historically black university to provide arts and sciences education and degrees to African-American students.

== See also ==
- Pennsylvania Department of Education
- School Choice in Pennsylvania
