= Peter Daempfle =

Peter A. Daempfle (born 1970) is an American educator and author in the field of popular science. He teaches biology at SUNY Delhi.

== Biography ==
=== Early life and education ===
Daempfle was born on May 5, 1970, in Ridgewood, Queens, New York, to German refugee parents. He was the class valedictorian at Forest Hills High School in 1988. He earned a B.A. in Biology from Hartwick College, an M.S. in Biology from the University at Albany, an M.S. in Education from The College of Saint Rose, and a Ph.D. in Biology Education from the University at Albany.

=== Career ===
From 2001–2009, Peter A. Daempfle served as a science advisor to the George W. Bush Administration's No Child Left Behind Act (NCLB). He is known for publications on science and on studying the high school-college science "divide." Daempfle has authored numerous books and articles. He is notable for college biology textbooks and books about science in the popular culture.

=== Skepticism ===
Daempfle is the author of Good Science, Bad Science, Pseudoscience, and Just Plain Bunk: How to Tell the Difference (2013).

=== Book Publications ===
- Science and Society: Scientific Thought and Education for the 21st Century, 1st ed. (2012) Jones and Bartlett Learning: Burlington, MA.
- Good Science, Bad Science, Pseudoscience, and Just Plain Bunk: How to Tell the Difference. 1st ed. (2013) Rowman and Littlefield Publishers, MD.
- Essential Biology, 1st ed. (2016), Kendall/Hunt Publishers.

==== Research Articles ====
- Faculty Assumptions about the Student Characteristics Required for Success in Introductory College Biology. Bioscene, v. 28 n. 4 pp. 19–33 Dec 2002
- An Analysis of the High Attrition Rates among First Year College Science, Math, and Engineering Majors. Journal of College Student Retention, v. 5 n. 1 pp. 37–52 2003–2004
- The Effects of Instructional Approaches on the Improvement of Reasoning in Introductory College Biology: A Quantitative Review of Research. Bioscene, v. 32 n. 4 pp. 22–31 Dec 2006
