= Jeph Acheampong =

Ghanan-American businessman

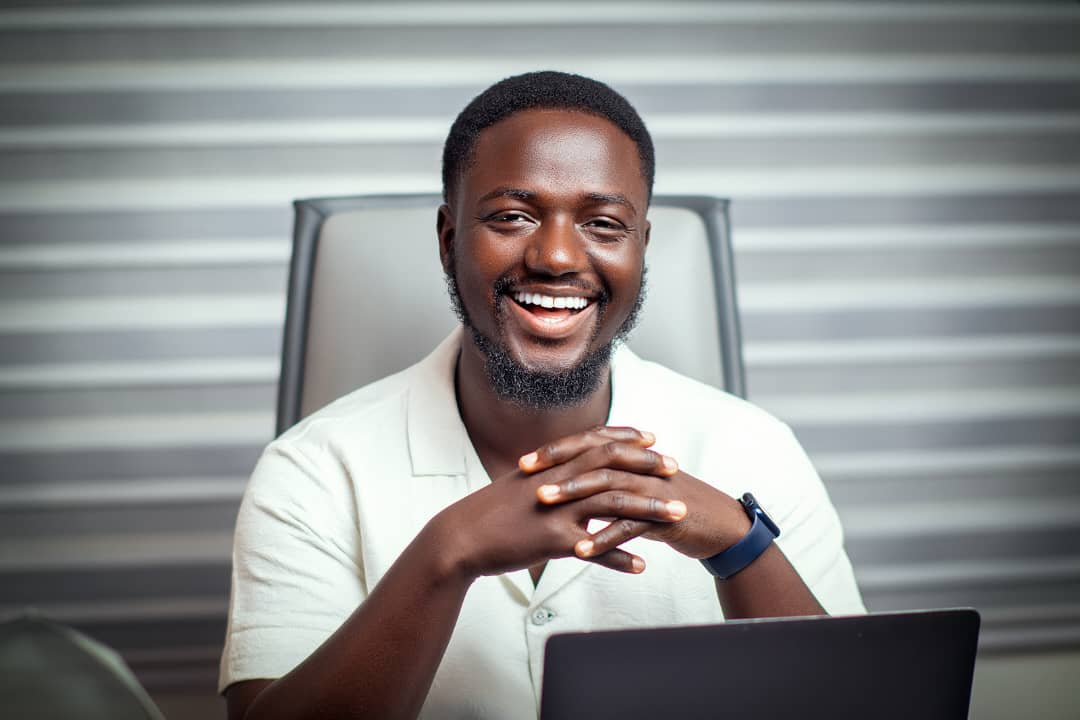
- Born: 17 March 1994 (age 32)
- Education: New York University, Harvard University
- Occupation: Entrepreneur
- Organization: Blossom Academy
- Website: jacheampong.com

Jeph Acheampong is a Ghanaian-American businessman.

He is an Expo Live Global Innovator, a World Economic Forum Global Shaper, and was named a Future of Ghana Pioneer.

== Early life and education ==
Acheampong was born in Accra, Ghana and grew up in New York. He attended the Morning Star School in Ghana. He graduated high school in 2012 from Forest Hills High School (New York). Acheampong went on to study economics at New York University. Later, he pursued a masters at Harvard University.

== Career ==
While at New York University, Acheampong founded Anansi Global, a humanitarian fashion company. In 2018, he founded Blossom Academy, Ghana's first Data science academy.™ He was also a founding member of Esusu Financial, and a co-founder Blossom Corporate Training, which upskills working professionals in leadership skills.

In 2016, he was awarded the NYU President’s Service Award. In September 2021, he was featured on CNN’s What's the Big Idea and was recognized by Nigerian newspapers as 1 of the 5 Most Influential People making an impact.

In 2022, the Government of Ghana appointed Jeph Acheampong to support the development of the Ghana National Artificial Intelligence Strategy 2023-2033. He was invited as a speaker by West Africa Business Forum for youths and young women entrepreneurs from 15 countries across Africa, and also at the 2024 World Youth Development Forum in Guangzhou, China.

He is an advocate for systemic change that addresses the root causes of poverty and unemployment. In 2025, he was listed among the top ten Under-40 African Ivy League Graduates making an impact in Africa, and a finalist in the Harvard President’s Innovation Challenge.

== Awards and recognition ==
He is a 2018 Princeton in Africa Fellow, a 2023 Acumen Fellow, and a 2024 Social Innovation + Change Initiative Fellow at the Harvard Kennedy School.
