= Salvatore Cassano =

New York City Fire Department commissioner

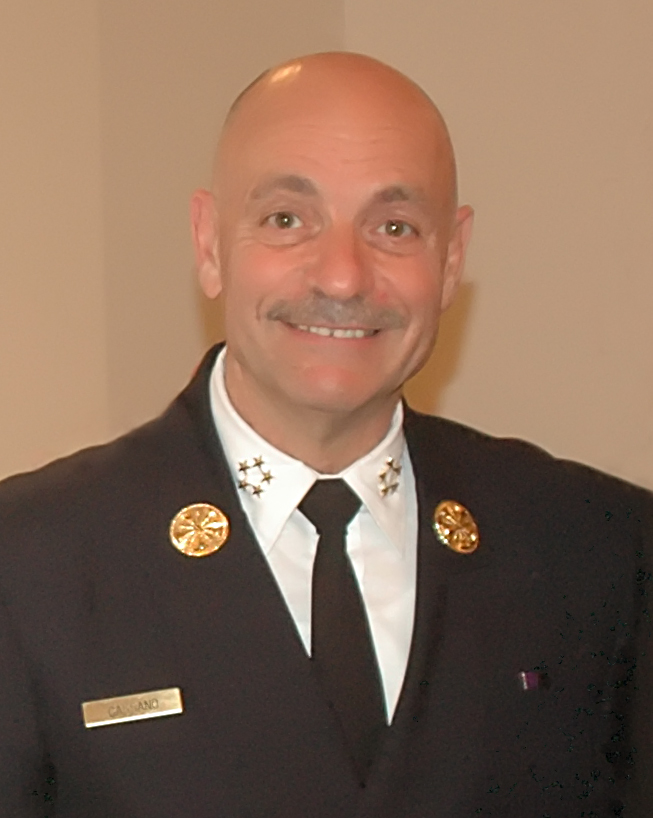
- Salvatore Cassano, as Chief of Department 2008

32nd New York City Fire Commissioner
- In office January 1, 2010 – June 9, 2014
- Mayor: Michael Bloomberg; Bill de Blasio
- Preceded by: Nicholas Scoppetta
- Succeeded by: Daniel A. Nigro

Personal details
- Born: Salvatore Joseph Cassano; January 22, 1945 (age 81) Brooklyn, New York, U.S.
- Spouse: Theresa Wallace (m. 1978)
- Education: John Jay College of Criminal Justice; New York City College of Technology

Salvatore Joseph "Sal" Cassano (born 22 January 1945) served as the 32nd New York City Fire Commissioner from 2010 to 2014.

== NYC Fire Commissioner ==
His appointment as New York City Fire Commissioner by New York City Mayor Michael R. Bloomberg to succeed Nicholas Scoppetta was announced on 21 December 2009, and became effective on 1 January 2010. Cassano was sworn in on 11 January 2010. On May 9, 2014, Daniel A. Nigro was announced as Cassano's successor as commissioner of the FDNY, effective June 9, 2014.

== Background ==
A son of Italian-American immigrants, Cassano was born in the Carroll Gardens section of Brooklyn, New York, and lives on Staten Island. After serving in the United States Army during the Vietnam War, he began a career as a firefighter in November 1969. He earned an associate degree in fire protection technology from New York City College of Technology in 1970, and a Bachelor of Science degree in fire science from John Jay College of Criminal Justice in 1976.

== Career ==
Cassano served in Manhattan and Brooklyn, and was honored five times during his career for bravery. He received commendations for meritorious acts between 1979 and 1983 for rescuing five people from burning apartments, all in Brooklyn.

Cassano held every rank in the department during his career (beginning as a firefighter in 1969), including promotions to Lieutenant in August 1977, Captain in April 1984, Battalion Chief in August 1987, Deputy Chief in June 1993, Deputy Assistant Chief in November 1999, and Assistant Chief in April 2001. He was also instrumental in rebuilding the department after 343 firefighters died as a result of the September 11 attacks, after which he was named Chief of Operations and served at this post, succeeding Daniel A. Nigro until 2006. He was appointed Chief of Department, the highest uniformed position in the department, succeeding Peter E. Hayden in 2006, and his appointment as Fire Commissioner was announced by New York City Mayor Michael Bloomberg on December 21, 2009. In 2011, in recognition of his service to the city of New York, he received the Ellis Island Medal of Honor. He was retained by new Mayor Bill De Blasio on what he emphasized was on an interim basis.

Mr. Cassano serves as Senior Advisor to the law firm of Pitta & Baione LLP, who assist with 9/11 compensation fund claims. Mr. Cassano advises on proof of presence at Ground Zero and community outreach.

== Personal ==
Cassano and his wife, Theresa (née Wallace), live in the Huguenot section of Staten Island, where they raised their family. They have five children and eight grandchildren. A marathon runner, he has run the New York City Marathon four times and has broken the three-hour mark. Cassano practices the Transcendental Meditation technique and recommends it as a stress management tool for first responders and firefighters who deal with crisis and trauma, "going from 0-100 every single day."

Fire appointments
Preceded by Nicholas Scoppetta	FDNY Commissioner; 2010–2014	Succeeded by Daniel A. Nigro
Preceded by Peter E. Hayden	FDNY Chief of Department; 2006–2010	Succeeded by Edward S. Kilduff
Preceded by Daniel A. Nigro	FDNY Chief of Operations; 2001–2006	Succeeded by Patrick M. McNally
