= John Christopher Hartwick =

American Lutheran minister (1714–1796)

John Christopher Hartwick (January 6, 1714 – July 17, 1796) was an American Lutheran minister in Colonial America and founder of Hartwick College.

== Background ==
Hartwick was a native of the dukedom of Saxe-Gotha in the province of Thuringia in Germany and studied at the University of Halle. He was educated in the Lutheran Pietism movement. He was ordained a Lutheran Minister in the German Trinity Church of London on November 24, 1745.

Inspired to perform missionary work in the North American Colonies, Hartwick emigrated in 1746 to serve as a missionary to the German settlers in and around Rhinebeck in New York’s Hudson Valley.

He was an eccentric idealist and intolerant of parishioner's vices, requiring them to sign a promise that they would "forswear shooting, horse-racing, boozing, and dancing." He was forcefully removed from his first parish by fellow ministers of the area, and in his preaching career until 1691 moved around the northern colonies, looking to find congregations that matched his pious instructions.

In 1764 Hartwick wrote an article condemning the death penalty for theft as contrary to divine law.

== New Jerusalem ==
Hartwick felt that allowing common persons to own land and live far from one another was the cause of their immorality. He envisioned a utopian community dedicated to the principles of pious living. Having little money to start, he made a series of land deals that helped to grow wealth and finance his ventures. Purchasing land required payment to the Indians, obtaining license, various land surveys, identifying partnerships and co-petitioners, and paying quit-rent and taxes to the Crown.

In April 1761, Hartwick obtained a nearly 22,000 acres (89 km^{2}) land patent called 'the Hartwick Patent' in Otsego County, New York, located southwest of what would become Cooperstown. This patent was granted by the Colony of New York, and required payment for title to the Mohawk Indians. The attempts toward a permanent settlement on the site was made in waves thereafter, although Hartwick has trouble attracting settlers in the first years of the patent.

In following years, a 100,000 acre patent of land to the north of the Hartwick Patent was secured, and in 1785 Judge William Cooper came to survey land tracts in a portioned land tract called the Cooper-Craig Patent, neighboring immediately to the north. Hartwick continued to struggle to attract settlers to his patent in 1788 and 1789 attempts, and did not survey his land for the required 11 divisions until 1791 as required by the patent documents.

Seeking assistance in settlement of his tract, Hartwick thereafter commissioned this neighboring landowner Cooper to lease Hartwick Patent land to suitable Christian settlers for the establishment of this "New Jerusalem." Cooper essentially ignored Hartwick's criteria, and leased the property indiscriminately; most (if not all) of his tenants had little interest in Hartwick's utopian vision for the settlement.

John Christopher Hartwick's 8/11 holdings of the Hartwick Patent would form the basis for the community of Hartwick, New York.

John Christopher Hartwick died during 1796 at Clermont Manor, the home of Robert R. Livingston.

== Hartwick Seminary ==
Hartwick's vision of a seminary was as a place to provide religious instruction to the native indians He believed there should be government-run educational schools to replace the exclusive private schools of the day.

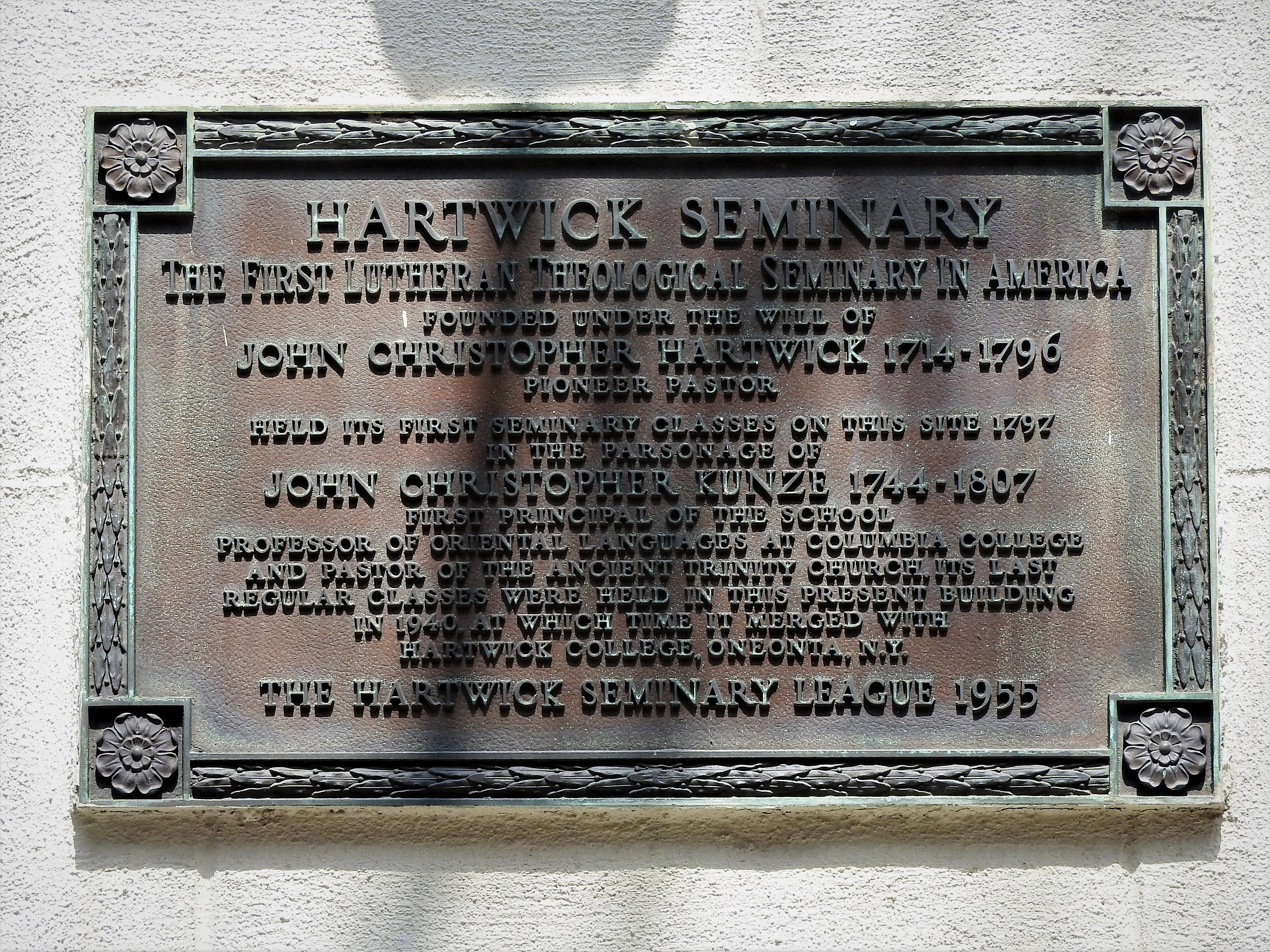
Plaque commemorating Hartwick Seminary

Hartwick had benefited financially from Cooper's indiscriminate leasing deals and left instructions in his will for the founding of a public seminary. However he made the task difficult by designating Jesus Christ as his heir. The seminary did not open until 15 years after his death.

Hartwick's choice as director of the seminary had been Dr. John Christopher Kunze a leading Lutheran theologian. Prominent political and religious leaders Jeremiah Van Rensselaer and Frederick Muhlenberg convinced Dr. Kunze to direct the seminary and teach theology at his home in New York City. Also benefiting from Hartwick's endowments were Rev. Anthony Braun who taught sciences and languages in Albany and Rev. John Frederick Ernst who taught elementary school on the Hartwick land patent.

The school first known as the Hartwick Seminary, eventually became Hartwick College. During the 1920s, the Trustees of Hartwick Seminary voted to close the seminary and use the funds to open a new college in the nearby city of Oneonta, New York.
