= Nicholas Scoppetta =

New York City fire commissioner (1932–2016)

31st New York City Fire Commissioner
- In office January 1, 2002 – December 31, 2009
- Mayor: Michael Bloomberg
- Preceded by: Thomas Von Essen
- Succeeded by: Salvatore Cassano

Personal details
- Born: November 6, 1932 Manhattan, New York City, U.S.
- Died: March 24, 2016 (aged 83) Manhattan, New York City, U.S.
- Spouse: Susan Kessell (m. 1963)
- Children: 2
- Education: Bradley University; Brooklyn Law School

Nicholas Scoppetta (November 6, 1932 – March 24, 2016) was the 31st New York City Fire Commissioner. He was appointed to that position by Mayor Michael Bloomberg on January 1, 2002 and was succeeded by Salvatore Cassano on January 1, 2010. He had previously served as the Commissioner of the city's Administration for Children's Services.

== Overview ==
As Fire Commissioner, Scoppetta headed a department with an annual budget of more than $1 billion and with more than 16,000 fire, emergency medical service, and civilian members. His extensive experience in government and management spanned more than four decades. The Fire Department of New York encompasses fire services and emergency medical services.

Scoppetta was also Commissioner of the Administration for Children's Services, where he served from 1996 through 2001. His six-year tenure was three times the average tenure of Child Welfare Administrators in New York City. During his tenure, ACS engaged in a comprehensive reform of the city's child welfare system which won praise from national child welfare experts and the media. In addition, Scoppetta was a Deputy Mayor and Commissioner of Investigation for the City of New York, an Associate Counsel to the Knapp Commission, an Assistant United States Attorney for the Southern District of New York, an Assistant District Attorney for New York County, and a Deputy Independent Counsel in the investigation and prosecution of a former Special Assistant to the President of the United States.

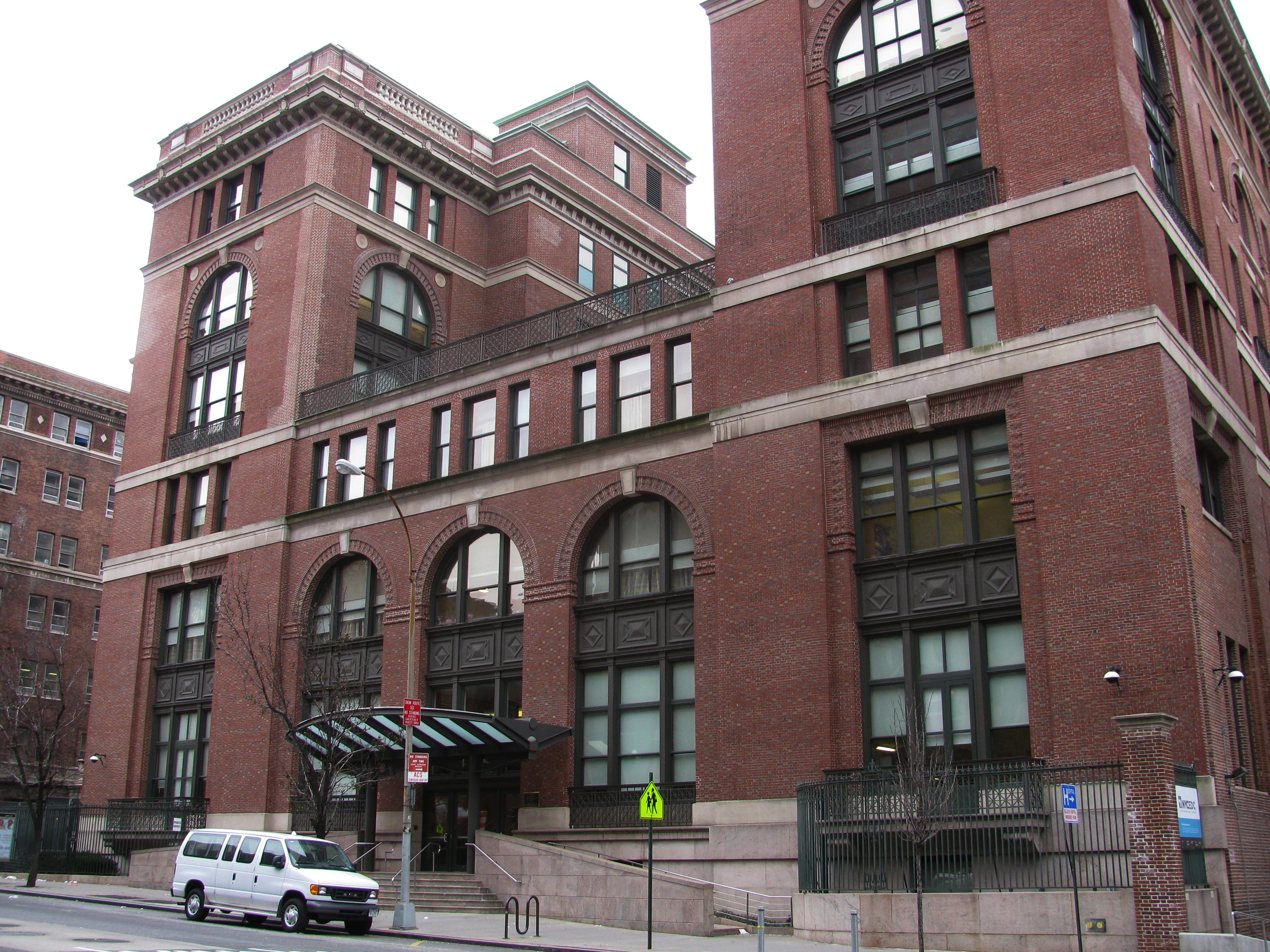
The ACS Children's Center in 2009, before it was renamed to honor Scoppetta

After a two-year battle with cancer, Scoppetta died on March 24, 2016, at a hospice of Bellevue Hospital next door to the Nicholas Scoppetta Children's Center, named in his honor in 2013.

== Childhood and education ==
Scoppetta was born on the Lower East Side of Manhattan, on November 6, 1932. He was the youngest son of Italian immigrants, who struggled to get by during the Great Depression.

By the time he was four years old, his parents turned him and his two older brothers, Tony and Vincent, over to the city's care, initially in a shelter on 104th Street. At first, the three boys were separated, he said, but they were reunited a year or so later by a chance encounter at the dentist's office, where his brother Tony recognized him. Together, he and his brothers ended up in a group home in The Bronx called Woodycrest, now an AIDS hospice. They stayed until he was 12 and they were reunited with their parents.

Scoppetta attended public schools in Manhattan, including Seward Park High School, from where he graduated in 1950.

After serving two years in the Army, he attended Bradley University on the G.I. Bill and graduated in 1958 with a degree in Civil Engineering. While at Bradley, he joined Sigma Chi fraternity.

In 1959 he was awarded a New York State Regents Scholarship and attended Brooklyn Law School at night while working in the criminal courts during the day assisting in the investigation and prosecution of cases in which children had been abused or neglected. He graduated from law school in 1962.

== Career in federal and city government ==
Shortly after he was admitted to the bar in New York City in 1962, he was appointed an Assistant District Attorney in New York County by District Attorney Frank Hogan. He served as an Assistant District Attorney in the Manhattan D.A.'s Office until 1969, when he became an Assistant United States Attorney for the Southern District of New York.

In 1971, he served as Associate Counsel to the Knapp Commission, which investigated corruption in the New York City Police Department.

In 1972, he served for a brief time as Deputy Independent Counsel in the investigation and prosecution of a former Special Assistant to President Richard Nixon.

On December 1, 1972, Scoppetta was appointed Commissioner of Investigation for the City of New York by Mayor John Lindsay, and was re-appointed to that position by Mayor Abraham Beame in 1974.

On August 1, 1974, Scoppetta was accused by New York City Comptroller Harrison J. Goldin of "instructing" a civil servant in the Comptroller's office to make entries in the Comptroller's books that were not there when his auditors looked at them. Scoppetta denounced the accusation as "outrageous", and a subsequent investigation by New York State Special Prosecutor Maurice H. Nadjari cleared Scoppetta of any wrongdoing.

On December 6, 1976, Beame named Scoppetta to the newly created post of Deputy Mayor for Criminal Justice while still remaining in his post as Commissioner of Investigation. He held both positions until he was replaced by incoming Mayor Ed Koch on January 5, 1978.

== Private practice ==
After leaving public service in 1978, Scoppetta joined the faculty of New York University School of Law where he was a Professor of Law and Director of the Institute of Judicial Administration.

In 1979, New York Governor Hugh Carey appointed Scoppetta to a post on the Waterfront Commission of New York Harbor.

In 1980, Scoppetta and Eric A. Seiff, a long-time friend from his days at the Manhattan D.A.'s Office, founded the law firm of Scoppetta & Seiff (now known as Seiff Kretz & Abercrombie), where he engaged in the private practice of law until his full-time return to public service in 1996 as the first Commissioner of the New York City Administration for Children's Services.

From February 1995 to January 1996, he was Chairman of the five-member Commission to Combat Police Corruption, which was created by Mayor Rudy Giuliani to monitor the New York City Police Department's anti-corruption efforts.

== Return to city government ==
On January 11, 1996, Giuliani announced the creation of the Administration for Children's Services and appointed Scoppetta the agency's first commissioner. ACS was the city's first independent agency devoted entirely to services for children, with a commissioner reporting directly to the mayor.

== Not-for-profit/non-profit advisory work ==
Scoppetta was a President and Chairman of the Board of Trustees of the Children's Aid Society, a not-for-profit social service agency which annually serves nearly 50,000 needy children and their families in New York City. He was a member of that Board for sixteen years.

He served on numerous boards of other not-for-profit institutions and was a member of the Executive Committee of the Association of the Bar of the City of New York. Among the nonprofits he worked closely with was the New York Blood Center, where he served as a board member from 2006 to 2015.

He was also president of New Yorkers For Children, and organization which he founded in 1996 as the non-profit partner to the Administration for Children's Services.

== Awards and professional recognition ==
On January 14, 1997, Scoppetta was awarded the Hogan-Morgenthau Award of the Hogan-Morgenthau Associates, an organization of past and present assistant district attorneys on the staffs of the Manhattan District Attorneys Frank Hogan and Robert M. Morgenthau.

== Family life ==
Scoppetta lived his entire life in Manhattan with his wife Susan, a psychotherapist; they had two children.

Preceded by Thomas Von Essen	New York City Fire Commissioner; January 1, 2002 – December 31, 2009	Succeeded by Salvatore Cassano
