= John Christopher Kunze =

American minister (1744–1807)

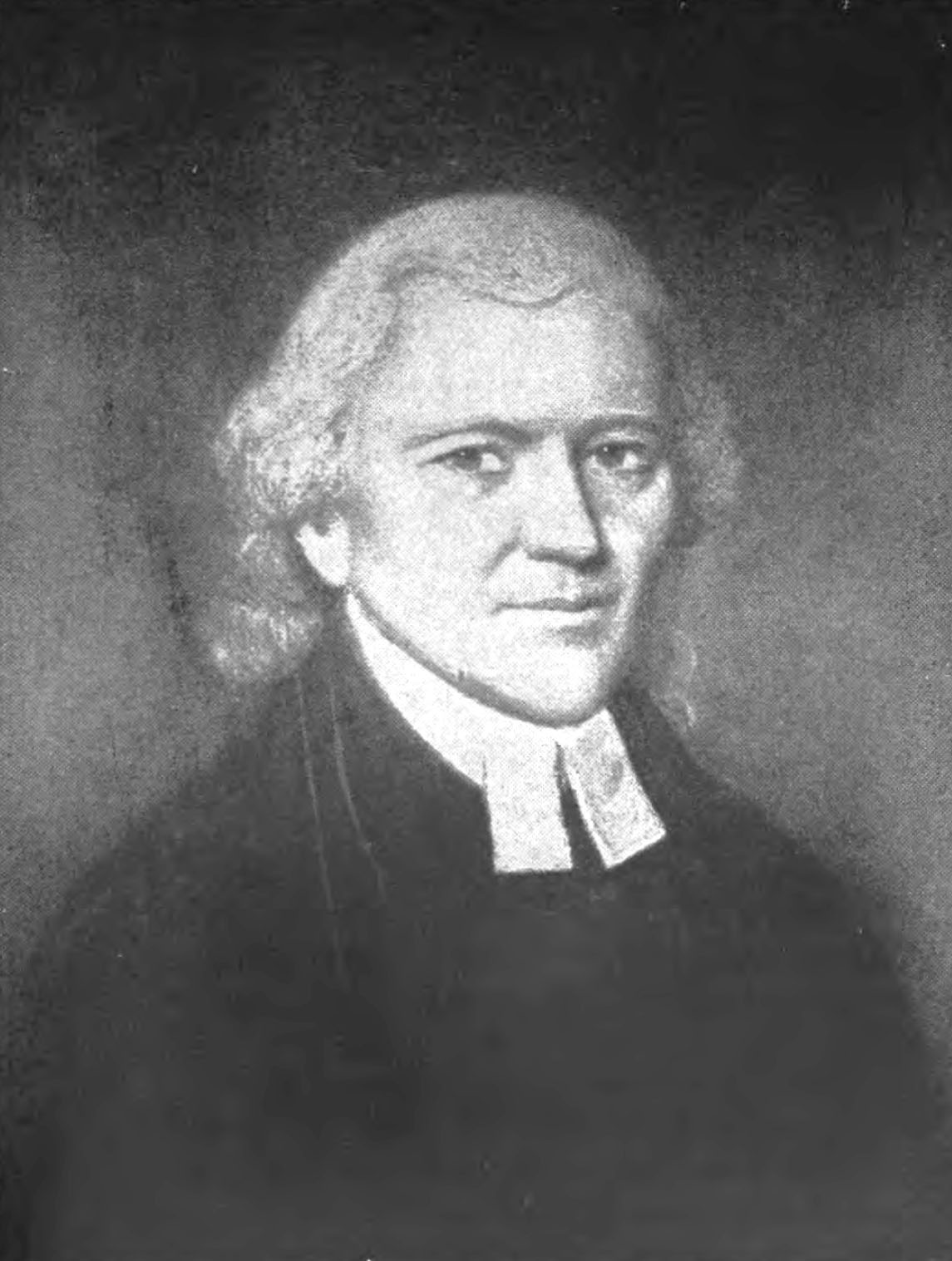

John Christopher Kunze (August 4, 1744 – July 24, 1807) was an American Lutheran minister, educator, author and theologian.

== Life ==
Kunze was born in Artern, a town in the Kyffhäuserkreis district of the Electorate of Saxony, to Jahn Godfried Kunze, a farmer and innkeeper. In 1758, when his parents died, Kunze began studying at the orphanage in Halle, Germany. He received his classical training in the gymnasia at Rossleben and Merseburg, and then attended the University of Leipzig where he studied history, philosophy and theology. He worked as a teacher and an orphanage inspector before becoming ordained as a Lutheran minister.

In 1770, Kunze emigrated to Colonial America to serve as second pastor at St. Michael's and Zion Lutheran churches in Philadelphia. In 1771, he married Margaretta Henrietta (1751–1831), daughter of Rev. Henry Muhlenberg . Kunze was an active and passionate educator and was a strong advocate for teaching the English language to his fellow German immigrants and Lutheran pastors. As a part of this mission, Kunze began a pre-theological school in Philadelphia in 1773.

In 1779, he succeeded Muhlenberg as pastor of Zion Lutheran Church, becoming the senior Lutheran minister in Philadelphia and an ex officio member of the board of trustees of the University of Pennsylvania. In 1780, he stepped down from the board to become the professor of German and Hebrew languages.

At the university, he and a fellow German Lutheran pastor, Justus Henry Christian Helmuth, tried unsuccessfully to establish a German language college within the university. While at the university, Kunze set foundations for what later developed into the field of "Semitics", including the study of Hebrew and Arabic. The university conferred the Master of Arts degree on him in 1780, and the Doctor of Divinity degree in 1783.

In 1784, Kunze accepted a position at Trinity and Christ Church, a newly formed congregation in New York City, and also became Professor of Oriental Languages at Columbia College. That same year, he was elected a member of the American Philosophical Society. In 1785, Kunze served as an official translator for the United States Congress. Kunze was fluent in five languages and had also studied medicine, astronomy, and numismatics.

In 1795, he published Hymn and Prayer Book, for the Use of such Lutheran Churches as use the English Language, the first Lutheran hymn book in the English language. He also translated Luther's Small Catechism into English.

With the death of John Christopher Hartwick in 1796, Kunze became the founding director of Hartwick Seminary. As a steward of Hartwick's estate, Kunze worked to establish a Lutheran seminary in America. Kunze had been Hartwick's personal choice as director of the seminary. Prominent political and religious leaders Jeremiah Van Rensselaer and Frederick Muhlenberg convinced Kunze to direct the seminary and teach theology at his home in New York City. In 1816, the New York State Legislature incorporated the new school—the first Lutheran seminary in America—as a classical academy and theological seminary, in the town of Hartwick, New York.

In addition to his work as an educator, Kunze had a talent for bringing people together by creating scholarly and cultural organizations. Kunze helped create the Society for Useful Knowledge and he founded the German Society of New York with Baron Friedrich von Steuben. He also helped form the Ministerium of New York, an organization of local Lutheran ministers, and served as its president until his death on July 24, 1807. He is buried at the Evergreens Cemetery in Brooklyn, New York.

== Bibliography ==
- Einige Gedichte und Lieder (1778)
- Ein Wort für den Verstand und das Herz vom Rechten und Gebanten Lebenswege (1781)
- Von den Absichten und dem bisherigen Fortgang der privilegirten Deutschen Gesellschaft zu Philadelphia in Pennsylvanien (1782)
- Hymn and Prayer Book: For the use of such Lutheran Churches as use the English Language (Publisher: Hurtin and Commardinger, 1795)
- Catechism and Liturgy (1795)
- Six Sermons (with Lawrence Van Buskirk, Publisher: T. Kirk, 112, Chatham-Street. 1797)
- King Solomon's Great Sacrifice at the Dedication of His Temple( Publisher: L. Nichols & Co., 1801)

== See also ==
- Education in Pennsylvania
- Pennsylvania Dutch

== Other sources ==
- Hess, Stephen America's Political Dynasties (Transaction Publishers. 1997)
- Lagerquist, L. DeAne The Lutherans (Praeger Paperback; 2nd edition. 1999)
