= New Yorkers For Children =

Organization

- Founded: 1996
- Founder: Nicholas Scoppetta
- Type: NGO
- Location: 450 Seventh Avenue, Suite 1707, New York, NY 10123
- Origins: New York
- Region served: New York
- Key people: Alan Yu (Executive Director); Denise Maybank (Co-President); Susan L. Burden, MSW (Co-President); Louis Klein, (Treasurer); Susan Gilroy (Secretary)
- Website: newyorkersforchildren.org

New Yorkers For Children (NYFC) is a not-for-profit organization which helps people who have aged out of the foster care system. Founded in 1996 by Nicholas Scoppetta in Manhattan, New York, the organization focuses on the academic success of foster children. NYFC's goal is to help all the youths in the foster care system to succeed academically and with equal opportunity in the workforce. With their partner Administration for Children's Services (ACS), NYFC is able to provide school supplies, access to academic counselling, job opportunities, and access to schools, as well as financial support to keep them in school.

Since its founding, New Yorkers For Children has raised and donated over $55M to its programs and scholarships with its partnership with ACS.

== Background ==
Nicholas Scoppetta founded NYFC after he was recruited by New York Mayor Rudolph W. Giuliani to run the newly formed children service agency. Scopetta was successful in getting more children adopted out of the system, reducing caseloads, as well as hiring more employees. With these achievements, Scoppetta formed NYFC and was the President of Board of Directors until his retirement in 2013, when he was replaced by Eric Brettschneider.

== Projects ==
Programs and projects of the organization include a "Back to School Package Program" aimed at supplying people from the foster system with supplies necessary for completion of a bachelor's degree; the Nicholas Scopetta Scholarship Program providing financial, emotional, and academic support to students; the Charles Evans Emergency Educational Fund for people leaving the foster care system and to support them to be able to complete their education; the Spirit Award, given to a student from the foster care system who is succeeding in college as well as demonstrating leadership, commitment to the community and determination; "Wrap to Rap", a holiday event where board members, friends of the NYFC, and teens of the community join to wrap Christmas presents, the gifts going to children in foster care; and the Youth Advisory Board (YAB), which promotes social change in how the social system supports foster children once they are too old for foster care.

== Funding ==
New Yorkers For Children makes most of its revenues from foundation and business organizations contributions. In 2016 alone the organization made $3.2 million in foundation and business organizations contributions. NYFC's special events bring in the second largest amount of revenue. From 2012 to 2016, NYFC's events brought in an average of $2.1 million. Each event honours a few of the children receiving aid from the foundation and supplies them with proper clothing attire for the night. The events are also each sponsored by a big brand or corporation, for example, Chloé and by Circa in 2010. In 2015 the Spring Dinner Dance was presented by Saks Fifth Avenue, the Fool's Fete of 2012 was sponsored by CD Greene. Each of these big-name sponsors brings in different crowds of people to the events and increases and diversifies the organizations base of donors.

Fundraising efforts include the New Yorkers For Children Annual Fall Gala, and the New Yorkers For Children Spring Dinner Dance. In 2015 the event was publicized not only for its philanthropic work but also because it honoured the fashion legend Oscar de la Renta giving the event an edge in the media. More attention is brought to the event due to the attendance of well-known people like actress Emma Roberts as well as royalty of a Saudi Prince in 2013.

== Public Support ==
New Yorkers For Children receives support from public figures. In 2009, Anderson Cooper, anchor for CNN, hosted the annual fall gala. This night included awarding Mary J. Blige the Nicholas Scoppetta Child Welfare Award for her own organization FFAWN, which empowers and supports women to go to college.

Past honourees include Secretary of State Hillary Rodham Clinton, Geoffrey Canada, Russell Simmons, and All-Pro Linebacker for the New York Giants, Keith Bulluck. This list of honourees shows the diverse background of people that participate in charitable functions.

In 2013 Hugh Jackman co-chaired the event with his wife, Deborra-Lee Furness. Jackman expressed his appreciation and support for New Yorkers For Children: "I love what New Yorkers for Children does. It's at a grass-roots level, it doesn't throw money here and there; it really looks after kids with what they need emotionally as well as financially."

== Administration for Children Services ==
Administration for Children Services (ACS), a federal agency, and New Yorkers For Children are partners. ACS Special Programs and Events promotes Safe Sleep Symposium and Child Abuse Awareness month.
