= Rashad McCrorey =

African-American entrepreneur and investor

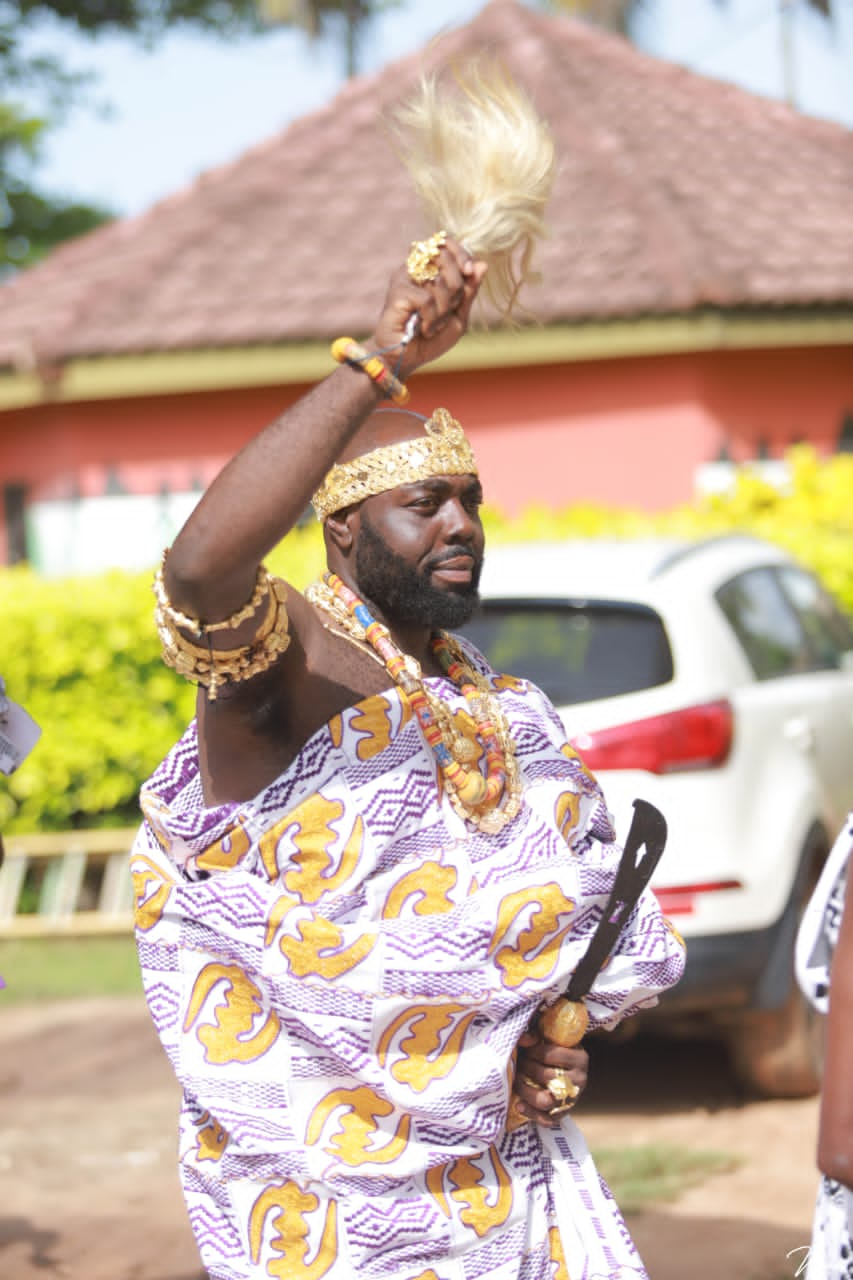
- Born: Rashad McCrorey; November 2, 1979 (age 47); Harlem, New York, United States
- Education: Dowling College (BSs); Baruch University (MPA); Drew University (MTheol)
- Occupation: Investor
- Known for: Tourism chief of Iture, Elmina

Rashad McCrorey (born November 2, 1979) also known as Nana Kofi Kukudurfo I, is an African-American entrepreneur and investor. He currently serves as the tourism chief of Iture, a sub-town of Elmina in the Central Region of Ghana.

== Early life and education ==
McCrorey has lived in Ghana since February 2020. He holds a bachelor's degree in sociology/anthropology from Dowling College, Manhattan, New York; a master's degree in public administration from CUNY Baruch University, New York; and a master's degree in theology from Drew University, New Jersey.

== Personal life ==
Rashad McCrorey was born in Harlem, New York. He currently lives in Ghana.

== Career ==
McCrorey is the owner of Africa Cross-Culture, a tourism company which specializes in organizing trips to African countries such as Egypt, Ghana, Kenya, Nigeria, Rwanda, and Uganda. He is an author known for the publications "Stuck in Africa" and "The 10 Repatriation Commandments". Additionally, he works as a journalist for ModernGhana, an online media portal.

Rashad McCrorey is recognized as an American authority figure on travel and repatriation to Africa.
