= Nathan Leventhal =

Government executive, arts administrator, corporate director

Nathan Leventhal is an American municipal government executive, arts administrator and corporate director. He served five years as Deputy Mayor of New York City and 17 years as President of Lincoln Center for the Performing Arts, which was the longest such tenure in the Center's history.

During Leventhal's career, he served at the highest levels for four New York City mayors, as City Hall chief of staff for Mayor John V. Lindsay, deputy mayor for Ed Koch and transition chairman for both mayors David Dinkins and Michael Bloomberg. At Lincoln Center, he oversaw a major expansion of Lincoln Center programming, creation of two additional Lincoln Center constituent organizations, construction of the first new campus building since the center was created and laying the foundation for Lincoln Center's, $1.2 billion redevelopment program.

== Early life ==
Leventhal was born in New York City. He grew up in Brooklyn before moving to Forest Hills, Queens at the age of ten. His father worked as a sales executive, who according to Leventhal was an exceedingly hard worker. His mother was a homemaker during Leventhal's youth. During his teenage years, she died of cancer while he was a high school senior.

He was fond of music from a young age, took piano lessons and taught himself to play the guitar. Leventhal recited in an interview he didn't enjoy his piano lessons as he felt they were very formal. Years later, Leventhal would revive his love for the piano, playing mainly in private. Despite a love for music, Leventhal initially pursued an education in the sciences. He attended Cornell University for a year, before deciding to go down a different educational path. Returning to New York City, he studied locally at Queens College, where he received a BA in public affairs; following graduation, Leventhal received a law degree from Columbia Law School, where he was Editor in Chief of the Columbia Law Review.

== Career ==
=== Government career ===
Leventhal's career in government began in 1967, when he worked at The Pentagon in the office of the General Counsel of the Air Force. He remained in Washington to work as an assistant to the executive director of the Equal Employment Opportunity Commission, which had recently been established by the civil rights act in 1964. In 1969, he moved back to New York City to work for the administration of Mayor John V. Lindsay as fiscal director of the human resources administration, then moving to the mayors office to become assistant to the mayor and then City Hall Chief of Staff. In 1972, Lindsay appointed Leventhal, then 29, as Commissioner of Rent and Housing Maintenance.

After serving briefly in 1973-74 as chief counsel to the US Senate subcommittee on administrative practice and procedure, chaired by Senator Edward M. Kennedy, Leventhal practiced law in New York City for four years, becoming a partner at a law firm, Poletti Frieden Prashker Feldman and Gartner before returning to city government in 1978, when newly elected Mayor Edward Koch appointed him Commissioner of Housing Preservation and Development.

In August 1979, Mayor Koch implemented a major reorganization of the City Hall staff in a move whose scope "stunned" City Hall observers and appointed Leventhal Deputy Mayor of Operations, with all city commissioners reporting to Leventhal; previously all commissioners had reported directly to Mayor Koch. As deputy mayor, Leventhal was responsible for overseeing the day-to-day operations of City government, including implementing a government-wide productivity program. Included among the productivity initiatives overseen by Leventhal was the first New York City "gain-sharing" program where, in return for reduced manning requirements, sanitation workers performing more work shared in the budgetary savings in the form of incremental pay. Leventhal also suggested to Mayor Koch that the city move to a GAAP balanced budget a year before the State law required, a move widely praised in the press and the financial community and which led to the restoration of the city's investment-grade rating. After leaving his post in 1984, to assume the position of President of Lincoln Center for the Performing Arts, Leventhal was the subject of New York Times editorial, which noted that Mayor Koch had run on the slogan "why not try competence" stating that Leventhal "supplied much of it" providing "invaluable services for his community" and "departs City Hall with its gratitude." Similar comments were also made in the New York Post, stating he performed his job with "surpassing style and skill."

=== President of Lincoln Center ===
Leventhal's hiring as president of Lincoln Center was recommended to its board by Chairman Martin E. Segal, a cultural leader of New York City over many decades. Together with Segal and his successors - George Weissman, former CEO of Philip Morris and operatic superstar Beverly Sills - Leventhal focused on overseeing a significant expansion of Lincoln Center's programming activities including the establishment of a new jazz program, hiring the then-26 year-old trumpet virtuoso Wynton Marsalis as its artistic leader, eventually culminating in the creation of a permanent constituent organization, Jazz at Lincoln Center; launched the Lincoln Center Festival, an eclectic gathering of cutting edge performances from around the world; created Lincoln Center's American Songbook series, a tribute to the golden days of American popular music; and started Midsummer Night Swing, a populist informal program of dancing open to the public on Lincoln Center's central plaza. While these initiatIves were generally well received, they occasionally elicited criticism from Lincoln Center constituents that Lincoln Center’s expansive programming was competing with their own programming and fundraising efforts. [15]. Nevertheless, during his tenure, there was also unprecedented cooperation in programming among Lincoln Center and its constituents, most evident in the Mozart Bicentennial celebration of 1991/1992, in which all constituents joined in performing all of Mozart's compositions.

Leventhal also supervised the construction of the Samuel P. and David Rose building, the first new building since Lincoln Center's creation which, among things, included the first dormitory facilities for the Juilliard School and the School of American Ballet (which had become the first new Lincoln Center constituent company since its founding); a year-round performance facility for the Film Society of Lincoln Center; and rehearsal, studio and office space for Lincoln Center and its constituent companies. Together with Chairman Beverly Sills, Leventhal launched what would become a $1.2 billion Lincoln Center redevelopment program, securing a $250 million grant from New York City to start the project. He and Sills were also instrumental in receiving New York City's commitment to have the developer of the future Time Warner Center include provisions in his plan for a new Lincoln Center performance space.

== Later career ==
In March 2000, Leventhal announced that he would be leaving his position as President of Lincoln Center by the end of the year. Leventhal admitted that he looked forward to spending more time at his home in Connecticut, playing tennis, and resuming piano lessons. However, in November 2001, the surprise winner of the 2001 New York City mayoral election, Michael Bloomberg, asked Leventhal to chair his transition committee, as Leventhal had previously done in 1989 for former Mayor David Dinkins. Leventhal stayed on to chair Bloomberg's appointments committee for the next 12 years, recommending candidates to fill city commissionerships and deputy mayor positions. Leventhal also became active in his new home in New York State's Suffolk County, serving on a fiscal task force appointed by the county executive, as well as a member of the budget and finance committee of the town of Southampton. In April 2020, the Suffolk County Executive appointed Leventhal to a four member COVID-19 Task Force, charged with the responsibility of advising the County on the financial impact of the coronavirus pandemic and ways to ameliorate its negative effects on the County’s economy. (Robinson, Pam “Bellone Picks Fiscal Impact Task Force‘’ Huntington Now, April 16, 2020). In 2017, Leventhal became Board president of Palm Beach Opera. Since 1989 onwards, Leventhal has served as a director of equity, fixed income and money market funds managed by BNY Mellon and Dreyfus. From 2003 to 2020, Leventhal served as a Director of Movado Group Inc. where he was chairman of the nominating and corporate governance committee. Other pro bono governmental positions held by Leventhal: In 1993, New York Governor Mario Cuomo appointed Leventhal to be a member of the New York State Commission on Constitutional Revision. [Benjamin, Gerald, editor, “New York State Constitution“ March, 1994]. In 1997, Leventhal was nominated by President Clinton and confirmed by the US Senate for a five-year term on the National Council on the Arts. In 2007, Mayor Michael Bloomberg nominated and the New York City Council confirmed Leventhal's five-year term on the NY City Planning Commission.
