= Hartwick College =

Private college in Oneonta, New York, US

- Former name: Hartwick Seminary (1797–1927)
- Motto: Ad Altiora Semper "Ever Upwards"
- Type: Private college
- Established: 1797; 229 years ago
- Endowment: $43.8 million (2024)
- President: Laurel Bongiorno
- Faculty: 95 FT/ 57 PT (2023)
- Undergraduates: 1,113 (2023)
- Postgraduates: 1 (2023)
- Location: Oneonta, New York, United States; 42°27′29″N 75°04′17″W
- Campus: Main academic campus: 425 acres (1.72 km^{2}) Environmental campus: 920 acres (3.7 km^{2})
- Colors: blue and white
- Nickname: Hawks
- Sporting affiliations: Division III – Empire 8
- Mascot: Swoop
- Website: hartwick.edu

Hartwick College is a private liberal arts college in Oneonta, New York. The institution's origin is rooted in the founding of Hartwick Seminary in 1797 through the will of John Christopher Hartwick. In 1927, the seminary became a four-year college and moved from Hartwick to its Oneonta location.

== History ==
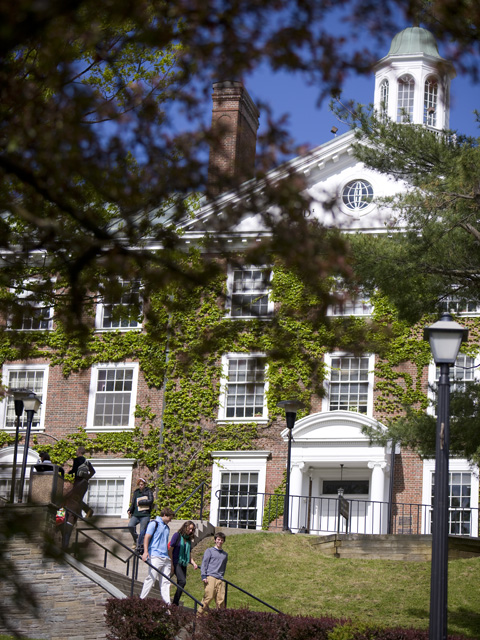
Memorial Staircase and Bresee Hall

Hartwick College traces its history to the will of Lutheran minister John Christopher Hartwick, who died in 1796. The following year, in 1797, the executors of his will decided to establish a seminary in his name. The first student graduated in 1803, and in 1816 the New York State Legislature incorporated the school—the first Lutheran seminary in America—as a classical academy and theological seminary in Hartwick, near Cooperstown. The college's ties to the Lutheran Church ended in 1968, and it has since had no religious affiliation.

The school moved to its Oneonta location in 1928, when the seminary's trustees voted to close it and incorporate there as a four-year college. The college was granted a permanent charter from the New York Board of Regents in 1931.

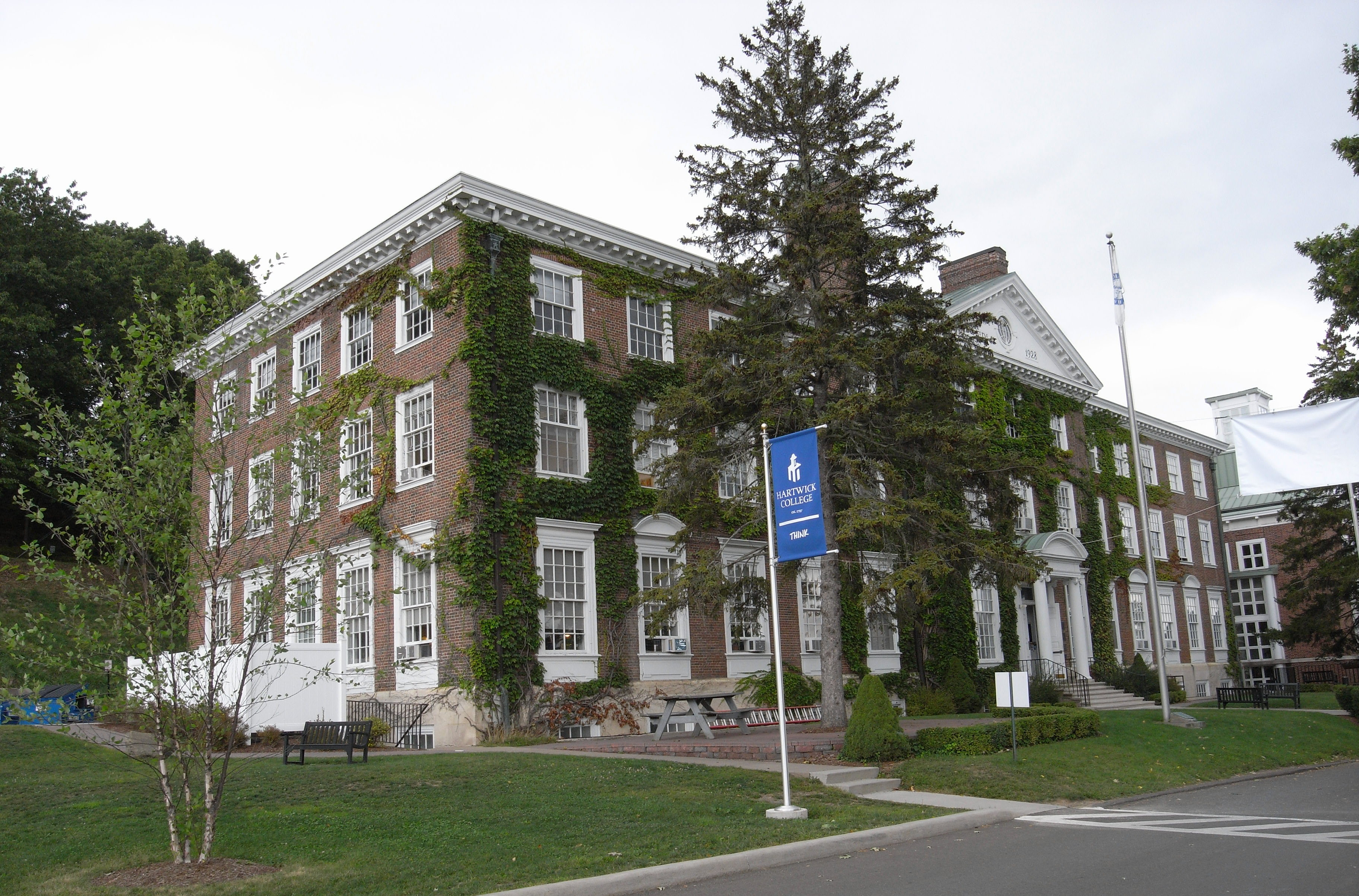
Bresee Hall

The land for the campus was donated by the City of Oneonta. Bresee Hall, the oldest building on campus, was designed by architect John Russell Pope and built in 1928. It was listed on the National Register of Historic Places in 2004.

In 2016, the college secured more than $34 million through its latest capital campaign, exceeding the original goal of $32 million.

== Academics ==
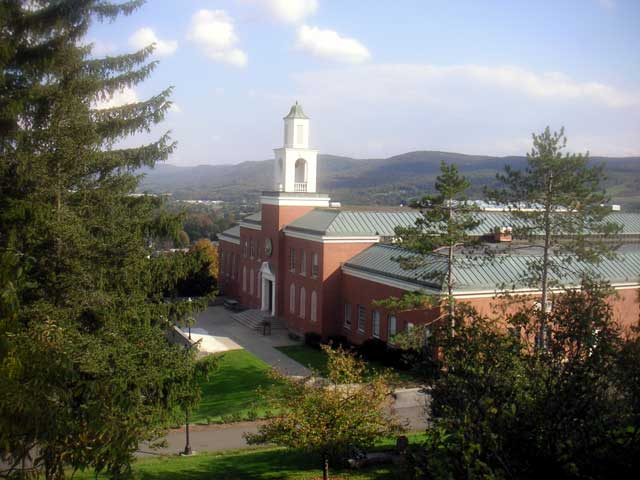
Yager Hall, the college library

Hartwick College offers 45 courses of study leading to a Bachelor of Arts or Bachelor of Science degree. Additionally, it offers 11 minors; pre-professional programs in law, medicine, engineering and allied health professions; and five cooperative programs in engineering, law, business, and physical and occupational therapy. Students can also choose a concentration within their major.

The pre-engineering program at Hartwick has cooperative agreements with both Columbia University and Clarkson University that allow students to spend three years at Hartwick and two years at one of the other schools studying engineering. Successful completion brings a bachelor's degree from Hartwick and an engineering degree from Clarkson or Columbia.

Hartwick's three-year bachelor's degree program allows qualified students to receive a degree in three years, as opposed to the traditional four. Since its launch in 2009, the program has sparked national interest for cost savings and quality.

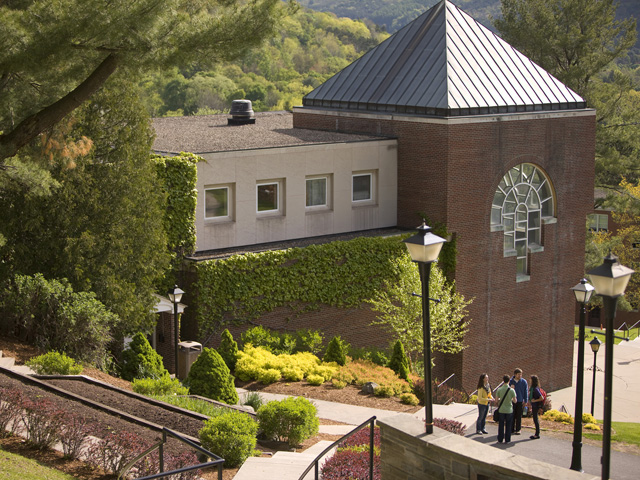
Dewar Union at Hartwick College

Hartwick College is accredited by the Middle States Commission on Higher Education. The nursing program is accredited by the Commission on Collegiate Nursing Education and the American Chemical Society approves the Bachelor of Science degree program in chemistry.

=== January term ===
Every year in January, many Hartwick students participate in international courses taught by Hartwick faculty. Nearly every off-campus program is open to new students and scholarships are available.

== Presidents ==
1. Charles Myers (1926–1929)
2. Charles W. Leitzell (1929–1939)
3. Henry Arnold (1939–1953) – first layperson to head college
4. Miller A.F. Ritchie (1953–1959)
5. Frederick M. Binder (1959–1969)
6. Adolph G. Anderson (1968–1977)
7. Philip S. Wilder, Jr. (1977–1992)
8. Richard Detweiler (1992–2003)
9. Richard P. Miller, Jr. (2003–2008)
10. Margaret L. Drugovich (2008–2022)
11. Darren Reisberg (2022–2023)
12. James H. Mullen, Jr. (2023–2026)
13. Laurel Bongiorno (2026–present)

== Rankings ==
Academic rankings

Liberal arts
- U.S. News & World Report: 142
- Washington Monthly: 90

National
- Forbes: 579
- WSJ/College Pulse: 359

In 2021, U.S. News & World Report ranked Hartwick College 146th out of 223 schools in its National Liberal Arts College Rankings. In 2013, U.S. News & World Report also ranked Hartwick 21st among all U.S. colleges and universities for the percentage of students who study abroad.

In Washington Monthly’s 2019 College Rankings, Hartwick is ranked No. 130 out of 214 liberal arts colleges in the nation.

== Student life ==
Hartwick offers student-run activities through more than 60 clubs and organizations that cover a wide variety of topics. There are several fraternities and sororities on campus.

The campus weekly newspaper is called Hilltops. Hartwick also operates a student-run radio station, WRHO 89.7 FM.

=== Pine Lake Environmental Campus ===
Hartwick College acquired the Pine Lake Environmental Campus in 1971. Pine Lake provides Hartwick students with opportunities for hands-on research, academic study, and responsible environmental stewardship and self-discovery. It offers a residential alternative to the main campus residence halls. The campus has 11 buildings on over 300 preserved acres, including eight cabins that are used as student housing during the school year.

=== Table Rock Trail System ===
Hartwick College's main campus features an extensive trail system spanning approximately ten miles, open to students, college employees, and the public. Managed by the Hartwick Trails Committee, these trails offer opportunities for hiking and mountain biking. Students have the opportunity to engage in hiking and wellness courses that utilize the trail system. Additionally, they can design research projects that are based on the trail system, and earn service hours by assisting with trail maintenance. The trails serve as a platform for sustainability initiatives and provide a valuable resource for outdoor recreation and education at Hartwick College.

== Athletics ==
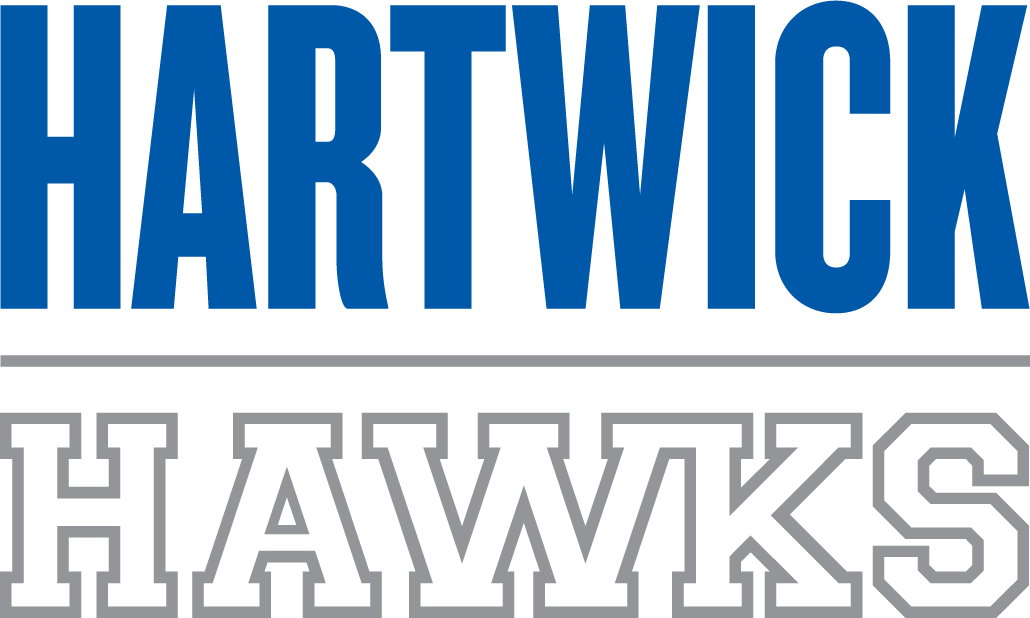
Hartwick athletics logo

Hartwick's mascot is Swoop the Hawk. The school's colors are Wellesley Blue and White.

The college is a member of the National Collegiate Athletic Association (NCAA), competing at the Division III level, and is a member of the Empire 8 Conference.

Men's volleyball and women's flag football were added as varsity sports in 2025–26.

=== Men's sports ===
- Basketball
- Cross country
- Football
- Indoor track and field
- Lacrosse
- Outdoor track and field
- Soccer
- Swimming and diving
- Volleyball

=== Women’s sports ===
- Basketball
- Cross country
- Field hockey
- Flag football
- Indoor track and field
- Lacrosse
- Outdoor track and field
- Soccer
- Softball
- Swimming and diving
- Tennis
- Volleyball

== Notable alumni ==
- Scott Adams, creator of Dilbert and author
- Isaac Newton Arnold, lawyer, politician, abolitionist. Attended Hartwick Seminary.
- Frederick H. Belden, Tenth Episcopal Bishop of Rhode Island
- John Bluem, professional soccer player, college coach, and broadcaster
- Jason Boltus, professional football player
- Mike Burns, professional soccer player
- Charles D. Cook, politician
- Peter Daempfle, author
- Maxwell Jacob Friedman, wrestler
- Stephen L. Green, businessperson
- Tyler Hemming, professional soccer player
- Matt Lawrence, professional soccer player
- David H. Long, businessperson
- Dave Lemanczyk, professional baseball player
- Clarence MacGregor, judge and politician
- Michael Maren, journalist and filmmaker
- Ian McIntyre, college soccer coach
- Cyrus Mehri, lawyer
- Glenn "Mooch" Myernick, professional soccer player and coach
- Craig Potter, professional soccer player
- John A. Quitman, politician who attended Hartwick Seminary
- Rory Read, businessperson
- Andrew Sambrook, professional soccer player
- James L. Seward, politician
- Craig Slaff, artist
- Tom Wisner, musician
- Nadya Zhexembayeva, businessperson
