= History of the New York City Police Department =

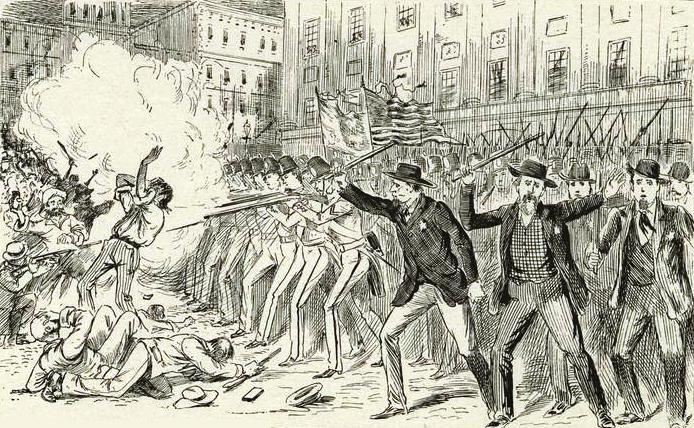
One of the first major tests of the effectiveness of the new New York City Metropolitan Police in 1845 was the Astor Place Riot of 1849. Note: The city policemen wore a badge but were not required to wear full regulation uniforms until 1854.

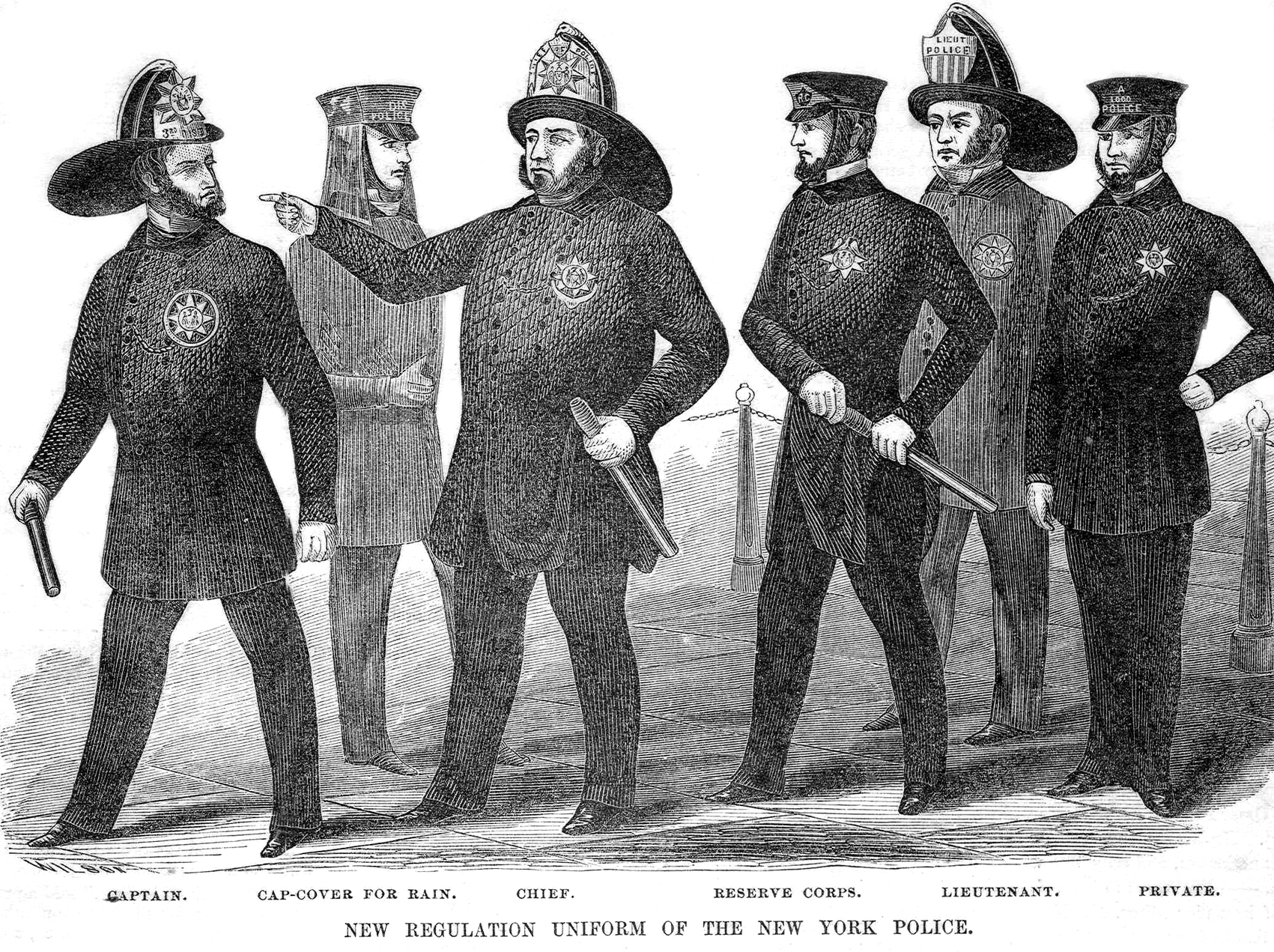
The new regulation uniforms of the Police in 1854

The New York City Police Department (NYPD) originates in the Government of New York City attempts to control rising crime in early- to mid-19th-century New York City. The City's reforms created a full-time professional police force modeled upon London's Metropolitan Police, itself only formed in 1829. Established in 1845, the Municipal Police replaced the inadequate night watch system which had been in place since the 17th century, when the city was founded by the Dutch as New Amsterdam.

In 1857, the Municipal Police were tumultuously replaced by the Metropolitan Police, which consolidated other local police departments.

Late 19th and early 20th century trends included professionalization and struggles against corruption.

== 19th century ==
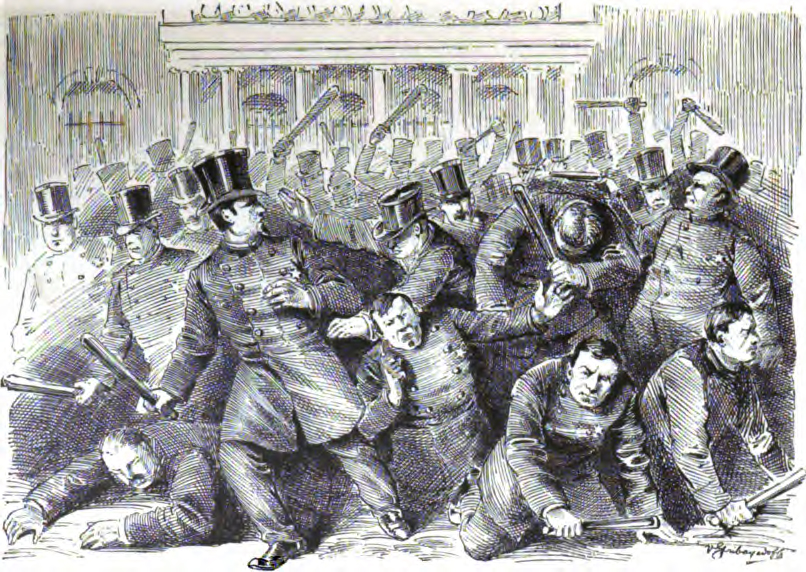
Municipal and Metropolitan policemen fight each other in front of the New York City Hall for control over the police force in the New York City Police Riot of 1857. The newly formed New York City Metropolitan Police replaced the former Municipal Police in 1857.

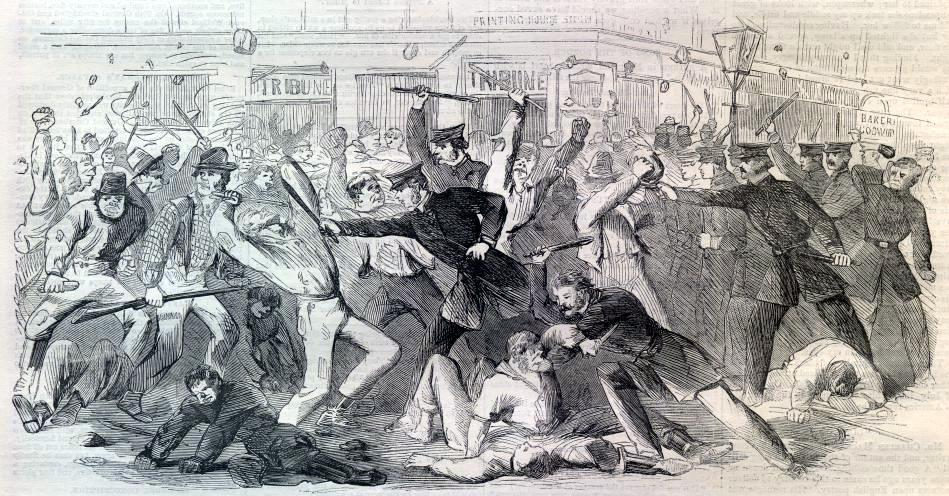
NYCPD Officers charging rioters at the offices of the New York Tribune newspaper. New York City draft riots July 1863

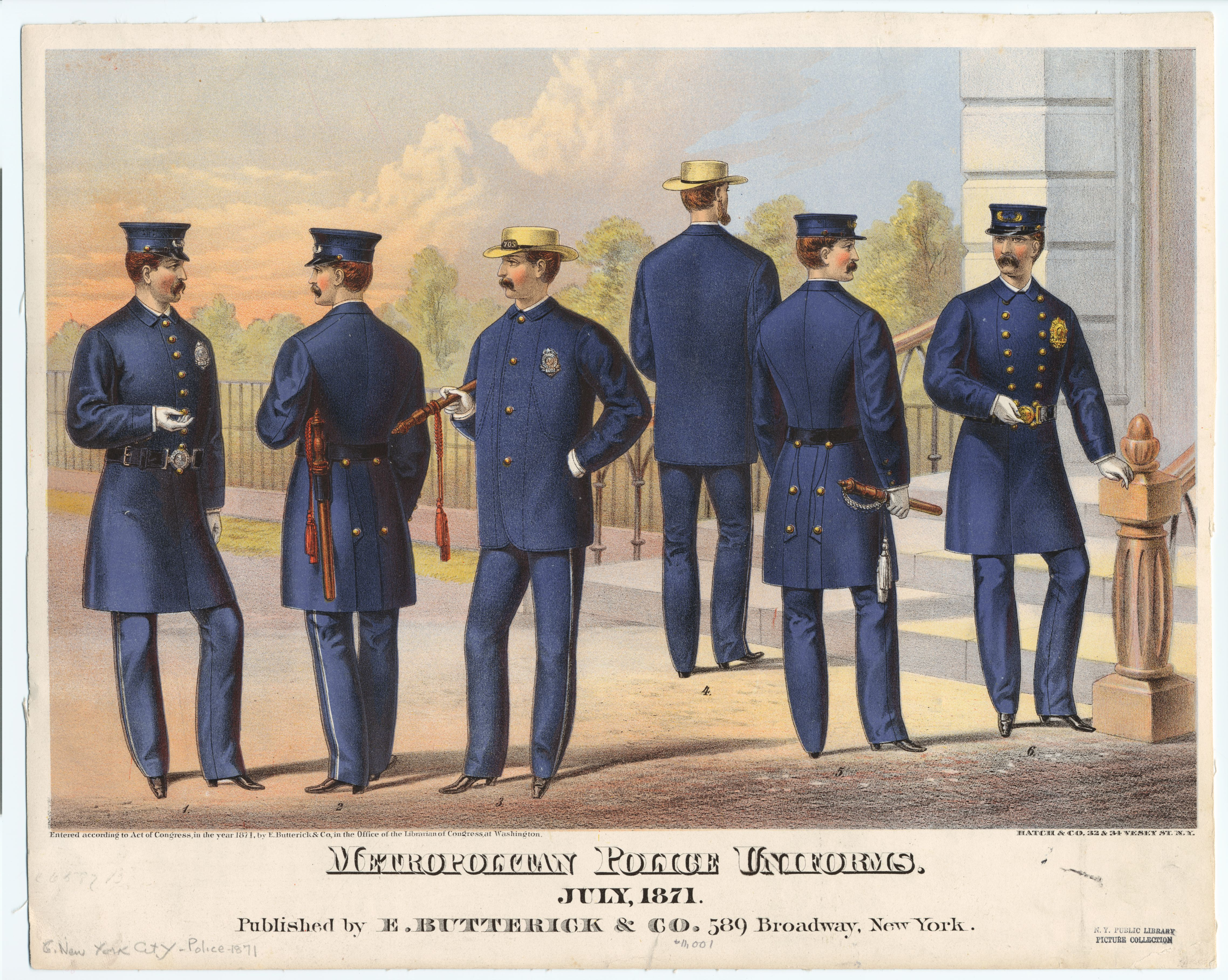
The regulation uniforms of the Metropolitan Police in 1871

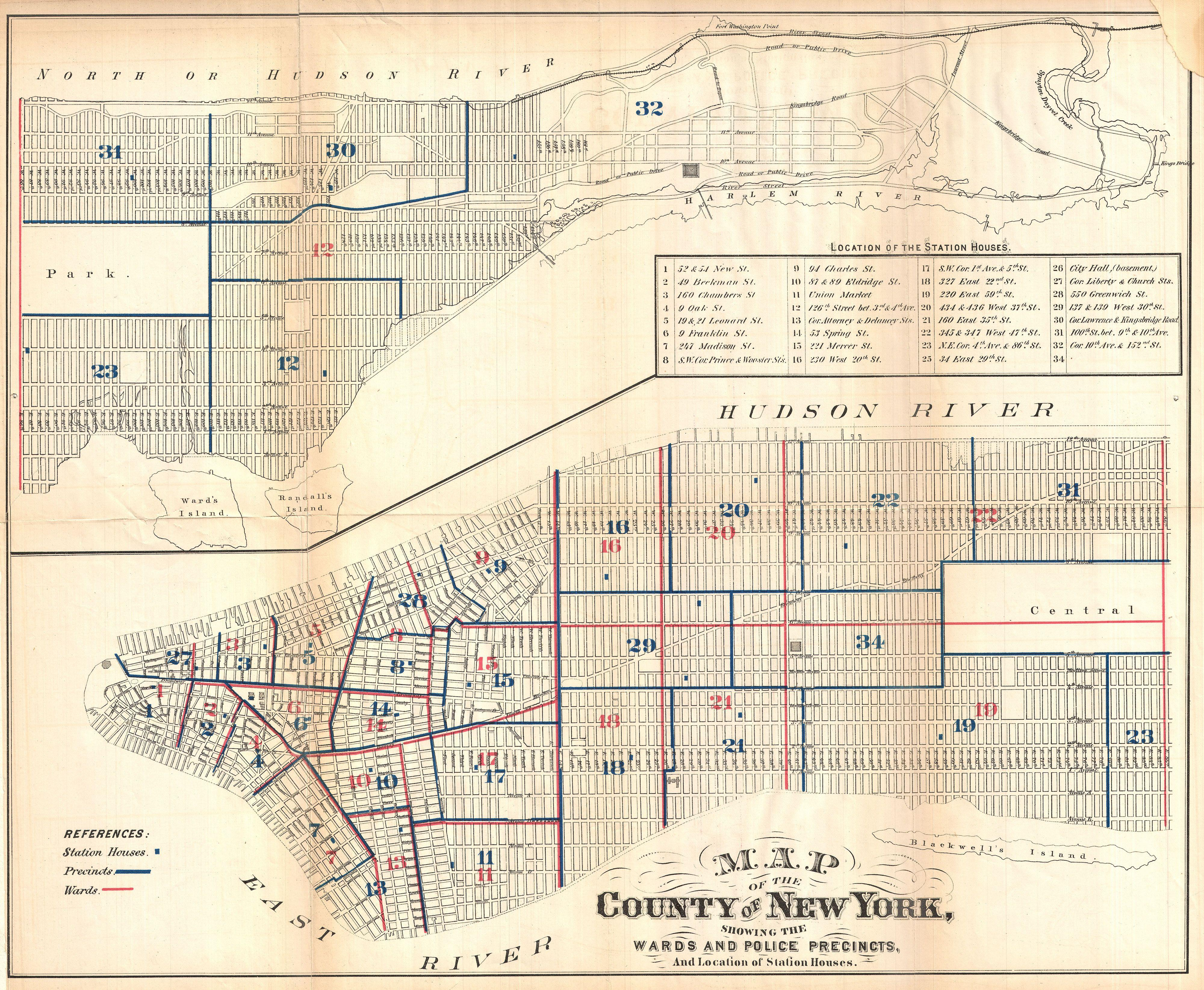
An 1871 map of wards and police precincts

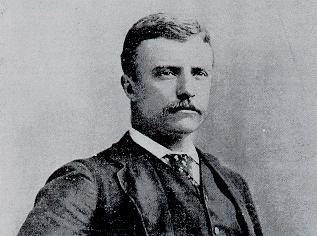
Police Commissioner Theodore Roosevelt in 1895 who tried to clean up corruption within the police department

Prior to the establishment of the NYPD, New York City's population of about 320,000 was served by a force consisting of 1 night watch, 100 city marshals, 31 constables, and 51 municipal police officers. On May 7, 1844, the New York State passed the Municipal Police Act, a law which authorized creation of a police force and abolished the night watch system. At the request of the New York City Common Council, Peter Cooper drew up a proposal to create a police force of 1,200 officers. John Watts de Peyster was an early advocate of implementing military style discipline and organization to the force.

However, because of a lengthy dispute between the Common Council and the Mayor of New York City regarding who would appoint the officers, the law was not put into effect until the following year. Under Mayor William Havemeyer, the city finally repealed their watch system and adopted the Municipal Police Act as an ordinance on May 23, 1845, creating the New York Police Department in fact rather than merely in legislative theory.

For the purposes of policing, the city was divided into three districts, with courts, magistrates, clerks, and station houses. The NYPD was closely modeled after the Metropolitan Police Service in London, England which used a military-like organizational structure, with rank and order. A navy blue uniform was introduced after long debate in 1853.

In 1857, Republican Party reformers in the New York State capital of Albany created a new Metropolitan police force and abolished the Municipal police, as part of their effort to rein in the Democratic Party–controlled New York City government. The Metropolitan Police Bill consolidated the police in New York, Brooklyn, Staten Island, and Westchester County (which then included The Bronx), under a Governor of New York-appointed board of commissioners.

Unwilling to be abolished, Mayor Fernando Wood and the Municipals resisted for several months, during which time the city effectively had two police forces, the State-controlled Metropolitans, and the Municipals. The Metropolitans included 300 policemen and seven captains who left the Municipal police but was primarily made up of raw recruits with little or no training. The Municipals were controlled directly by Wood and including 800 policemen and 15 captains who stayed. The division between the forces was ethnically determined, with immigrants largely staying with the Municipals, and those of Anglo-Dutch heritage going to the Metropolitans.

Chaos ensued. Criminals had a high old time. Arrested by one force, they were rescued by the other. Rival cops tussled over possession of station houses. The opera buffa climax came in mid-June when [a] Metropolitan police captain ... attempted to deliver a warrant for the mayor's arrest, only to be tossed out by a group of Municipals. Armed with a second warrant, a much larger force of Metropolitans marched against City Hall. Awaiting them were a massed body of Municipals, supplemented by a large crowd ... Together, the mayor's supporters began clubbing and punching the outnumbered Metropolitans away from the seat of government. ...The Metropolitans gained the day after the [State-controlled] Seventh Regiment came to its rescue, and the warrant was served on Wood. This setback for the mayor was followed by another: on July 2 the Court of Appeals ruled in favor of the state law. Wood knuckled under and disbanded the Municipals late in the afternoon of July 3, leaving the Metropolitans in possession of the field.

Unfortunately, the untested Metropolitans failed to prevent rioting in the city the next day, Independence Day (July 4), and had to be rescued by the Bowery Boys, a nativist gang, when the Irish-immigrant gang the Dead Rabbits attacked the "Mets". Barricades were erected and the battle went on for hours, the worst rioting in the city since 1849. The next Sunday, peace was maintained by the State Militia, but a week later, on July 12, German immigrants in Little Germany rioted when the Metropolitans attempted to enforce the new reform liquor laws and close down saloons. A blacksmith was killed in the skirmish, and the next day, ten thousand marched up Broadway with a banner proclaiming Opfer der Metropolitan-Polizei ("Victim of the Metropolitan Police").

Throughout the years, the NYPD has been involved with a number of riots in New York City. In July 1863, the New York State Militias were aiding Union Army troops in Pennsylvania, when the 1863 New York Draft Riots broke out. Their absence left it to the police—who were then outnumbered—to quell the riots. The Tompkins Square Riot occurred on January 13, 1874 when police crushed a demonstration involving thousands of unemployed in Tompkins Square Park.

Newspapers, including The New York Times, covered numerous cases of police brutality during the latter part of the 19th century. Cases often involved officers using clubs to beat suspects and persons who were drunk or rowdy, posed a challenge to officers' authority, or refused to move along down the street. Most cases of police brutality occurred in poor immigrant neighborhoods, including Five Points, the Lower East Side, and Tenderloin.

Beginning in the 1870s, politics and corruption of Tammany Hall, a political machine supported by Irish immigrants, infiltrated the NYPD, which was used as a political tool, with positions awarded by politicians to loyalists. Many officers and leaders in the police department took bribes from local businesses, overlooking things like illegal liquor sales. Police also served political purposes such as manning polling places, where they would turn a blind eye to ballot box stuffing and other acts of fraud.

The Lexow Committee was established in 1894 to investigate corruption in the police department. The committee made reform recommendations, including the suggestion that the police department adopt a civil service system. Corruption investigations have been a regular feature of the NYPD, including the Knapp Commission of the 1970s, and the Mollen Commission of the 1990s.

In 1895, Theodore Roosevelt became President of the NYPD Police Commission. Under his leadership, many reforms were instituted in the NYPD.

On 1 January 1898, the city expanded to include Brooklyn. The department absorbed eighteen existing police departments, requiring more modern organization and communication as it now protected 320 square miles and over three million residents.

== 20th century ==
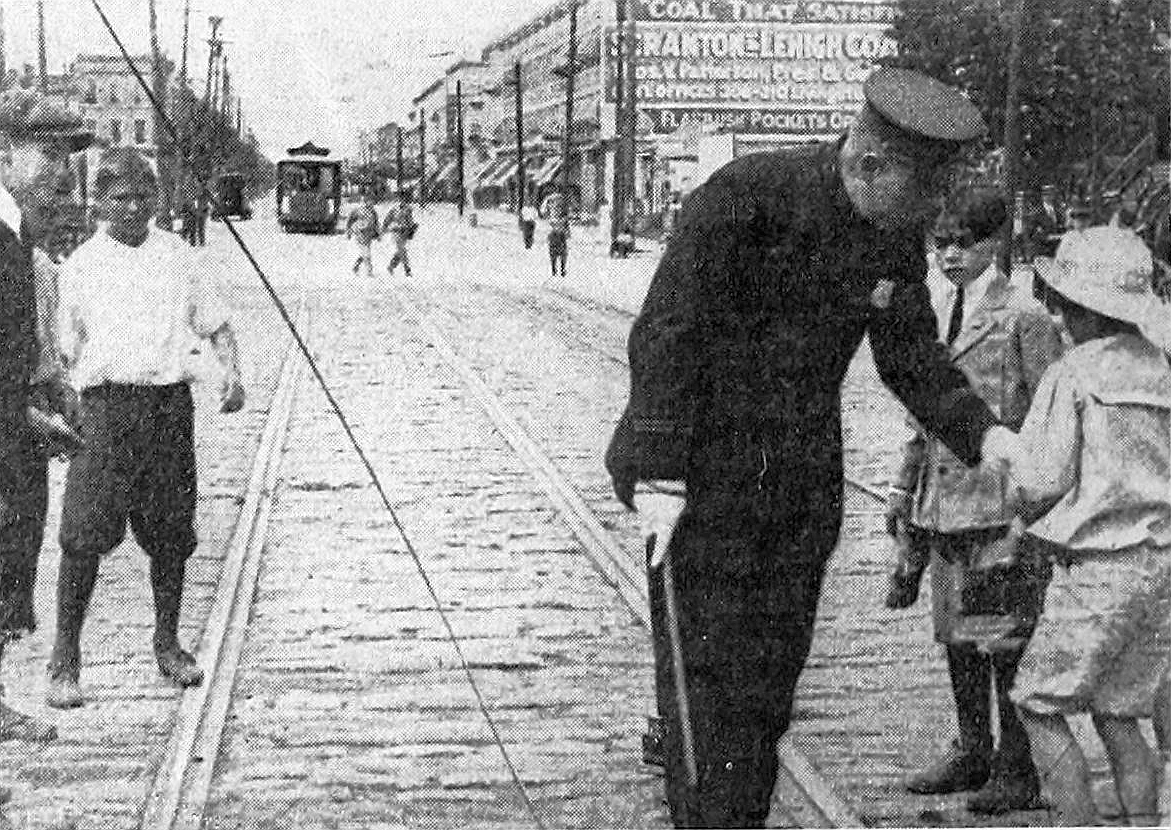
Policeman keeping children from a fallen electrical wire in Brooklyn in 1908

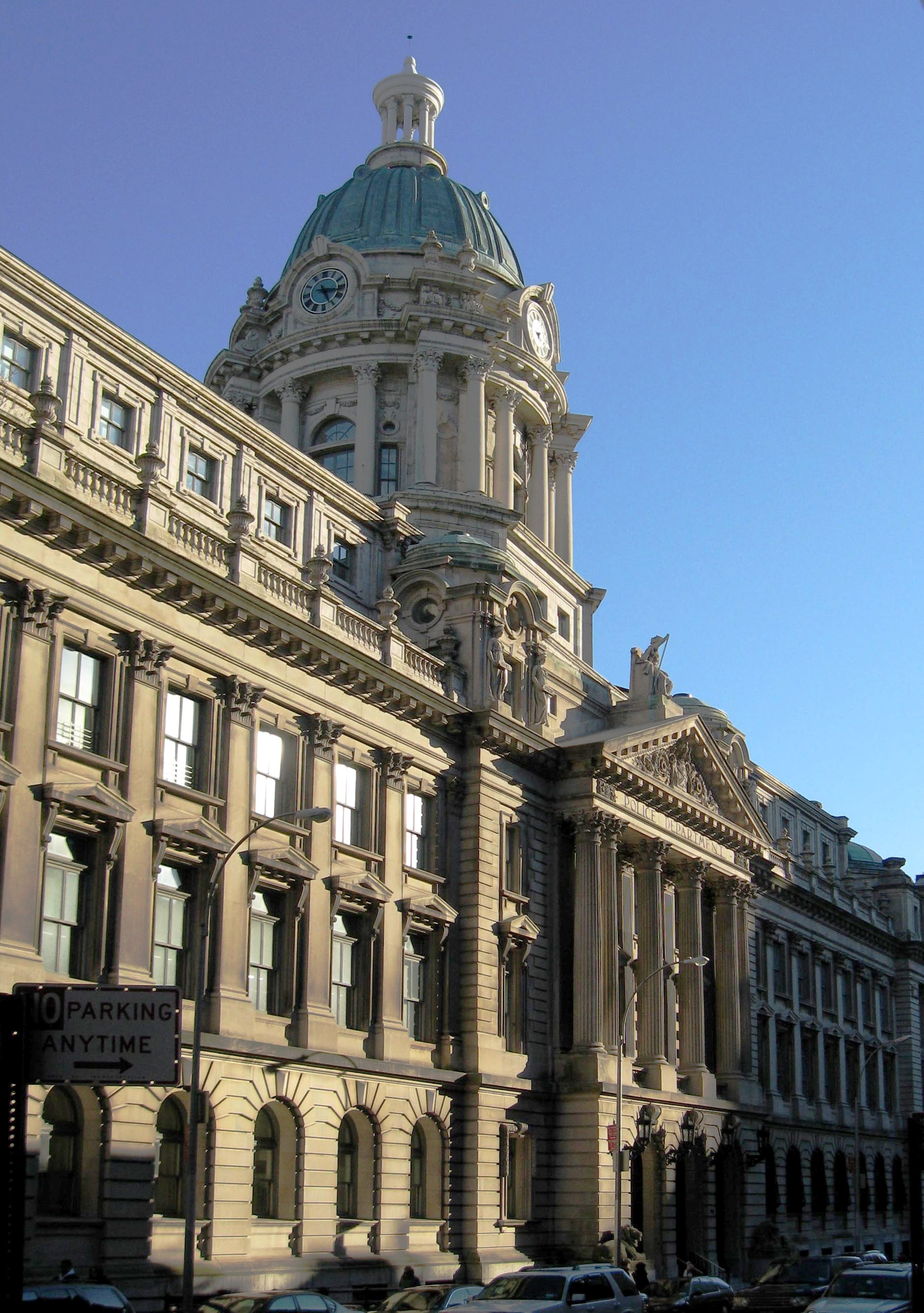
Department headquarters from 1909–73, at Centre and Broome Streets

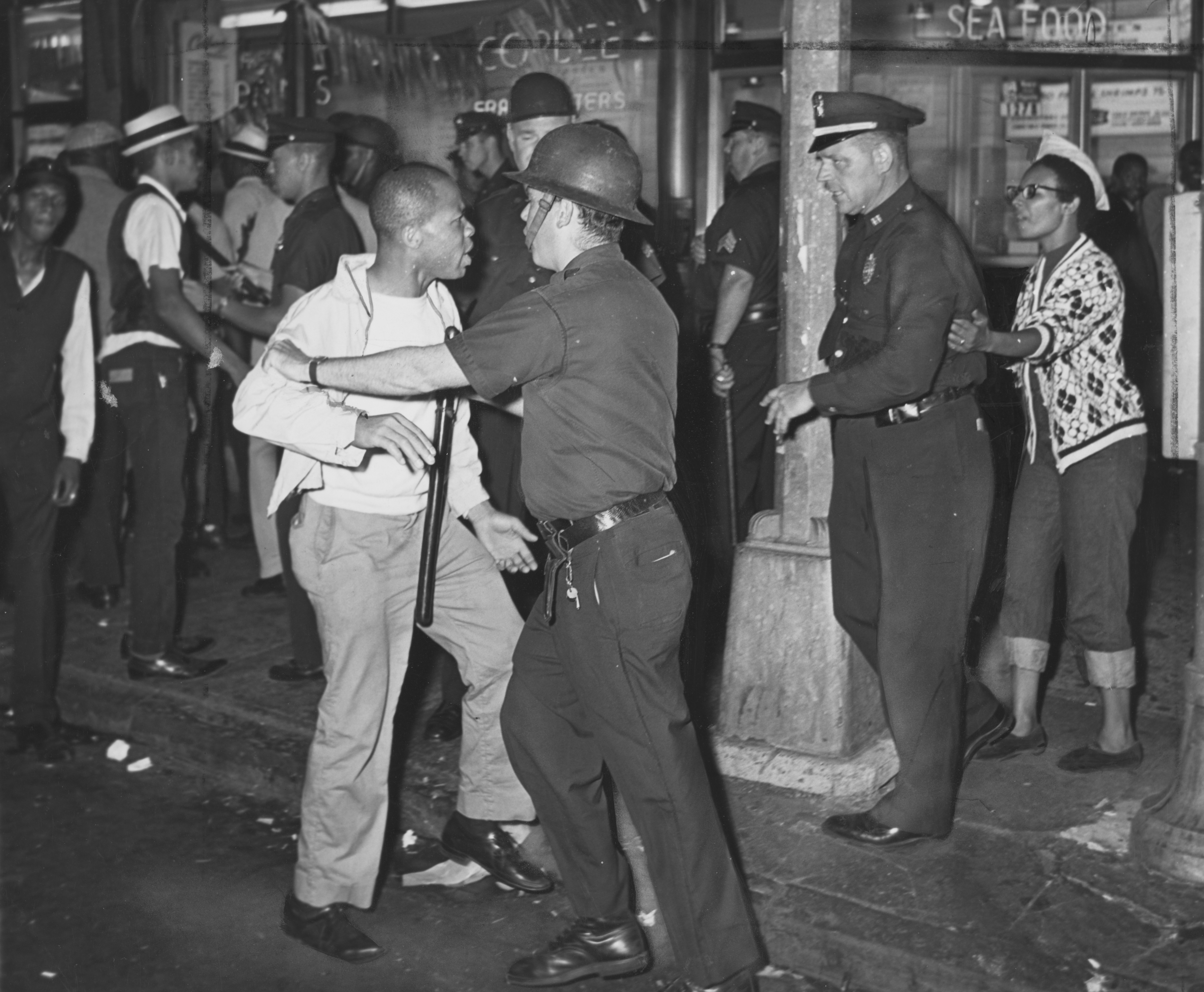
Policemen with African American protesters during the Bedford–Stuyvesant riot of 1964, an extension of the 1964 Harlem Riot

Around the turn of the century, the NYPD began to professionalize under leadership of then President of the Police Commission, Theodore Roosevelt. With innovations in science and technology, the police force were able to establish new units, such as the Bomb Squad in 1905, Motorcycle Squad in 1911, Automobile Squad in 1919, Emergency Service Unit in 1926, Aviation Unit in 1929 as well as the Radio Motor Patrol (RMP) in 1932. The department was also among the earliest to implement fingerprinting techniques and mug shots. In 1919, the department adopted its own flag.

In 1911, the department hired Samuel (Jesse) Battle as its first black officer. He went on to become the first black sergeant and lieutenant and retired after a thirty-year career.

In the 1910s, the NYPD began to deploy female matrons, who had entered precincts at the close of the previous century, to conduct undercover investigations. Their duties included investigating irregular medical practitioners, confidence tricksters, fortune tellers, abortion providers, and LGBTQ people. In October 1916, Margaret Whitehurst assigned to detective work in Brooklyn led an undercover investigation of Margaret Sanger's Brownsville birth control clinic. Some ambitious matrons also conducted plainclothes surveillance of public spaces, such as dance halls and bars. Those formally appointed as policewomen and patrolwomen during and after the First World War continued and expanded upon these policing tasks. Notably, policewomen conducted the 1926 raid of the gay and lesbian tearoom, Eve's Hangout, in Greenwich Village and arrested its proprietor Eve Adams.

In 1896 Commissioner Roosevelt authorized the purchase of a standard issued revolver for the NYPD. It was the Colt New Police Revolver in .32 Long Colt caliber. He also instituted required firearms training including pistol practice and qualification for officers. In 1907 the Colt Police Positive revolver in .38 caliber was adopted by the department. In May 1926 the NYPD adopted the .38 Special cartridge as the standard issue ammunition for the department and started issuing its officers the Smith & Wesson Model 10 revolver and the Colt Official Police revolver. In 1994 the NYPD replaced the revolver as its main service weapon and adopted the 9mm semiautomatic pistol as its standard issued sidearm, replacing the .38 Special revolver. NYPD officers who were "on the job" on or prior to 1994 could continue to carry their revolvers if they wished. The .38 Special can still be found as a backup or off duty weapon, particularly with long serving personnel. Also, the uniforms of NYPD patrollers were changed in 1995 back from the two-tone sky blue shirt and navy blue pants introduced in 1972 to one-tone navy blue shirts and pants.

In 1961, highly decorated NYPD officer Mario Biaggi, later a US Congressman, became the first police officer in New York State to be made a member of the National Police Officers Hall of Fame.

In 1970, the Knapp Commission, created by Mayor John V. Lindsay to investigate systemic corruption in the NYPD, found evidence of widespread corruption and made numerous recommendations to address it.

The economic downturn of the 1970s led to some extremely difficult times for the city. The Bronx, in particular, was plagued by arson, and an atmosphere of lawlessness permeated the city. Frank Serpico wrote about corruption he encountered in his time as a police officer in this era in a book, which was later turned into a movie and television series. In addition, the city's financial crisis led to a hiring freeze on all city departments, including the NYPD, from 1976 to 1980.

This was followed by the crack cocaine epidemic of the late 1980s and early 1990s, which was one factor in the city's homicide rate soaring to an all-time high. By 1990, New York, a city with 7.3 million people at the time, set a record of 2,262 murders, a record that has yet to be broken by any U.S. city. Petty thefts associated with drug addiction were also increasingly common.

In 1992, Mayor David Dinkins appointed the Mollen Commission, chaired by Milton Mollen, to investigate corruption in the department. The commission found that "Today's corruption is not the corruption of Knapp Commission days. Corruption then was largely a corruption of accommodation, of criminals and police officers giving and taking bribes, buying and selling protection. Corruption was, in its essence, consensual. Today's corruption is characterized by brutality, theft, abuse of authority and active police criminality."

That same year, Dinkins introduced a bill to create an independent Civilian Complaint Review Board. In response to this, NYPD officers violently protested, and rioted. They blocked traffic on the Brooklyn Bridge, demonstrated at City Hall and shouted racial epithets. The protests were sponsored by the NYPD union. Approximately 4000 NYPD officers took part in the violent protests. Police Commissioner Raymond W. Kelly sanctioned 42 of them.

In the mid-1990s, under Mayor Rudy Giuliani, the NYPD made use of the CompStat program under Police Commissioner Bill Bratton, as well as implemented broken windows policing. While CompStat was a concept that is generally attributed to Deputy Police Commissioner Jack Maple when he was a police lieutenant serving in the New York City Transit Police which came to the attention of then NYC Transit Authority Police Chief Bratton, in fact it was first implemented by Captain Mario Selvagi in Far Rockaway's 101 precinct. Since Selvagi was unable to secure the cooperation of the department's MIS department, he used pin maps. Selvagi went on to become a "superchief", but was forced out by Bill Bratton. In 1995, with Bratton as the former NYC Transit Police Chief, now as Police Commissioner, the New York City Transit Police and the New York City Housing Authority Police Department were merged in with the NYPD. The enforcement and traffic control elements of the City's Department of Transportation were merged into the NYPD in 1996. In 1998 the NYC Board of Education's school safety agents were merged into the newly formed New York City Police Department School Safety Division, to improve safety in NYC public schools.

== 21st century ==
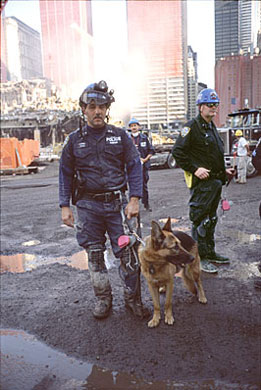
Department K-9 unit officers with a search and rescue dog at the World Trade Center site after the September 11 attacks in 2001

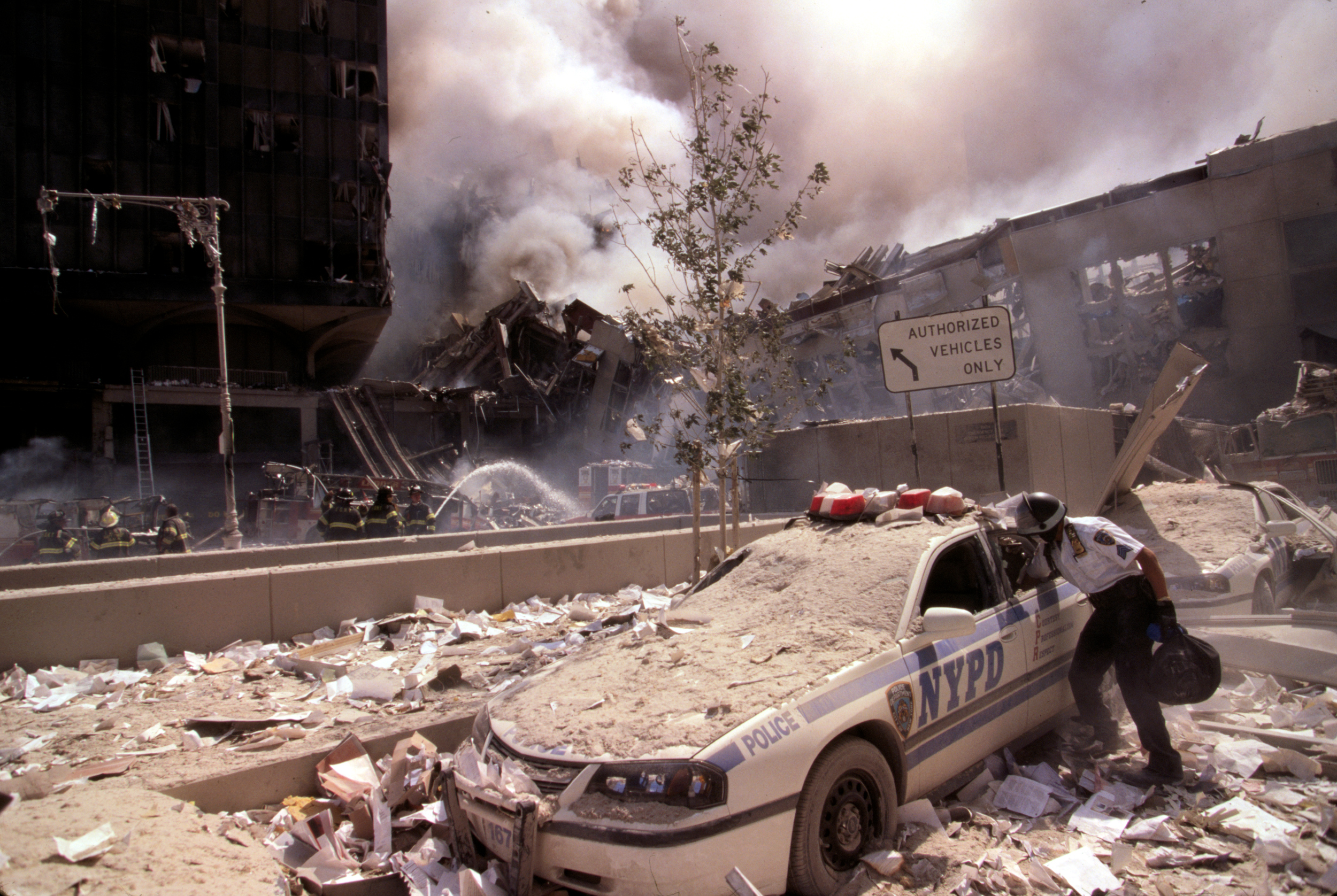
New York fire department personnel examining a smashed New York City police car, during 9/11.

During the 2001 September 11 attacks, 23 NYPD officers were killed when the World Trade Center collapsed due to terrorist attacks. More lives were lost that year than in any other year in the department's history. The NYPD Counter-Terrorism Bureau was founded in 2002 as a result of the tragedy and the threats to attack the city that followed. The Zone Assessment Unit, a spy unit of the NYPD's Intelligence Bureau disbanded in 2014, surveilled mosques and businesses owned by Muslims in its Muslim Surveillance Program.

On June 4, 2014, the NYPD made the largest gang bust in New York history, arresting 103 individuals of gangs at the Manhattanville Houses and Grant Houses with extensive help from the Manhattan District Attorney, Cyrus R. Vance Jr. 95 of the 103 people arrested charged took plea deals. Since the raid, shootings have declined 34 percent but neighborhood residents and gang policing experts feel that the sweep didn't reduce gang crime or gang affiliation and anticipate more violence, citing historic tensions between the developments and institutionalized racism as motivations behind the bust.

On July 17, 2014, Eric Garner was killed by NYPD officer Daniel Pantaleo through illegal use of a chokehold. The medical examiner later ruled Garner's death a homicide. The decision by the Richmond County Grand Jury to not indict Pantaleo sparked nationwide Black Lives Matter protests and led to the arrest of at least 300 protesters over two days in New York City. On August 19, 2019, then-NYPD police chief James O'Neill terminated Pantaleo's employment with the New York Police Department following a lengthy disciplinary hearing. In June 2020, the statewide Eric Garner Anti-Chokehold Act, which made the use of "a chokehold or similar restraint" a class C felony punishable with up to 15 years in prison, was enacted.

In 2014, two highly publicized attacks were committed against the NYPD. In the first, on October 23, two NYPD officers were injured, one critically, in a hatchet attack, but both officers survived their injuries. In the second, in December, two NYPD officers, Wenjian Liu and Rafael Ramos, were shot to death in an ambush in Brooklyn. In both cases, the perpetrators later died – in the hatchet attack, the suspect was killed by police, while in the gunfire attack, the suspect killed himself in the subway while being pursued by police.

In response to the shooting of Wenjian Liu and Rafael Ramos, the NYPD responded with a city-wide slowdown of policing in December. While the arrest rate for major crimes remained constant, the arrest rates for non-violent crimes and narcotics crimes dropped during the slowdown. The slowdown stopped in mid-January 2015.

In 2015 the Strategic Response Group was formed.

On June 20, 2016, three officers were arrested as part of a federal corruption investigation.

In 2021, the NYPD ended the department's longstanding law enforcement of previous marijuana crimes other than driving under the influence.

== Women in the New York City Police Department ==
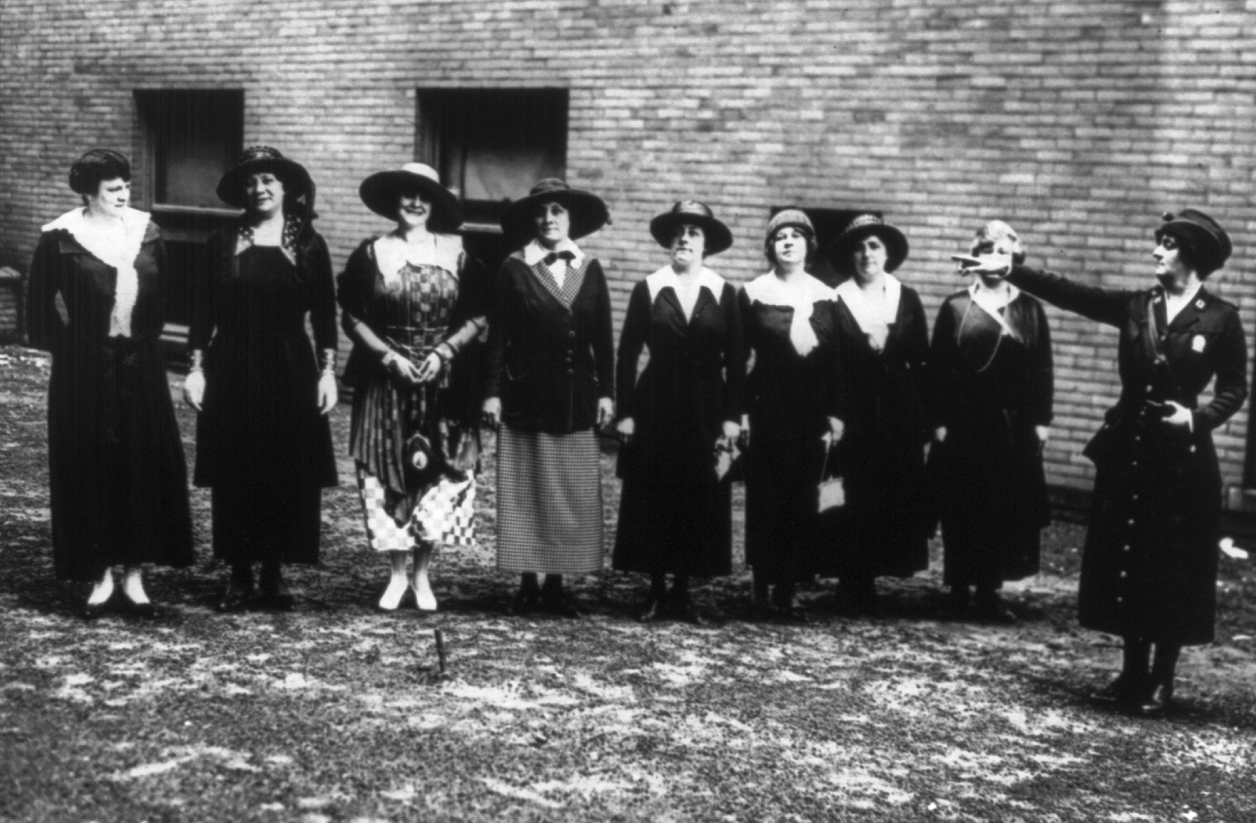
Capt. Edyth Totten and women police reserve of the New York City Police Department in 1918

In 1845, the New York City Police Department hired its first female jail matrons. Women's reform groups including the Woman's Christian Temperance Union and Women's Prison Association of New York campaigned to introduce women to police precincts in the hopes of improving the treatment of women detained there. Legislation was enacted to appoint female police matrons in 1888, and the first four were hired in 1891. Matrons were responsible for the care of the station house and the women and children held there. They tended to be working-class women and many were widows with a family connection to policing. In 1895, the first woman to work at Police Headquarters, Minnie Gertrude Kelly, was appointed Secretary to the Police Board. In the 1900s and 1910s, some matrons were assigned to detective squads to conduct investigative work. Although they often officially retained the "matron" rank and salary, contemporary newspapers and court records frequently referred to them as "policewomen", "police officers", and "detectives". In 1912, Isabella Goodwin officially earned the title of first grade detective, the first woman in the U.S. to hold that rank.

In 1918, the first female Deputy Commissioner, Ellen O'Grady, was appointed, and in August of that year the first group of policewomen in the NYPD were appointed (there were six). In 1919, the NYPD recruited Cora Parchment, the first African American woman in the NYPD and shortly after appointed Lawon Bruce, the second Black woman in the department. In 1921, the Women's Police Precinct was formed with 20 patrolwomen assigned; Mary Hamilton was assigned as director, however it closed shortly after in 1923.

November 13, 1923, Governor Walker appointed Sylvia Daly Connell, a widow with two children, the first woman Deputy Sheriff in New York State. She was assigned to Richmond County.

In 1924, the New York Police Department's Women Bureau was created. In 1926 Mary A. Sullivan was appointed to head the bureau, she would hold this position for twenty years.

In 1934, female officers began to have pistol practice with male officers. In 1938, the first civil service exam for the title "Policewoman" was given. About 5,000 women took the exam, with 300 passing it. In 1942, there began a requirement of a college degree for female officers. In 1958, women and men began to train together at the Police Academy. In 1961, Felicia Shpritzer of the NYPD sued to allow women the right to take the sergeant's exam. As a result of this lawsuit, 126 policewomen took the sergeant's exam for the first time in 1964. Shpritzer and another policewoman, Gertrude Schimmel, became the first female sergeants and after suing again, the duo became the first female lieutenants in 1967. Schimmel went on to become the first female police captain in 1971 and the first female deputy inspector in 1972.

In 1970, the first woman was allowed to take the test for Police Administrative Aides, and the first women were hired from the Police Administrative List. Also in that year, Police Commissioner Murphy assigned the first group of women to patrol. In 1973, the Bureau of Policewomen was abolished, and the first gender-neutral civil service exam for police officers was held. Also in that year, "Policewomen" and "Patrolmen" were officially renamed "Police Officers".

In 1974, Gertrude Schimmel was appointed as the first female Inspector. In 1976, Captain Vittoria Renzullo was appointed as the first Precinct Commander. In 1977, the first women were assigned to the Homicide Unit (there were nine of them). In 1978, Gertrude Schimmel was appointed as the first female Deputy Chief. Also in that year, the Department entered into an agreement to increase the number of female detectives.

In 1981, Suzanne Medicis became the first woman to receive the Combat Cross, and Sharon Fields and Tanya Braithwaite became the first women to receive the NYPD's Medal of Honor. In 1984, Irma Lozada became the first female police officer killed in the line of duty. Also in 1984, Mary Bembry became the first woman shot in the line of duty.

In 1985, the first Women in Policing Conference was held. In 1987, Paula Berlinerman and Joan Clark were appointed as the first civilian women Civil Service Managers. In 1988, Mary Lowery became the first female police officer assigned to the Aviation Unit.

In 1991, for the first time, the majority of the deputy commissioners were female. In 1992, Deputy Inspector Kathy Ryan was appointed as the first female Commanding Officer of the Mounted Unit. In 1994, Joyce A. Stephen became the first African-American female captain, and an Action Plan on Women's Concerns was prepared and submitted to the Police Commissioner. In 1995, Gertrude LaForgia was appointed as the first female Assistant Chief Borough Commander.

In 2021, Mayor Elect Eric Adams announced that Keechant Sewell would become the First Female Commissioner of the New York Police Department, as well as the 3rd Black Commissioner. On January 1, 2022, Sewell was sworn in as Commissioner. She was criticized for accepting the position in front of a mural depicting Assata Shakur, a fugitive convicted in the 1974 murder of a New Jersey State Police officer who is heavily reviled by the law enforcement community.

== See also ==
- Samuel J. Battle
- Charles Becker
- Thomas F. Byrnes
- Charles H. Cochrane
- Knapp Commission
- New York City Police Department corruption and misconduct
- New York City Civilian Complaint Review Board
- New York City Housing Authority Police Department
- New York City Police Commissioner
- New York City Police Department Highway Patrol
- New York City Police Department Auxiliary Police
- New York City Police Department School Safety
- New York City Police Department Cadet Corps
- New York City Police Foundation
- New York City Sheriff's Office
- New York City Transit Police
- New York State Police
- NYPD Rodman's Neck Firing Range
- Police memorabilia collecting
- Real time crime center
- List of law enforcement agencies in New York
- Police corruption
- Frank Serpico
