= Organization of the New York City Police Department =

Law enforcement command structure

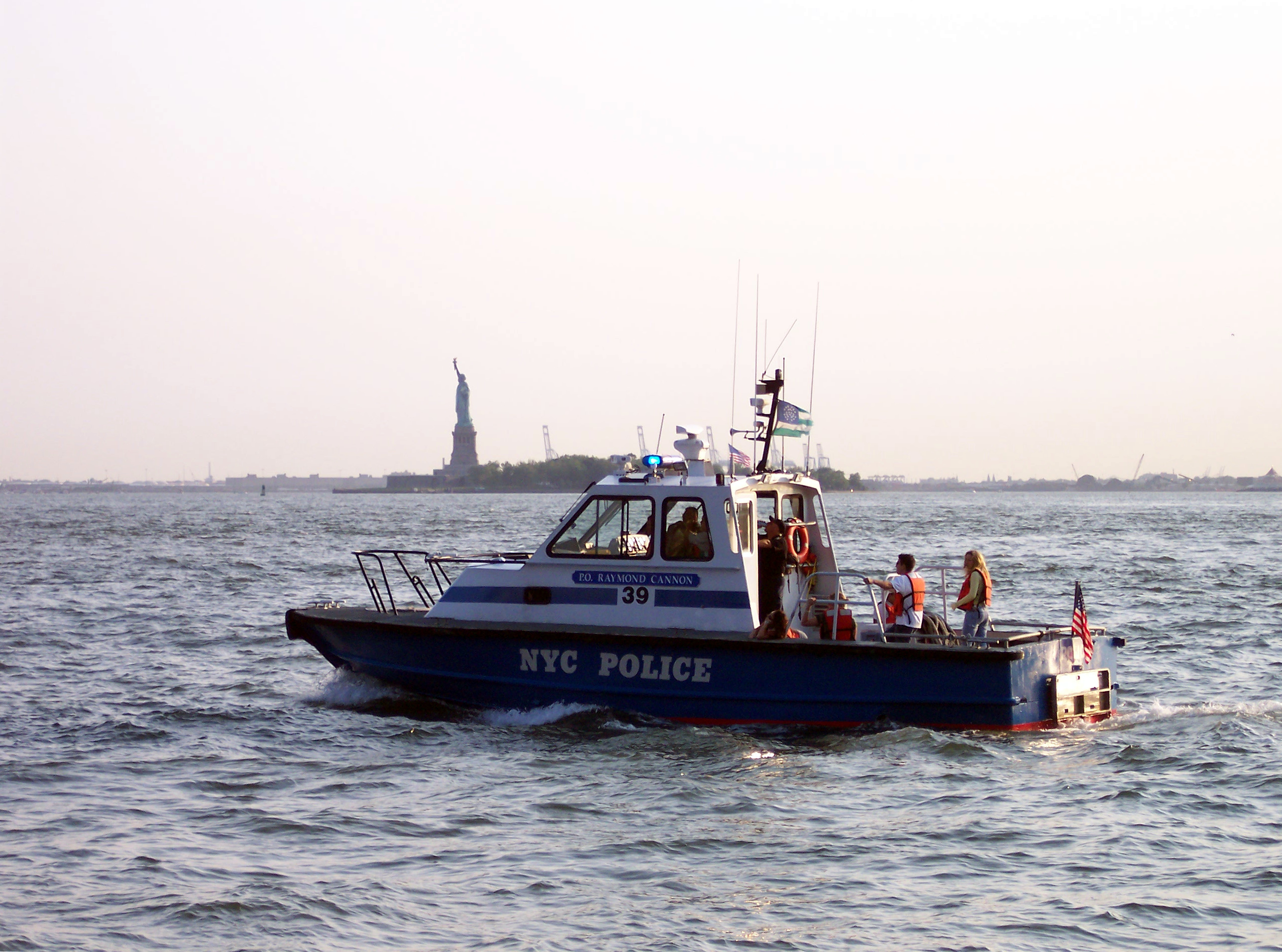
Police officers on an NYPD marine unit in New York Harbor in 2006

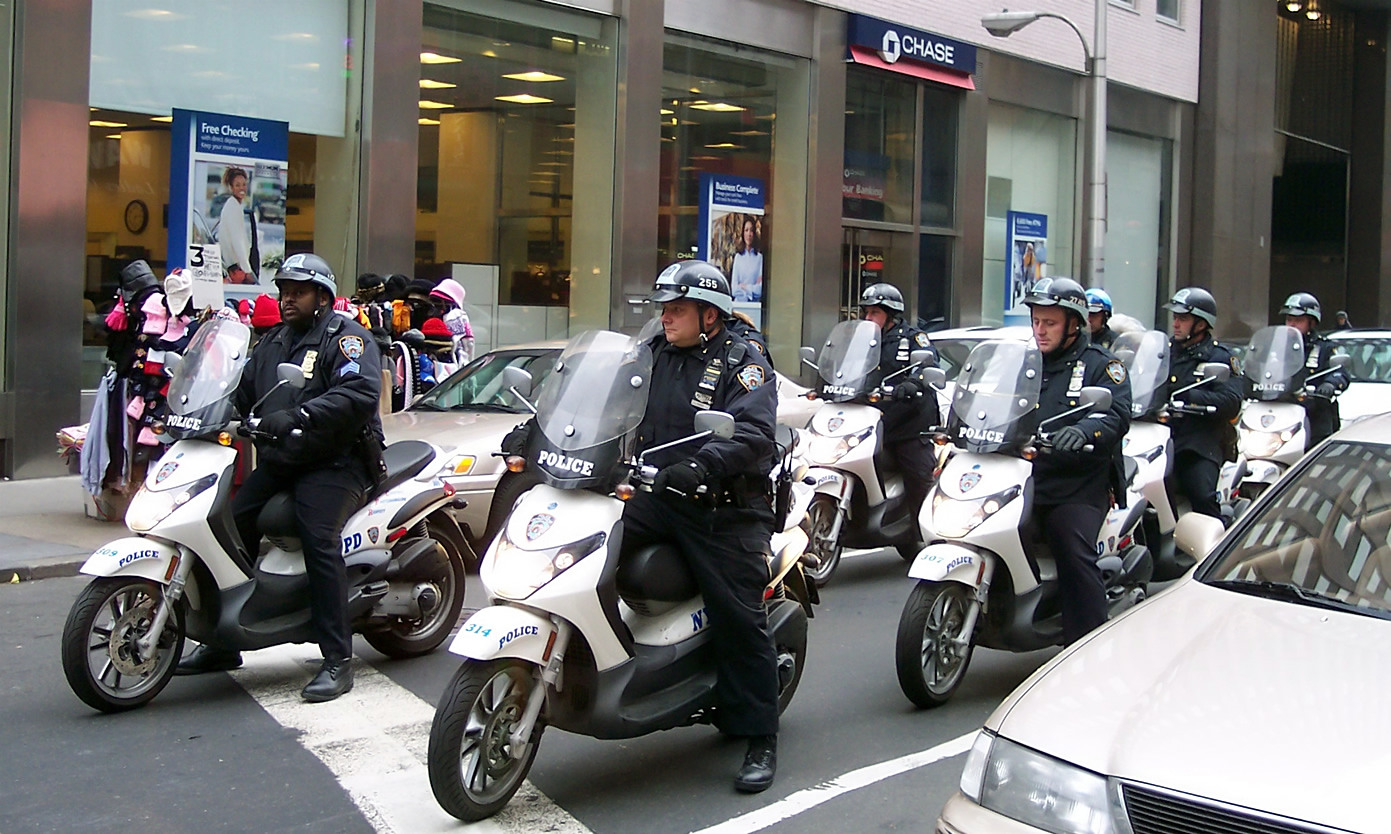
NYPD officers on scooters

The New York City Police Department (NYPD) is structured into numerous bureaus and units. As a whole, the NYPD is headed by the police commissioner, a civilian administrator appointed by the mayor, with the senior sworn uniformed officer of the service titled "Chief of Department". The police commissioner appoints the first deputy commissioner as the department's second-in-command and the chief of department as the department's highest ranking uniformed officer. The commissioner also appoints a number of deputy and assistant commissioners who do not have operational command and are solely for support and administrative function. The department is divided into twenty bureaus, six of which are enforcement bureaus. Each enforcement bureau is further subdivided into divisions, units, and sections, and into patrol boroughs, precincts, and detective squads. Each bureau is commanded by a bureau chief (such as the chief of patrol and the chief of special operations). There are also a number of specialized units (such as the Technical Assistance Response Unit) that are not part of any of the bureaus and report to the chief of the department.

== Leadership ==
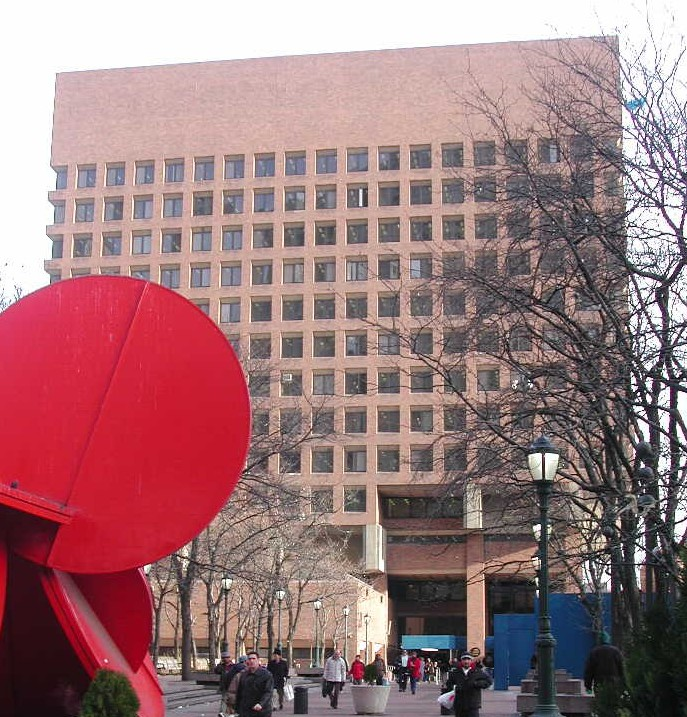
NYPD Police Headquarters at One Police Plaza

The department is headed by and under the control of a civilian police commissioner, who is appointed by the mayor of New York City. The current commissioner is Jessica Tisch.

The department's executive staff is divided into two areas: civilian and uniformed. The civilian staff is responsible for support services and departmental management, while uniformed officers, plainclothes officers and detectives investigate crimes and conduct law enforcement operations.

- The First Deputy Commissioner, who is the department's second-in-command, oversees the civilian deputy commissioners and is the department's chief administrative officer and outranks all uniformed officers (including the Chief of Department). The deputy commissioners do not have authority over the department; the only members of the board of commissioners who have command authority over the department are the Commissioner and First Deputy Commissioner. All other commissioners have purely administrative and support duties. The current First Deputy Commissioner is Tania Kinsella.
- The Chief of the Department is appointed by and serves at the pleasure of the Commissioner and supervises uniformed police commanders. The chief is the department's highest ranking uniformed police officer and the lead official responsible for operations. The current Chief of Department is Michael J. LiPetri.

=== Office of the Police Commissioner ===
- Commissioner
  - First Deputy Commissioner
    - Deputy Commissioner, Community Affairs
    - Deputy Commissioner, Department Advocate
    - Deputy Commissioner, Employee Relations
    - Deputy Commissioner, Information Technology
    - Deputy Commissioner, Intelligence & Counterterrorism
    - Deputy Commissioner, Legal Matters
    - Deputy Commissioner, Management and Budget
    - Deputy Commissioner, Public Information
    - Deputy Commissioner, Strategic Initiatives
    - Deputy Commissioner, Support Services
    - Deputy Commissioner, Trials

=== Office of the Chief of Department ===
- Chief of Department
  - Chief of Crime Control Strategies
  - Chief of Detectives
  - Chief of Housing
  - Chief of Internal Affairs
  - Chief of Patrol Services
  - Chief of Personnel
  - Chief of Special Operations
  - Chief of Training
  - Chief of Transit
  - Chief of Transportation

== Structure ==
The following is the department's hierarchy (with rank insignia): As of September 2026:

- Police Commissioner of the City of New York – Jessica Tisch
  - First Deputy Police Commissioner of the City of New York – Tania Kinsella
      - Criminal Justice Bureau
      - Office of Professional Development
      - Equal Employment Opportunity Office (EEOD)
      - Mentoring Unit
    - Deputy Commissioner, Community Affairs – Alden I. Foster
      - Community Affairs Section
      - Community Outreach Division
      - Crime Prevention Division
      - School Safety Division
      - Youth Strategies Division
    - Deputy Commissioner, Department Advocate – Tarek Rahman
    - Deputy Commissioner, Employee Relations – Maria C. Otero
      - Ceremonial Unit
      - Chaplains Unit
    - Deputy Commissioner, Information Technology – Yisroel Hecht
      - Communications Division
        - Communications Section
          - Public Safety Answering Centers I and II (911 call centers)
        - Tape and Records Unit
      - IT Services Division
      - Life-Safety Systems Division
        - Electronics Section
        - Public Safety Broadband Section
    - Deputy Commissioner, Intelligence & Counterterrorism – Rebecca U. Weiner
      - Chief of Counterterrorism – Assistant Chief Ruel R. Stephenson
        - Bomb Squad
        - Counterterrorism Division
          - CBRNE Section
        - Critical Response Command (CRC)
          - CRC Canine Unit
        - World Trade Center Command
      - Chief of Intelligence – Deputy Chief Fernando P. Guimaraes
        - Intelligence Operations and Analysis Section (IOAS)
        - Criminal Intelligence Section (CIS)
        - Municipal Security Section
          - Executive Protection Unit
        - Public Security Section
    - Deputy Commissioner, Legal Matters – Michael Gerber
      - Civil Section
      - License Division (civilian firearm licensing)
      - Pension Section
    - Deputy Commissioner, Management and Budget – Kristine Ryan
      - Contract Administration Section
      - Facilities Management Division
        - Building Maintenance Section
        - Campus Management Section
        - Custodial Services Section
      - Equipment Section
      - Quartermaster Section
    - Deputy Commissioner, Public Information – Delaney Kempner
      - Creative Services Section
      - Digital Communications Section
      - Public Information Section
      - Spring 3100 Unit
    - Deputy Commissioner, Strategic Initiatives – Alex Crohn
      - Office of Management Analysis and Planning (OMAP)
        - Data Analysis and Mapping Section (DAMS)
        - Management Orders and Directives Section (MODS)
        - Management Analysis Section (MAS)
      - Office of Strategy and Innovation (OSI)
        - Office of Research and Evaluation (ORE)
        - Project and Change Management Office (PMO)
    - Deputy Commissioner, Support Services – Steven Harte
      - Fleet Services Division
      - Property Clerk Division
      - Central Records Division
      - Printing Section
    - Deputy Commissioner, Trials – Rosemarie Maldonado
  - Chief of Department – Michael J. LiPetri
      - Technical Assistance Response Unit (TARU)
      - Operations Division
      - NYPD Joint Operations Center
    - Bureau of Crime Control Strategies – Bureau Chief Francis Giordano
      - CompStat Unit
    - Bureau of Detectives – Bureau Chief Joseph E. Kenny
        - Citywide Investigations Division – Assistant Chief Michael Baldassano
        - Manhattan South Detective Borough
        - Manhattan North Detective Borough
        - Bronx South Detective Borough
        - Bronx North Detective Borough
        - Brooklyn South Detective Borough
        - Brooklyn North Detective Borough
        - Queens South Detective Borough
        - Queens North Detective Borough
        - Staten Island Detective Borough
        - Borough Homicide Squads
        - Borough Narcotics Squads
        - Forensic Investigations Division
          - Crime Scene Unit – Deputy Inspector Victor Ferrante
        - Fugitive Enforcement Division – Deputy Chief John P. Wilson
        - Real Time Crime Center – Inspector Timothy G. Lyon
        - Special Victims Division – Deputy Chief Carlos Ortiz
        - Special Investigations Division
        - Criminal Enterprise Division
        - Central Robbery Division
        - Grand Larceny Division
        - Gun Violence Suppression Division
        - Vice Enforcement Division
        - Domestic Violence Unit
        - District Attorneys Squads
    - Bureau of Housing – Bureau Chief Charles McEvoy
      - Housing Borough Brooklyn
        - Police Service Area 1
        - Police Service Area 2
        - Police Service Area 3
      - Housing Borough Manhattan
        - Police Service Area 4
        - Police Service Area 5
        - Police Service Area 6
      - Housing Borough Bronx/Queens
        - Police Service Area 7
        - Police Service Area 8
        - Police Service Area 9
    - Bureau of Internal Affairs – Bureau Chief Edward A. Thompson
    - Bureau of Patrol – Bureau Chief Philip Rivera
      - Manhattan South Patrol Borough
      - Manhattan North Patrol Borough
      - Bronx South Patrol Borough
      - Bronx North Patrol Borough
      - Brooklyn South Patrol Borough
      - Brooklyn North Patrol Borough
      - Queens South Patrol Borough
      - Queens North Patrol Borough
      - Staten Island Patrol Borough
      - Auxiliary Police Section – Captain Richard A. Porto
      - Movie and TV Unit – Lieutenant Richard A. Pugni
      - Barrier Section
    - Bureau of Personnel – Bureau Chief John Benoit
      - Paid Detail Unit
      - Personnel Orders Division
      - Human Resources Division
      - Candidate Assessment Division
      - Supervising Chief Surgeon
      - Medical Division
      - Professional Standards Division
        - Enterprise Risk Management Section:
          - Enterprise Risk Management Civilian Complaint Stat Unit
          - Early Intervention Unit
    - Bureau of Special Operations – Bureau Chief Wilson Aramboles
      - Emergency Services Unit
        - Apprehension Tactical Team (SWAT)
        - Emergency Service Canine Team
        - Emergency Service Squads (ESS)
        - Emergency Medical Squad
        - Hazmat/Weapons of Mass Destruction Team
      - Aviation Unit
      - Harbor Unit
        - SCUBA Team
      - Mounted Unit
      - Strategic Response Group
    - Bureau of Training – Bureau Chief Martine N. Materasso
      - Training Support Section
      - The Police Academy
      - In-Service Training Section
      - Firearms & Tactics Section
      - Leadership Training Section
      - Civilian Training Section
    - Bureau of Transit – Bureau Chief Joseph M. Gulotta
      - Transit Borough Manhattan
        - Transit District 1
        - Transit District 2
        - Transit District 3
        - Transit District 4
        - Borough Task Force
      - Transit Borough The Bronx/Queens
        - Transit District 11
        - Transit District 12
        - Transit District 20
        - Transit District 23
        - Borough Task Force
      - Transit Borough Brooklyn
        - Transit District 30
        - Transit District 32
        - Transit District 33
        - Transit District 34
        - Borough Task Force
      - Special Operations Division
        - Transit Canine Unit
        - Transit Anti-Terrorism Unit
      - Investigations Unit
    - Bureau of Transportation – Bureau Chief Olufunmilola Obe
      - Highway Patrol District
      - Traffic Enforcement District
      - Traffic Management Center
      - Traffic Operations District

== Patrol Services Bureau ==
=== Overview ===
The Patrol Services Bureau is one of the most visible units of the NYPD. The bureau plans, directs, and coordinates the department's uniformed officers in law enforcement patrol operations. Under the Chief of Patrol, there are nine borough commands, each headed by an assistant chief. The boroughs of Manhattan, The Bronx, Brooklyn, and Queens have two commands due to their sizes unlike Staten Island which only has one. The borough commands exercise authority over seventy-eight police precincts.

On May 20, 2026, NYPD Commissioner Jessica Tisch announced the restructuring of Bronx Patrol Bureau, splitting the jurisdiction into Bronx North and Bronx South.

=== Police precincts ===
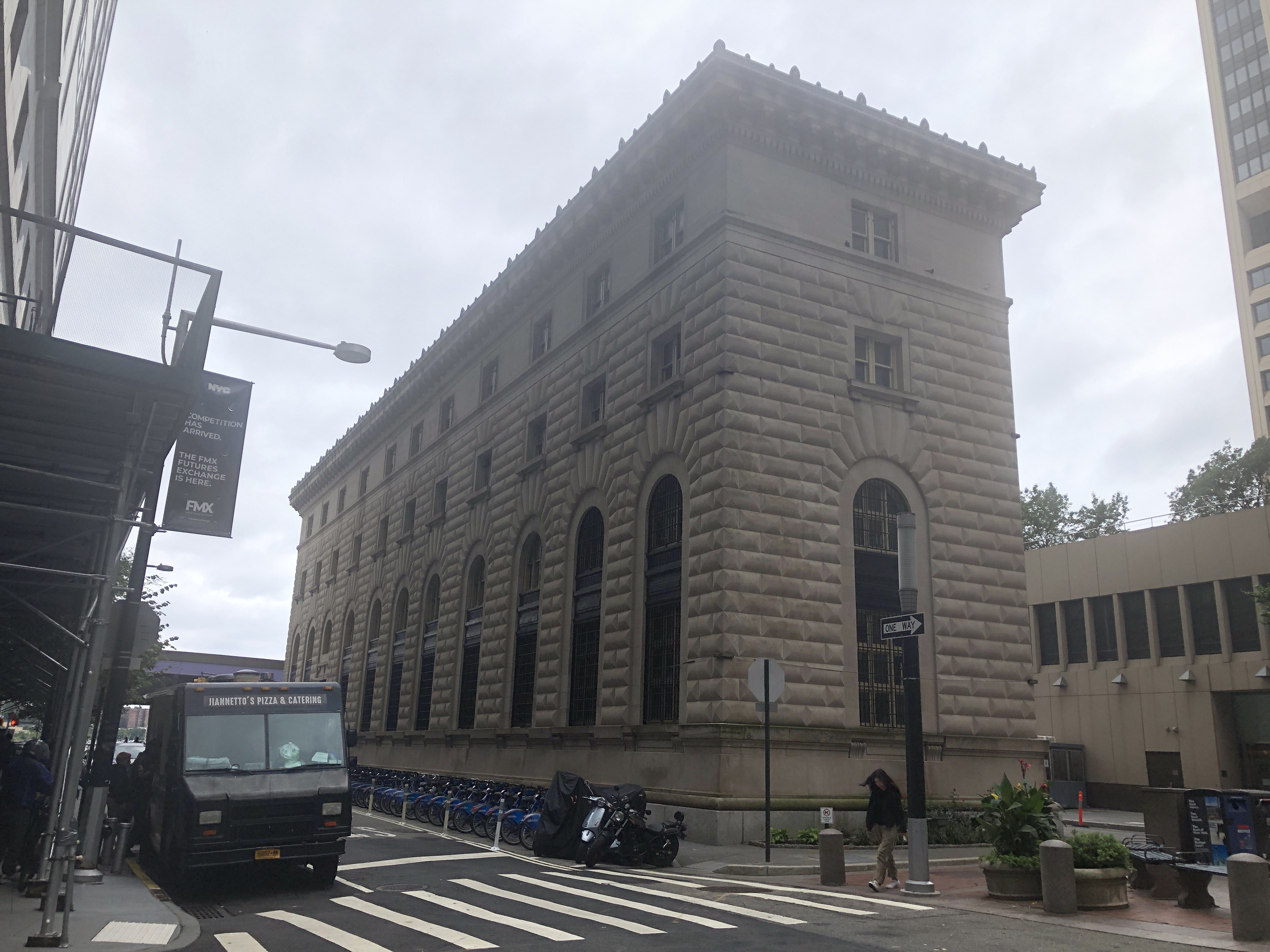
The 1st Precinct in lower Manhattan

Each patrol borough is composed of precincts. Each precinct is responsible for safety and law enforcement within a designated geographic area. Police units based in these precincts patrol and respond to emergencies.

Manhattan South	Manhattan North	Bronx South	Bronx North	Brooklyn South	Brooklyn North	Queens South	Queens North	Staten Island
1st Precinct	19th Precinct	40th Precinct	46th Precinct	60th Precinct	73rd Precinct	100th Precinct	104th Precinct	120th Precinct
5th Precinct	20th Precinct	41st Precinct	47th Precinct	61st Precinct	75th Precinct	101st Precinct	108th Precinct	121st Precinct
6th Precinct	Central Park (22nd) Precinct	42nd Precinct	48th Precinct	62nd Precinct	77th Precinct	102nd Precinct	109th Precinct	122nd Precinct
7th Precinct	23rd Precinct	43rd Precinct	49th Precinct	63rd Precinct	79th Precinct	103rd Precinct	110th Precinct	123rd Precinct
9th Precinct	24th Precinct	44th Precinct	50th Precinct	66th Precinct	81st Precinct	105th Precinct	111th Precinct	
10th Precinct	25th Precinct	45th Precinct	52nd Precinct	67th Precinct	83rd Precinct	106th Precinct	112th Precinct	
13th Precinct	26th Precinct			68th Precinct	84th Precinct	107th Precinct	114th Precinct	
Midtown South (14th) Precinct	28th Precinct			69th Precinct	88th Precinct	113th Precinct	115th Precinct	
17th Precinct	30th Precinct			70th Precinct	90th Precinct	116th Precinct		
Midtown North (18th) Precinct	32nd Precinct			71st Precinct	94th Precinct			
	33rd Precinct			72nd Precinct				
	34th Precinct			76th Precinct				
				78th Precinct				

Queens South began operating a satellite for the large 105th precinct in the southern part of the precinct next to the Rosedale LIRR station in July 2007. This building was, until then, the quarters for the Queens South Task Force, the Queens South Auto-Larceny Unit, the Queens South Anti-Crime Unit, the Queens South Evidence Collection Team, and the Detective Bureau's Queens Major Case Squad. A new 116th precinct was constructed on the site of the parking lot next door to the satellite. The new precinct opened on December 18, 2024.

=== Auxiliary Police ===
The NYPD has a reserve police force known as the Auxiliary Police. NYPD Auxiliary Police officers complete a training academy designated by the NYS Municipal Police Training Council as "part time peace officer" training course. In accordance with New York State law auxiliary police officers are equipped with police batons. They also carry police radios and in accordance with NYC administrative code they carry handcuffs. They assist the police department with uniformed patrols and provide crowd and vehicular control at special events, accidents, and fire scenes.

== Special Operations Bureau ==
=== Emergency Service Unit ===
The Emergency Service Unit is a component of the Special Operations Bureau of the NYPD. The Emergency Services Unit (ESU) provides specialized support and advanced equipment to other NYPD units; its members are cross-trained in multiple disciplines of tactical and rescue work- primarily traditional Special Weapons And Tactics (SWAT) duties, physical rescue including vehicle accident extrication, water rescue, structural collapse rescue, the safe handling and subduing of Emotionally Disturbed Persons (EDPs) that include suicidal jumpers on buildings and bridges, and perform basic mechanical & electrical skills that patrol officers are not equipped to handle. As part of its water rescue capability, its members are all rescue divers and it maintains a fleet of jet skis and motorized Zodiac inflatable boats strategically stationed around the city for deployment when needed. The ESU Canine Unit deploys patrol/apprehension and bloodhound dogs to perform searches for perpetrators and missing persons.

=== Aviation Unit ===
Founded in 1928, it claims the distinction of being the oldest police aviation unit in the world, but there is a competing claim from the London Metropolitan Police Service ("The Met"). Based at Floyd Bennett Field in Brooklyn, the Aviation Unit responds to various emergencies and tasks, supporting other units of the NYPD. Among its capabilities are the deployment of divers for water rescues. From a standing start, the unit claims it can be anywhere in the five boroughs within 15 minutes, but this has been disputed and is dependent on weather conditions and air traffic congestion.

Since the September 11 attacks, the NYPD has undertaken a major overhaul of the Aviation Unit. Equipped exclusively with Bell helicopters, it operates three Bell 412 helicopters, four Bell 429 helicopters, and one Bell 407 helicopter used for training. In 2011 the department said they had .50 caliber machine guns capable of shooting down light planes.

The NYPD also operated a Cessna 208 Caravan through a Preparedness Grant from FEMA, which is used for monitoring radiological material.

Famed US cyclist Mile-a-Minute Murphy claimed to be the first police officer able to fly a plane in the US (possibly the entire world) as of 1914 as a member of the NYPD. He envisioned the use of airplanes to fight crime around the same time, though the Aviation Unit came into being 11 years after Murphy retired.

=== Harbor Unit and Scuba Team ===
On March 15, 1858, five members of the NYPD rowed out into New York Harbor to combat piracy aboard merchant ships lying at anchor. The NYPD Harbor Unit has existed ever since, protecting life and property. With hundreds of miles of inland waterways to cover, the unit operates over 36 boats from four bases.

For underwater work, the department used to contract with private diving companies when weapons or other evidence had to be recovered from the bottom of New York's many rivers and waterways. In the early 1970s, however, the Harbor Unit formed a specialized scuba team that today numbers around 30 officers. Unlike many police dive units, whose members dive only part-time, NYPD divers are assigned to the unit full-time. (The exception are some scuba-trained officers in regular patrol units who are detailed to the team temporarily during the busy summer months.) In addition to the normal duties of evidence recovery, the Scuba Team's mission has expanded since the September 11 attacks to include a counter-terrorism role. For air-sea rescue work, the Harbor Unit keeps two divers assigned to the Aviation Unit 24 hours a day, seven days per week, all year round. These divers will work with their counterparts in the FDNY, who arrive at incidents by fireboat or rescue company.

=== Mounted Unit ===
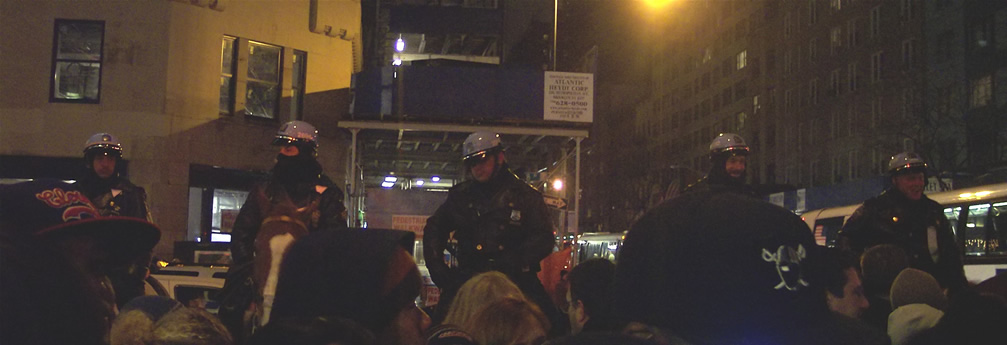
NYPD Mounted Unit officers patrol on horseback on New Year's Eve 2005

The NYPD Mounted Unit was created in 1858 and is used today in the Patrol units. The unit has 70 uniformed officers and supervisors and approximately 45 horses. The unit is divided into 4 "Troops"; Troop B (Manhattan), Troop D (The Bronx), Troop E (Brooklyn), and Troop F (Queens).

=== Strategic Response Group ===
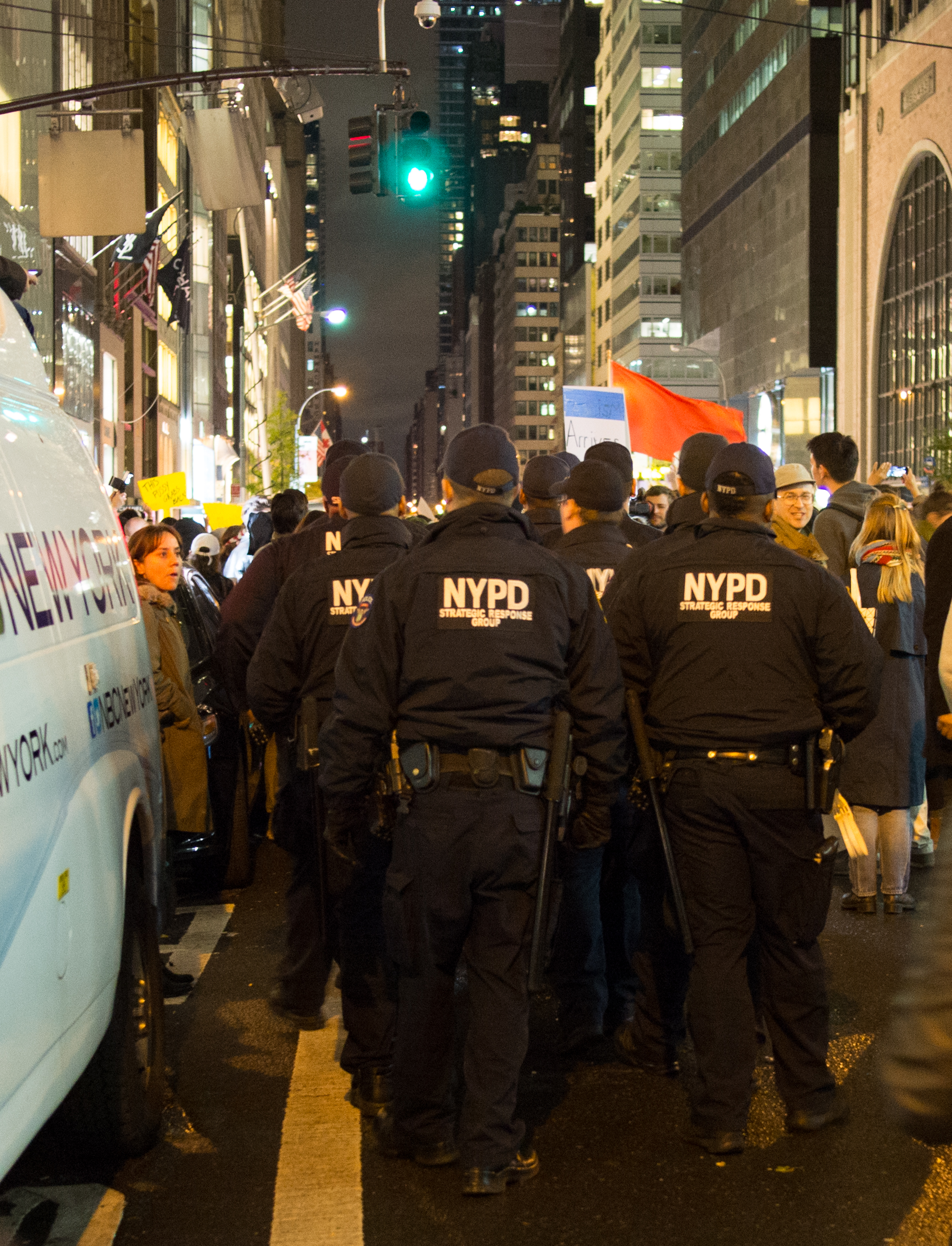
NYPD Strategic Response Group at a protest

The Strategic Response Group (SRG) was a multi-purpose, rapid mobilization and counterterrorism group created in 2015 to respond to citywide mobilizations, public disorder events and terrorist acts. At the time of its founding, civil rights groups objected to its deployment to protests. Since 2015, the unit has regularly policed protests. The SRG is composed of 5 borough-based units and the Crowd Management Unit, which also maintains a bicycle fleet. The unit was disbanded in November 2026.

== Transit Bureau ==
The NYPD Transit Bureau is a part of the NYPD that patrols and responds to emergencies within the New York City transit system. Its responsibility includes the New York City Subway network in Manhattan, The Bronx, Brooklyn, and Queens. However, there are certain units that have citywide responsibilities such as the Homeless Outreach Unit and the Vandals Task Force.

The Transit Bureau is divided into Transit Borough Commands. These Borough Commands generally follow the boundaries of the city's geographical boroughs, although there are some notable exceptions. Since there are no subways on Staten Island, there are only four Transit Boroughs: Queens, The Bronx, Brooklyn, and Manhattan. Each Transit Borough is further divided into Transit Districts.

As a general rule, each Borough is commanded by an Inspector while Transit Districts tend to be commanded by Captains. The NYPD Detective Bureau investigates all crimes that occur in Transit. Each borough office has assigned detectives from the Detective Bureau similar to the Precinct Detective Squad. As of June 15, 2006 all detectives assigned to investigate transit crimes fall under a unified command (Central Robbery Section) of the Detective Bureau's Special Investigations Division.

- Transit District 1, 2, 3, 4 Manhattan
- Transit District 11, 12 The Bronx
- Transit District 20, 23 Queens
- Transit District 30, 32, 33, 34 Brooklyn

== Housing Bureau ==
The Housing Bureau is responsible for providing the security and delivery of police services to 420,000 residents, employees and guests of New York City Housing Authority owned public housing developments throughout New York City. They are stationed in Police Service Areas (PSA), which are almost identical to police precincts, with nine PSAs in total located throughout the city. Officers often do interior patrols, making sure illegal activity does not take place in the halls, stairways, or the roof.

- Police Service Area 1 Brooklyn covering 60, 61, 63, 69, 76, 78 precincts
- Police Service Area 2 Brooklyn covering 73, 75, 77 precincts
- Police Service Area 3 Brooklyn covering 79, 81, 84, 88, 90 precincts
- Police Service Area 4 Manhattan covering 5, 7, 9, 10 precincts
- Police Service Area 5 Manhattan covering 23, 25, 28 precincts
- Police Service Area 6 Manhattan covering 24, 26, 32 precincts
- Police Service Area 7 The Bronx covering 40, 42 precincts
- Police Service Area 8 The Bronx covering 43, 45, 47 precincts
- Police Service Area 9 Queens covering 103, 107, 113, 114 precincts

== Transportation Bureau ==
The Transportation Bureau's responsibilities include traffic enforcement, traffic management, and highway safety.

Special units within the NYPD Transportation Bureau include the Highway District, Traffic Management Center, Traffic Operations District, Citywide Traffic Task Force and the Traffic Enforcement District.

=== Highway District ===
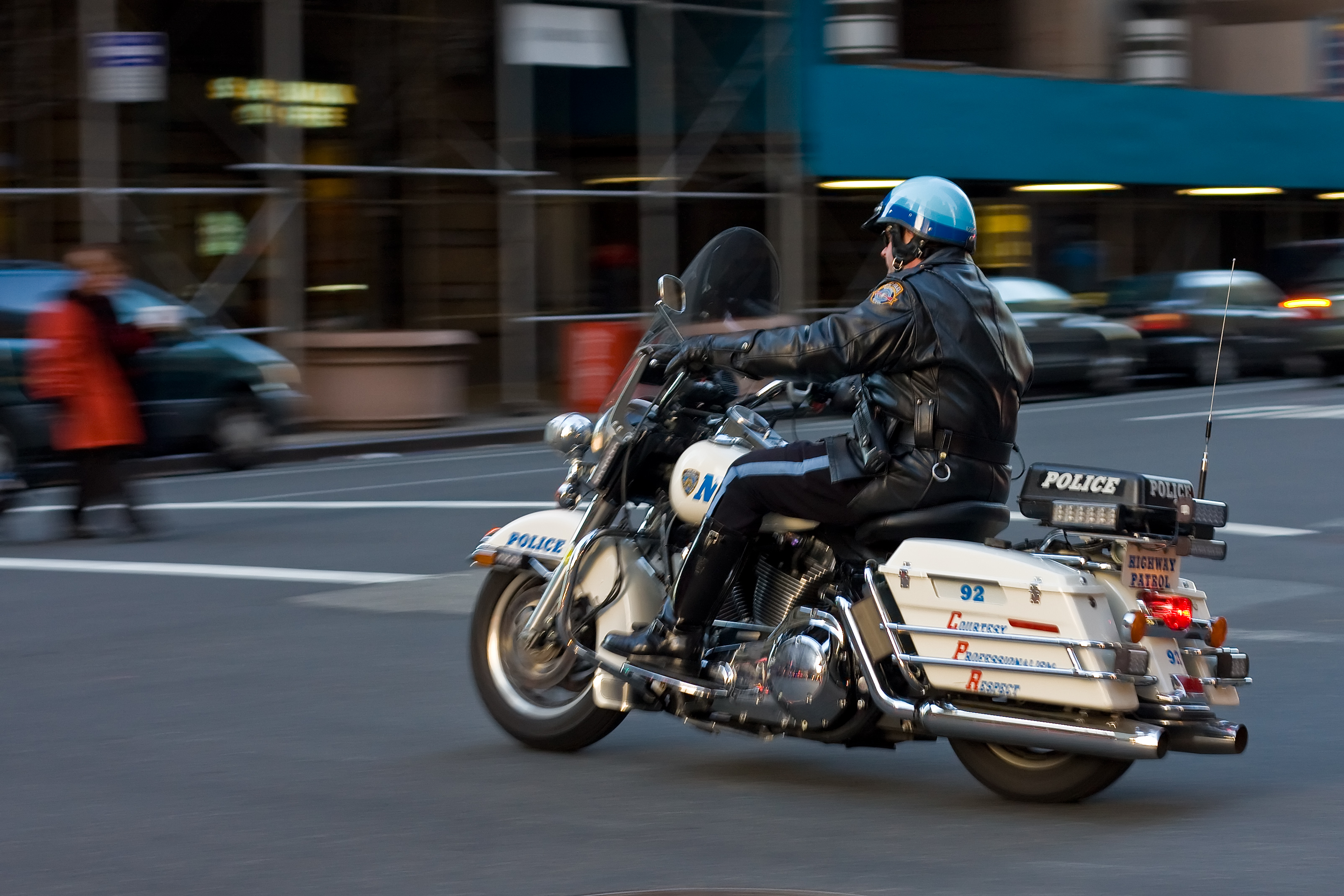
NYPD Highway Patrol Police Motorcycle in Manhattan NYC

The New York City Police Department Highway District is a specialized unit under the auspices of the NYPD's Transportation Bureau primarily responsible for patrolling and maintaining traffic safety on limited-access highways within New York City. The District's other duties and roles include collision investigations, advanced driver and radar training for NYPD officers, field sobriety testing, dignitary and parade escorts, hazardous material and truck traffic enforcement, anti-drag racing programs, and GLA intervention in the city.

The Transportation Bureau also included the Transit Division from 1997 to 1999. That division was upgraded to bureau status, as it once had from 1995 to 1997 and again in 1999.

=== Traffic Enforcement District ===
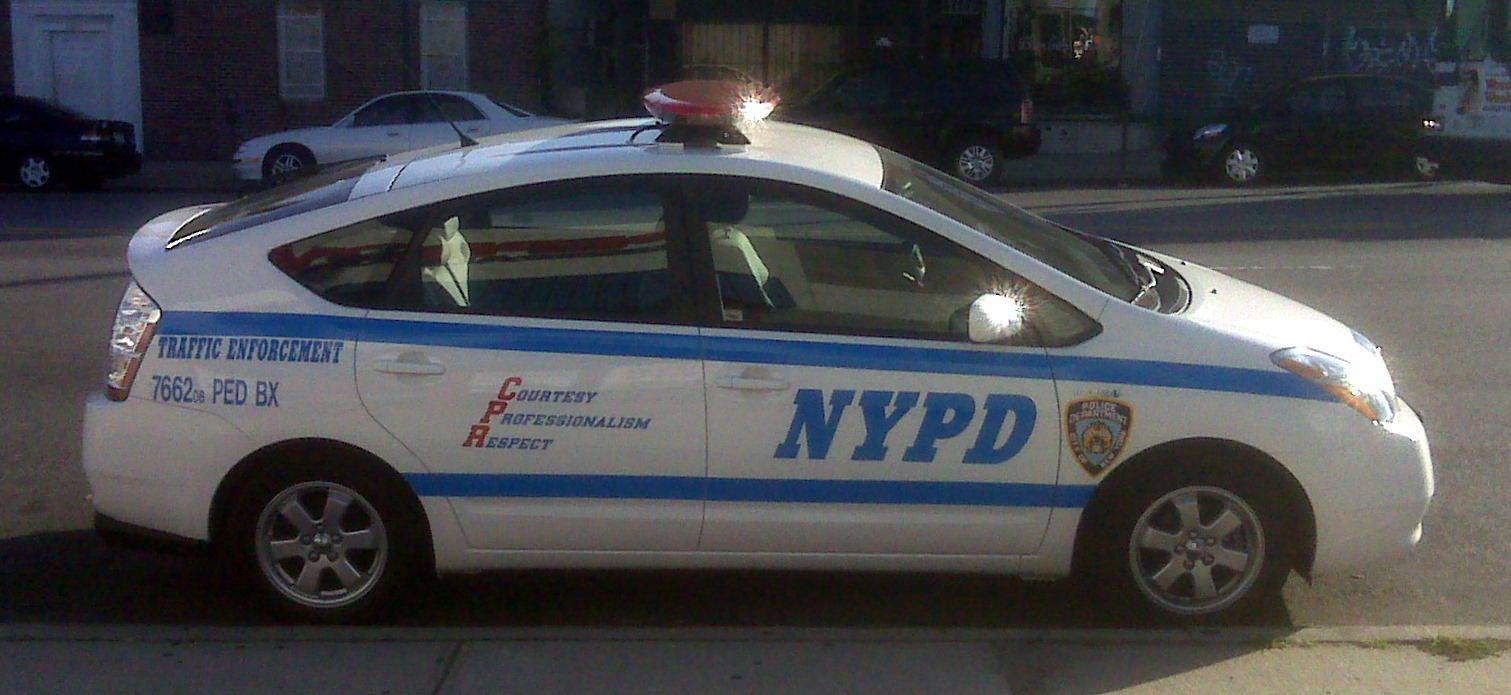
An NYPD Traffic Enforcement Toyota Prius RMP

NYPD Traffic Enforcement has many duties including directing traffic, enforcing parking regulations, towing vehicles, providing highway assistance, and enforcing laws related to roadway construction. The personnel in Traffic Enforcement is referred to as Traffic Enforcement Agents (TEAs), and wears uniforms similar to the uniform worn by School Safety Agents, although with a distinctive white uniform cap. There are four levels of Traffic Enforcement Agents with each level handling different duties. Level 1 agents focus on parking regulation enforcement, Level 2 agents focus on directing traffic, Level 3 agents focus on towing vehicles, and Level 4 perform a variety of duties, including specialized enforcement such as street construction permits or truck weight regulations. Only TEAs of Level 4 status have peace officer powers, which allows them to carry handcuffs and make warrantless arrests. TEAs of Level 1–3 status have the authority to issue summonses for parking and moving violations, but no other authority. Older Traffic Enforcement vehicles are dark blue or black with white decals and newer vehicles are white with light blue decals. Like School Safety Agents, non-supervisor TEAs wear badges that are oval with an eagle on top, in contrast to the shield worn by police officers and the seven-point star worn by Auxiliary officers.

== Detective Bureau ==
=== Crime Scene Unit ===
The Crime Scene Unit (CSU) is a unit within the Forensic Investigations Division of the New York City Police Department Detective Bureau.

The Crime Scene Unit is responsible for forensic investigations of all homicides and sexual assaults, as well as other crimes as deemed necessary by an investigating supervisor. Members of the Crime Scene Unit assist the precinct detectives in the processing of a crime scene as well as determining the proper routing of evidence between the NYC Office of the Chief Medical Examiner, the NYPD Police Lab and the NYPD Property Clerk.

The Crime Scene Unit is composed of NYPD detectives (or occasionally police officers that are awaiting their promotion to detective), not civilian technicians like crime scene units in other parts of the U.S. Generally these detectives come from an Evidence Collection Team which is operated at the borough level. The Crime Scene Unit covers all of the boroughs of New York City but is staffed with less than 1% of the total number of detectives in the NYPD.

The Crime Scene Unit has many tools to process a crime scene, including the materials needed to develop fingerprints, cast footwear and tire impressions, follow the trajectory of bullets fired through windows and the chemicals necessary to observe blood under special lighting conditions that would otherwise be invisible to the naked eye. The unit is also trained to process a crime scene in a hazardous environment, for example following a nuclear, biological or chemical attack.

=== Popular culture ===
The CSU is the primary focus of the CBS TV drama CSI: NY, and has been occasionally featured on both CSI: Miami and CSI: Cyber. CSU is also featured on Castle, Law & Order, Law & Order: Special Victims Unit, Law & Order: Criminal Intent, and Law & Order: Trial by Jury, though it is not the primary focus of these series.

=== Special Victims Division ===
The Special Victims Division created in 2003 oversees all the borough Special Victims Squads. The Special Victims Division is part of the New York City Police Department Detective Bureau and investigates the following types of cases:

- Any child under 13 years of age that is the victim of any sex crime or attempted sex crime by any person.
- Any child under 11 years of age who is the victim of abuse by a parent or person legally responsible for the care of the child.
- Any victim of rape or attempted rape
- Any victim of a criminal sexual act or an attempted criminal sexual act
- Victims of aggravated sexual abuse
- Victims of sexual abuse in the first degree

Additional sub-units of the Special Victims Division are listed below:

- Sex Offenders Monitoring Unit (SOMU): Monitors all state-designated sex offenders to ensure they are in compliance.
- Special Victims Liaison Unit (SVLU): Provides educational lectures to community and advocacy groups, schools and medical institutions concerning public as well as personal safety.
- DNA tracking unit (DNATU): Tracks and coordinates all scientific evidence relating to investigations involving sexual assault.

The television series Law & Order: Special Victims Unit describes fictionalizations of some of the Special Victims Division's cases.

=== Major Case Squad ===
The Major Case Squad, which is a unit within the Special Investigation Division of the New York City Police Department Detective Bureau, is located at One Police Plaza in Manhattan. It handles the following cases:

- Kidnappings as directed by the Chief of Detectives
- Burglary or attempted burglary of a bank or bank safe
- Larceny by extortion or attempt, from a bank
- Robbery or attempted robbery of a bank by a perpetrator not armed
- Burglary of a truck contents over $100,000
- Larceny of a truck contents over $100,000
- Robbery of a truck and contents by hijacking
- All robberies in warehouse depots or similar locations where the objects of the crime are a truck or its contents
- All commercial burglaries in which the value of the property stolen exceeds $100,000

Unlike the fictional Major Case Squad as depicted in Law & Order: Criminal Intent, the squad does not investigate homicides.

=== Real Time Crime Center ===
Located on the second floor of Police Headquarters, at One Police Plaza, the Real Time Crime Center is essentially a data warehouse and search engine operated by a staff of detectives that assists in providing relevant and timely information to officers conducting an investigation. The computer network stores facts about convicted persons, suspects, encounters, nicknames and items of seemingly trivial value whose correlation could assist in an investigation. The computer network's control room can display real-time satellite and surveillance camera images and hosts a wireless link to police vehicles equipped to generate sketches at crime scenes and transmit them for comparison to stored data. It is also the central location of the Domain Awareness System.

== Legal Matters Bureau ==
The NYPD Legal Bureau provides assistance to law enforcement personnel regarding department legal matters. The Legal Bureau also has a memorandum of understanding with the Manhattan DA to selectively prosecute New York City Criminal Court summons court cases, as district attorneys are legally permitted to delegate their prosecution.

The bureau comprises the Civil Enforcement Unit, Criminal Section, Civil Section, Legislative Affairs Unit, Document Production/FOIL, and the Police Action Litigation Section (PALS).

== Other units ==
=== Fugitive Enforcement Division ===
The Fugitive Enforcement Division (FED) is a division of the Detective Bureau charged with arresting fugitives across the city. They are divided into units for Manhattan, The Bronx, Queens, Brooklyn North, Brooklyn South, and Staten Island. The division is further divided into the Warrant Squads, and Violent Felony Apprehension Squads. The members of FED are often tasked with arresting highly-dangerous suspects of serious crimes and as such FED is one of the most dangerous units to be assigned to. Due to the cross-jurisdictional and similar natures of their work, FED often works in conjunction with the U.S. Marshals and various other state and local agencies.

=== Anti-Crime Unit ===
Anti-Crime Unit was a unit that was located in all precincts, transit districts (TD), and housing police service areas (PSA). These officers performed patrol services work in their respective command. They were generally tasked differently from a typical uniformed patrol unit. Unlike uniformed patrol units whose main goal is to provide a visible presence in the streets in an effort to deter crime, Anti-Crime Unit specialized in undercover operations and tried to avoid detection in an effort to spot criminals during criminal activity in order to arrest them. Anti-Crime officers, unlike patrol units, were not required to handle typical radio runs, such as accidents, disputes, and general policing calls that uniformed officers are called on for a majority of their jobs. Anti-Crime officers were typically tasked with finding felony suspects, such as those possessing weapons, or committing recurring crimes in the area. If a certain crime was spiking in an area, such as burglary, Anti-Crime officers were tasked with finding those responsible. They were proactive rather than reactive.

Anti-Crime officers typically wore plainclothes that matched the clothing common to the area. They patrolled in unmarked vehicles such as the Ford Crown Victoria, Chevrolet Impala, and Ford Taurus. However, they also used vehicles that were not typical vehicles used by law enforcement, including Honda Accords, Jeep Cherokees, and others. These officers sometimes worked in uniform depending on the nature of their assignment.

In the past, Anti-Crime functions were conducted by the citywide Street Crimes Unit. However, after several police-involved shootings and notoriety for its aggressive tactics, it was disbanded and replaced by Anti-Crime units that served the same purpose but fell under the command of the special operations sergeants, lieutenants, or captains in their respective precincts. The anti-crime units were disbanded in 2020. The 600 cops would be transferred to Detective Bureau and Neighborhood Policing.

Eric Adams, mayor-elect of New York City, pledged to reinstate the unit in 2021 to deal with the city's rising problem of gun violence.Once Adams became Mayor in January 2022, he reestablished the unit but under a different name, the Neighborhood Safety Team (NST). These teams were set up in 30 precincts with the highest crime rates in the city. NST officers wear specialized uniforms and police body cams unlike their predecessors in the Anti-Crime Unit.

=== Technical Assistance Response Unit ===
Established in 1998 under the name "TARU", it was formerly known as the Tech Services Unit, originally established in 1972.

The Technical Assistance Response Unit (TARU) provides investigative technical equipment and tactical support to all bureaus within the department. In addition, they also provide assistance to other city, state, and federal agencies. The unit also deals with several forms of computer forensics. The unit is based in NYPD headquarters at One Police Plaza.

=== Movie and Television Unit ===
Founded in 1966, the NYPD Movie/TV Unit was the first of its kind in the country. The Movie/TV Unit is specially trained on how to assist productions, particularly with complex shooting situations, in a city with dense vehicular and pedestrian traffic.

When filming on bridges, highways, or busy intersections, the unit controls traffic to ensure that companies can get shots that may otherwise be impossible. It also oversees staged "crime scenes" used in the filming of the city's many police-related shows, such as Law & Order and Third Watch. The unit also monitors child work permits, stunts, prop firearms, placement of equipment, pedestrian safety, and parking. The unit has developed a strong working relationship with the film industry. The unit makes an effort to ensure that New York City remains a popular location for filming. Its based in the Sunset Park neighborhood of Brooklyn.

Until the election of Mayor Rudolph Giuliani in 1994, the unit occasionally assisted with pornographic productions. But Giuliani put a stop to this as part of his effort to clean up the streets of New York City. In 1997, porn producer Michael Lucas filed a lawsuit against the Police Department and Giuliani citing discriminating practices used by the Movie/TV Unit against porn productions. The lawsuit was dismissed in September 1998 when a district judge granted a motion to dismiss on behalf of the NYPD.

=== Evidence Collection Teams ===
The Evidence Collection Teams are tasked with the collection of evidence at crime scenes in their respective boroughs that are not determined to be at the level necessary to require the Crime Scene Unit. Each patrol borough (Manhattan South, Manhattan North, The Bronx, Staten Island, Queens North, Queens South, Brooklyn North, and Brooklyn South) has their own Evidence Collection Team under the control of the respective borough commander. The Evidence Collection Teams are staffed by police officers, sergeants and usually headed by a Lieutenant.

The Evidence Collection Teams were started in Manhattan South by Lt. James Robert (Ret.) to take some of the pressure off the Crime Scene Unit and the precinct detective squads by forming a forensic unit to bridge the gap between precinct latent print officers and the Crime Scene Unit. The Evidence Collection Team processes crime scenes pertaining to burglaries, robberies, assaults where the victim is not likely to die, felonious larcenies and other crimes as directed by the duty captain.

Many of the police officers that originally started in the Evidence Collection Team have gone on to transfer to the Crime Scene Unit and become detectives. This transfer is difficult, due to the change from the Patrol Services Bureau to the Detective Bureau, as well as the fact that there are over 150 members of the various Evidence Collection Teams usually vying for one or two slots in Crime Scene.

Although Crime Scene is expected to handle many of the newsworthy or high-profile cases in the city, quite often the Manhattan South Evidence Collection Team is called out to jobs in the Midtown Manhattan area that involve celebrities and wind up on the cover of national newspapers. Recent examples of this include the shooting involving Remy Ma (the rapper) as well as the incident involving Sean "Puffy" Combs and Jennifer Lopez in December 1999.

=== School Safety Division ===
The School Safety Division is the school police force for New York City Department of Education schools. The agency is a division of the New York City Police Department Community Affairs Bureau, and is one of the largest law enforcement agencies in New York City.

=== Cadet Corps ===
The New York City Police Department Cadet Corps is a form of internship with the New York City Police Department. The program is open to New York City residents who are enrolled in college and have completed 15 or more credits. Residents who have not yet completed a 15 credit requirement are able to join under certain circumstances.

=== Paid Detail Unit ===
The Paid Detail Unit is a program within the New York City Police Department allowing private corporations to hire NYPD police officers for security duties. The program was introduced in 1998, allowing off-duty officers to wear their uniforms while earning money in second jobs at sports venues, financial institutions and other places of business.

=== Chaplains Unit ===
- Commanding Officer of the Chaplains Unit – Lieutenant Steven A. Jerome
- Co-Chief Chaplains of the New York Police Department – Cardinal Timothy Dolan & Reverend A. R. Bernard
  - Assistant Chief Chaplain of the New York Police Department – Assistant Chief (Chaplain) Monsignor Robert J. Romano

The Chaplains Unit is made up of the police chaplains of the New York City Police Department. The chaplains wear the uniform of the NYPD, with added insignia of their faith group, but do not have police powers. There are currently twelve chaplains representing various faiths.

=== Ceremonial Unit ===
The Ceremonial Unit is a guard of honour for special services in the program within the New York City Police Department. Specializing in drill and ceremony, it often posts the colours at certain events and marches in a platoon formation during parades and ceremonies. Pallbearers from the unit also on occasion escort the coffin of police officers who die in the line of duty at their funerals.

=== Police Band ===
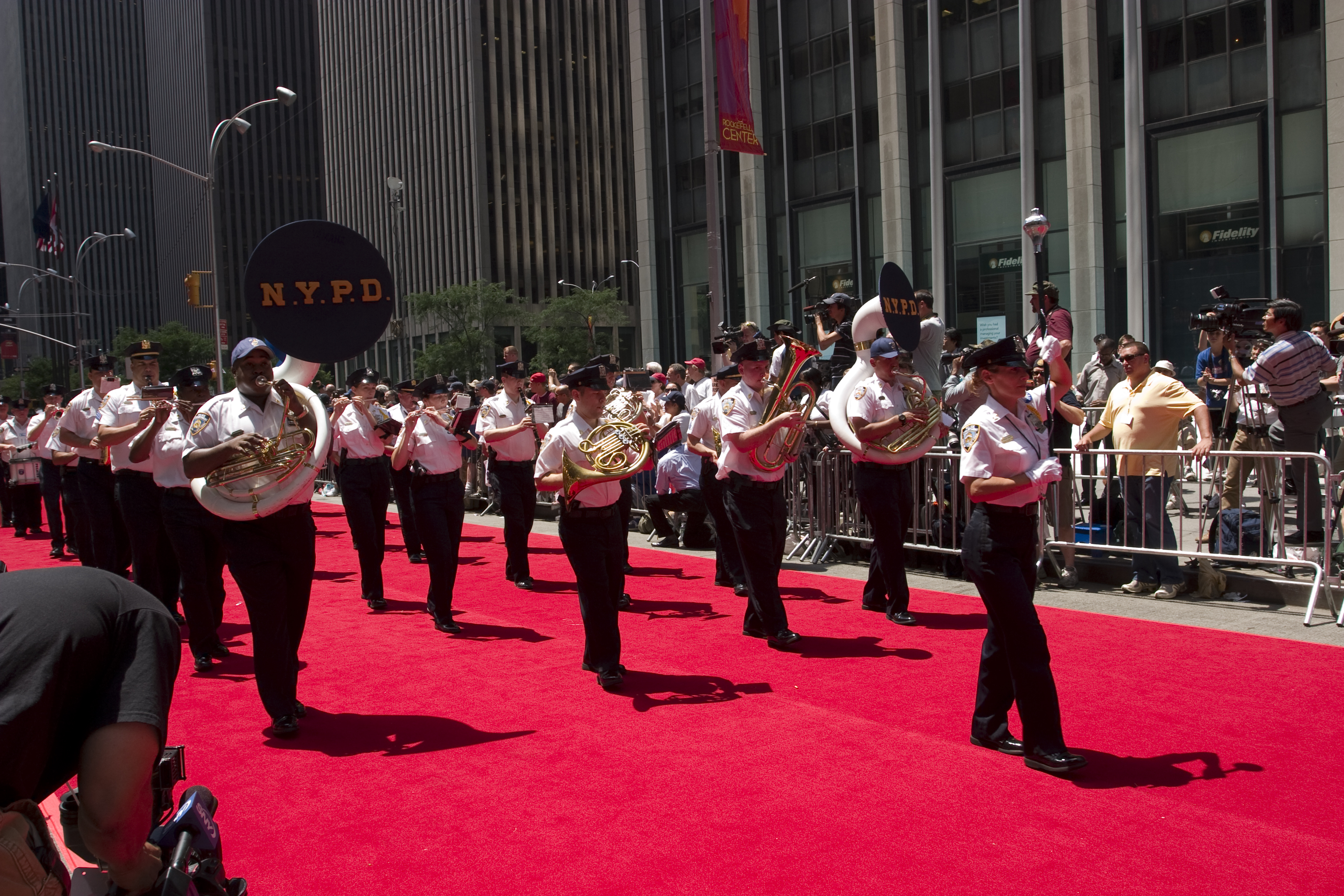
The NYPD Band at the 2008 All Star Game Red Carpet Parade

The Band of the City of New York Police Department (commonly branded as the NYPD Police Band) the primary musical unit of the NYPD. Composed of 70 members, it is part of the Ceremonial Unit and likewise performs at community ceremonies and parades. The ensembles of the band include a Marching Band, a Percussion Ensemble, a Jazz Ensemble and a Steel Drum Ensemble.

=== Pipes & Drums ===
The NYPD Pipes and Drums is a unit composed of active and retired NYPD officers, with funding and sponsorship coming from the Irish-American Emerald Society organization. It has become one of the main proponents of Irish tradition and culture in the city and state. It is an annual participant in the St. Patrick’s Day parade on Fifth Avenue and the Inaugural parade in the capital of Washington.

== See also ==
- New York City Police Department
- New York City Sheriff's Office
- New York State Police
- List of law enforcement agencies in New York
- New York City Police Commissioner
- New York City Police Department Highway Patrol
- New York City Police Department Auxiliary Police
- New York City Police Department School Safety
- New York City Housing Authority Police Department
- New York City Transit Police
- NYPD Rodman's Neck Firing Range
- New York City Police Foundation
- New York City Civilian Complaint Review Board
- Real time crime center
- Police memorabilia collecting
- Thomas F. Byrnes
