= RTCC =

RTCC may refer to:

- Real-time calendar/clock
- Real time crime center
- Russian Touring Car Championship
- Responding To Climate Change
