= Joe V. Nash =

American dancer & historian (1919–2005)

Joseph Vincent Nash (October 5, 1919 – April 13, 2005), was an American dancer, choreographer, and dance historian.

== Born during the Harlem Renaissance ==
Joseph Nash was born on October 5, 1919, in New York City to a butler and a housewife during the Harlem Renaissance on 99th Street near Central Park West prior to clearing for the New York Housing Authority's Park West Village. He was raised in the Manhattanville Houses in Manhattanville, Manhattan.

== Dance career ==
Before going on stage, he read Dance Magazine in The New York Times in order to teach himself dance.

In the early 1940s, he met Pearl Primus at the National Youth Administration and became her first dance partner before studying dance with Syvilla Fort and Katherine Dunham. After serving in World War II, he returned to New York in 1946 first performing on Broadway in Show Boat, and in London in Finian’s Rainbow. Later, Nash became a member of Donald McKayle's company, another African American choreographer of New York. He became a regular in Broadway originals, performing in My Darlin' Aida, Flahooley, and Bless You All. He also danced with Alvin Ailey in 1954 when he danced in House of Flowers, choreographed by Pearl Bailey. Starting in 1948, Joseph Nash became a dance instructor at Marion Cuyjet’s Judimar School of Dance in Philadelphia. His classes became famous in the city dance scene. One of his most talented students, Judith Jamison, became a world-famous dancer, becoming the artistic director of the Alvin Ailey American Dance Theater. Arthur Hall, a dancer and archivist, was also one of his students.

== Contributions as a historian ==
Nash collected books, articles, recordings, interviews, rare issues of dance magazines, and newspapers. Using his apartment as a contribution to dance history, he documented black dance memorabilia over decades, spreading everything throughout his apartment, eventually creating one of the country's largest collections of materials on the development of dance by black artists.

Dance Magazine and The New York Times often quoted him and his contributions to dance magazines and the newspaper. He also gave commentary and photographs to The Black Tradition in American Dance. He also became a historian for the American Dance Festival, giving lectures nationwide and becoming a consultant for the PBS documentary Free to Dance in 2001.

== Death and legacy ==
Prior to his death, he donated memorabilia from his collection to Florida A&M University, the New York Public Library for the Performing Arts at Lincoln Center and the Schomburg Center for Research in Black Culture in Harlem.

In 2004, he tripped and fell in his apartment in the Manhattanville Houses, pinned to the floor by a stack of books. He died April 13, 2005, from cardiovascular difficulties, at age 85. The Manhattan Office of the Public Administrator sealed his apartment to search for any relatives due to fears of his collection being scattered. Two nephews were later discovered to handle the estate. The collection later found its way to Duke University in 2009.
