= Grant Houses =

Public housing development in Manhattan, New York

- NYCHA property
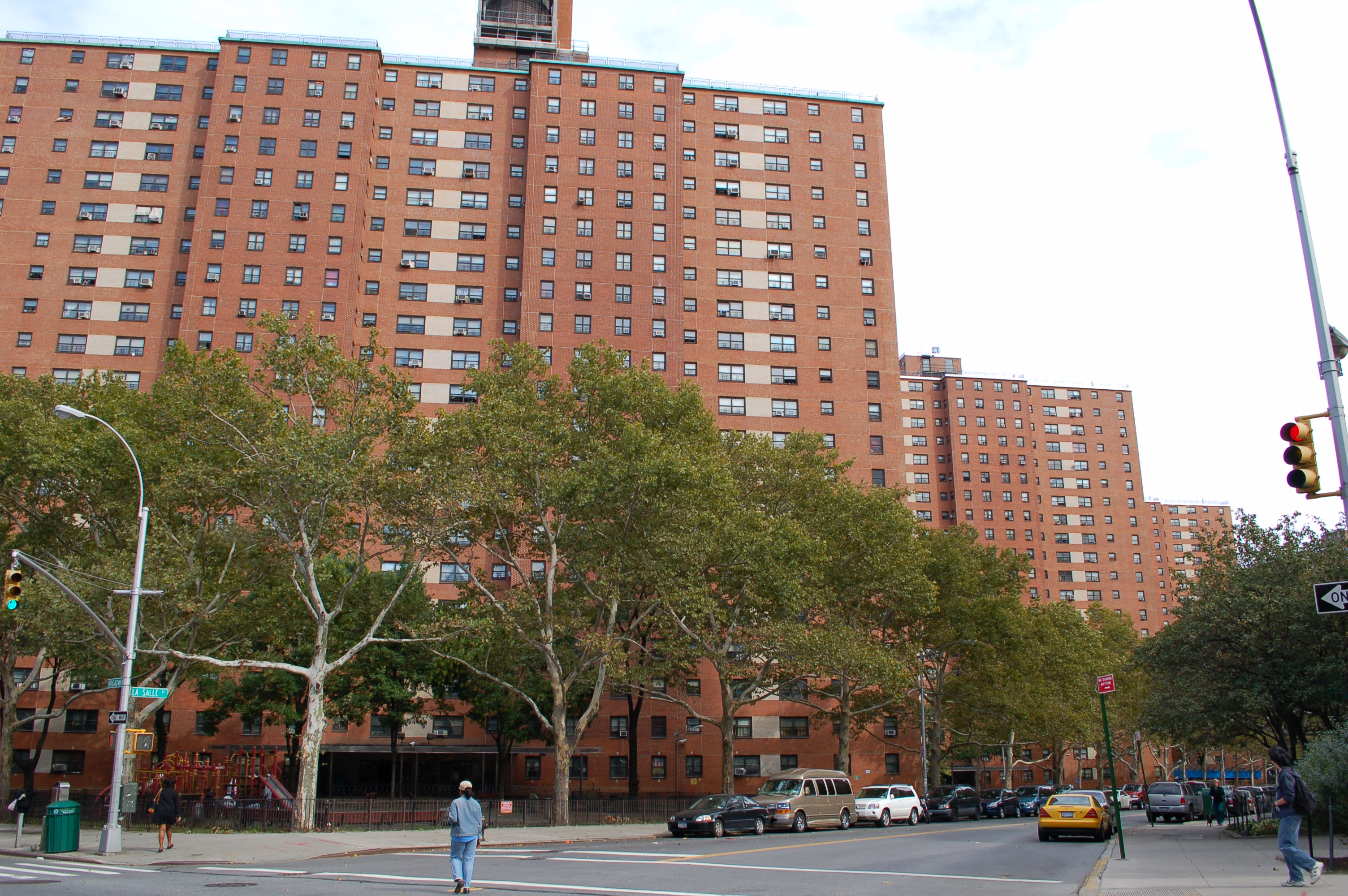
- Grant Houses in 2009
- Interactive map of Grant Houses
- Coordinates: 40.813830°N 73.957910°W
- Country: United States
- State: New York
- City: New York City
- Borough: Manhattan

Area
  - Total: 0.023 sq mi (0.060 km^{2})

Population
  - Total: 4,477
  - Density: 190,000/sq mi (75,000/km^{2})
- ZIP codes: 10027
- Area codes: 212, 332, 646, and 917
- Website: my.nycha.info/DevPortal/

General Ulysses S. Grant Houses or Grant Houses is a public housing project at the northern boundary of Morningside Heights in the borough of Manhattan, New York City. The complex consists of 10 buildings with over 1,940 apartment units on 15.05-acres and is located between Broadway and Morningside Avenue, spanning oddly shaped superblocks from 123rd Street and La Salle Street to 125th Street. The development was named after Ulysses S. Grant (1822-1885), a Civil War Union army general and the 18th President of the United States.

== History ==
Morningside Heights Inc. (MHI) was founded by Columbia University and other area institutions to begin renovating Morningside Heights to target the "undesirables" and stop neighborhood blight in the neighborhood. David Rockefeller and Lawrence M. Orton, a planning commissioner, were President and Executive Director of the organization. MHI helped lobby for slum clearance in the 1940s with the intention of using the legislation to displace residents on the fringes of the neighborhood in order to keep the area middle-class. MHI then encouraged NYCHA to build the Grant Houses and Manhattanville Houses to the north of Morningside Gardens, a middle income cooperative. This created a buffer between Morningside Heights and Harlem. Prior to the construction of the Grant Houses, Columbia conducted a survey of residents on the site of which more than half said they were mostly satisfied with current housing, noting that overcrowding was lower in the area.

Construction on the Grant Houses began in 1954 and was completed in 1956 at a cost of $29.2 million. Designed by architects Eggers & Higgins, the apartment buildings contained 1,940 units. With eight of the buildings at 21 stories, they were the tallest housing projects in New York City when built. The buildings are managed by the New York City Housing Authority. For maximum sunlight exposure they lie directly north of Morningside Gardens. The redevelopment projects together aimed to retain the racially and economically mixed character of the Morningside-Manhattanville area before clearance. The New York Times noted the racial identification of the first five families to move into the Grant Houses: "two white, two Negro and one Puerto Rican." President of City College, Buell G. Gallagher felt that the project would quickly become segregated, estimating 90% of residents to be African-American.

By 1958 it was felt that the Grant Houses and other large developments in the neighborhood were doing little to improve the area. The development displaced roughly 7,000 residents who were mostly African-American or Puerto Rican and did little to improve older buildings nearby.

In the early 1960s, crime began to rise and residents began organizing to obtain more police presence in the area. In 2014, the Grant and Manhattanville Houses were the site of the largest gang bust in city history. 103 suspects were arrested on a 145-count indictment from a grand jury with crimes ranging from weapon possession to murder. Residents cited historic tensions between the developments and institutionalized racism as possible motivations behind the bust.

== Notable residents ==
- Ray Chew (born c. 1968), musical director, lived there until age 7.
- Chris Jackson (born 1971), publisher
- Pedro Pietri (1944–2004), writer and a co-founder of the Nuyorican Movement.
- Keith Sweat (born 1961), R&B singer

== See also ==
- New York City Housing Authority
- List of New York City Housing Authority properties
