= Spring 3100 =

Spring 3100 is a magazine published by the New York Police Department for current and retired members of the service. It was first published in March 1930, at the direction of Police Commissioner Grover Whalen.

The name comes from the six-digit telephone number for Police Headquarters at the time the magazine was founded: SPring 3100. At the time, Police Headquarters was located at 240 Centre Street between Grand and Broome, which was in the geographical area covered by the "Spring" telephone exchange. When telephone numbers in New York changed to seven digits, in the late 1930s, the telephone number of Police Headquarters became SPring 7-3100, but the magazine retained the old number as its name. The magazine's original format size was 11.5" x 9", but in 1955 it was changed to 9.5" x 7".

Spring 3100 serves as the internal magazine for the NYPD. Historically it has provided information on notable members of the Department, promotions, transfers, decorations, significant arrests, technical information and Patrol Guide updates, command activities, and death notices. It was also highly popular with other law enforcement agencies around the world for the invaluable material found within its pages.

Before 1971, the magazine enjoyed higher levels of circulation and had 35,000 subscribers.

In May 1971, the magazine ceased publication, and its staff reassigned, but was brought back in February 1972. Its return was short-lived. In 1979, citing a severe manpower shortage, Police Commissioner Robert McGuire made the decision to cease publication. In 1988, at the direction of Police Commissioner Lee P. Brown, the magazine returned in a standard size format and has remained in publication since.
