= New York City Housing Authority Police Department =

Law enforcement agency in New York City that existed from 1952 to 1995

- Shield of the New York City Housing Authority Police Department

Agency overview
- Formed: 1952
- Dissolved: 1995
- Superseding agency: New York City Police Department: Housing Bureau

Jurisdictional structure
- Operations jurisdiction: New York, New York, USA
- Map of New York City Housing Authority Police Department's jurisdiction
- Area: 1,214.4 km^{2}
- Population: 8,274,527
- Legal jurisdiction: New York City
- General nature: Local civilian police
- Specialist jurisdiction: Buildings and lands occupied or explicitly controlled by the institution and the institution's personnel, and public entering the buildings and precincts of the institution

Operational structure
- Police Officers: 2700+

The New York City Housing Authority Police Department was a law enforcement agency in New York City that existed from 1952 to 1995, which was then merged into the NYPD. The roots of this organization go back to 1934 and the creation of the New York City Housing Authority (NYCHA). New York City Mayor Fiorello H. La Guardia authorized the hiring of security guards to patrol the city's public housing buildings. These guards eventually were trained and became the first officers of the Housing Police, which was officially created in 1952. The Housing Police, along with the New York City Transit Police, was merged into the New York City Police Department in 1995 by New York City Mayor Rudy Giuliani and continues today as the Housing Bureau.

The department had an auxiliary police unit and an emergency service unit.

== History ==
=== Creation of the New York City Housing Authority ===
In 1934, under the authority of the NYS Public Housing Law, the NYCHA was established. Housing Authority developments quickly began to sprout up around the five boroughs of New York City. It didn't take long for the city to realize that these developments, some like little cities, provided unique policing challenges. The initial response was a simple one - the formation of a security guard corps with individual guards assigned to specific developments.

As time passed, the problems of law enforcement throughout the City became more complex. Calls for service to the NYPD from housing developments increased dramatically, and it became clear that a more professional law enforcement component than the guard service was needed to deal with the complexities of policing diverse, decentralized public housing developments.

=== Beginning of the NYCHA Police Department ===
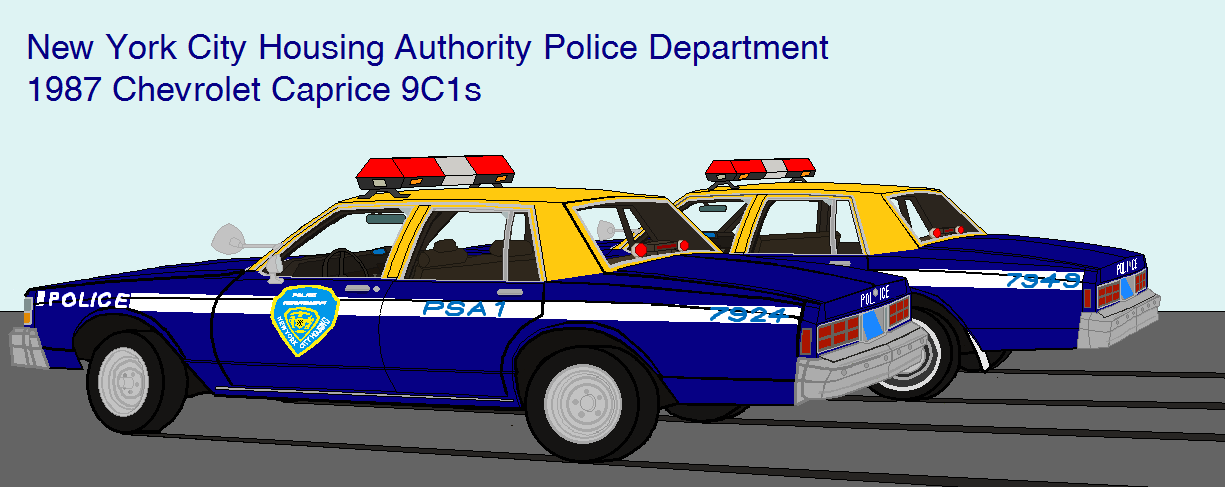
1987 Chevrolet Caprice NYC Housing Police, in older dark blue colour scheme

In December 1952 the NYCHA Police Service was formed to answer the above challenge.

Initially, the officers assigned to this new group were designated as "special patrolmen". This designation gave them limited peace officer powers, including the authority to effect arrests and to carry firearms while on duty. The qualifications for employment in this new group were more stringent than those required of the former guard service, and their training was more comprehensive.

Although these officers performed more effectively and efficiently than the former guard service, this arrangement also had its limitations. However, this was all to change.

In 1958, legislation was enacted making members of the Housing Authority "special patrolman" fully sworn peace officers. Subsequently, in 1966, the state legislature designated the Housing Police a duly constituted Police Department. As part of that same legislation, the role of law enforcement agents became more specific.

Members of police departments throughout New York State, including the NYC Police Department, NYC Transit Police Department, and the NYC Housing Police Department, were designated "police officers" with broad arrest powers. Their former category of "peace officer" was reserved for other members of the law enforcement community who were granted less authority and powers of arrest. This latter group composed of Tri-Borough bridge and tunnels officers, corrections officers, court officers, and others whose need for arrest powers was less immediate.

By this time, the Housing Police had already established a reputation as an effective, foot patrol oriented, neighborhood police force. Groups of officers were assigned to individual developments or clusters of several adjoining developments. This resulted in the officers developing an intimate knowledge of the tenants and conditions in their assigned developments. Their awareness of potential and actual criminal activity greatly enhanced their ability to suppress crime, as well as making them an excellent source of intelligence for detectives investigating past crimes.

The downside of this strategy was an inadequate amount of first line supervision. Because of the expanded span of control for sergeants (they could have as many as 40 officers assigned, working at several different housing developments) officers got little field supervision.

=== Development of the Police Service Area system ===
The department recognized this problem and it was rectified in 1978, with the establishment of the Police Service Area concept. This concept was based on the number of calls for service, the personnel available, and the geographical area served. Considering these factors, nine (9) PSAs, covering all the public housing developments in the City of New York, were established. There was also a tenth PSA, PSA 1-A, which served Staten Island.

The PSAs were essentially precinct type operations, with officers reporting to one of the nine locations. In addition, the Housing Police radio network was scrapped in favor of assimilation into the 911 radio network. Further, the training of all new police officers was shifted to the NYC Police Academy.

This new distribution of resources alleviated several of the deficiencies of the previous system. It also provided greater interplay between officers of the NYPD and the Housing Police. Officers now were part of a precinct-type operation, standing roll call, being seen by their supervisors on a daily basis, exchanging information with other officers within their command, and responding to radio calls transmitted via the 911 system.

The establishment of the PSAs marked the beginning of the modern era of the Housing Police Department. The department already had Patrol Bureau, Detective Bureau, Internal Affairs Bureau, Support Service Bureau, and Personnel Services Bureau components. But after the establishment of the PSAs these Bureaus grew and became more diversified with many specialized units created to deal with special conditions and circumstances.

== Bureaus ==
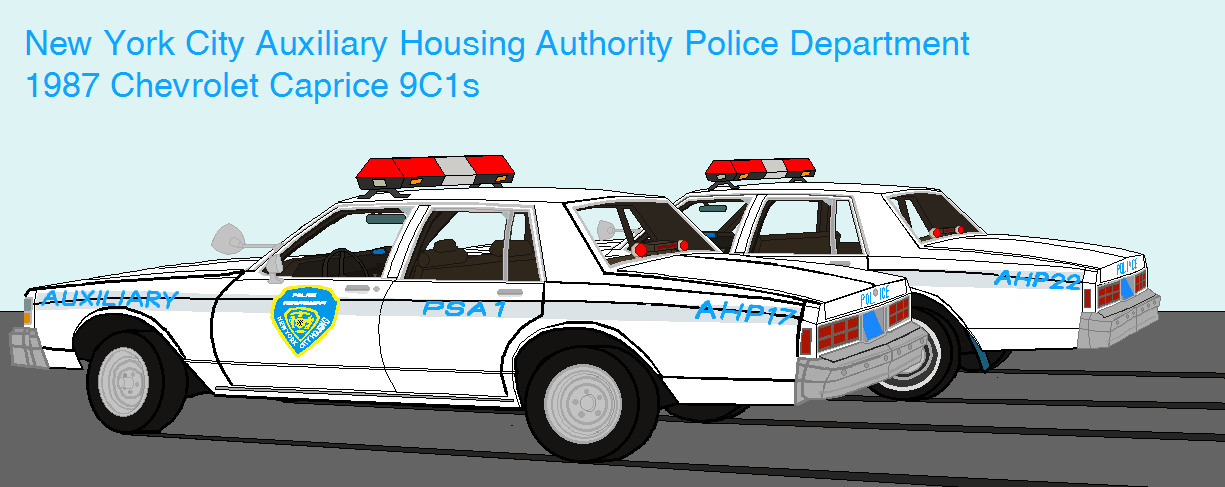
1987 Chevrolet Caprice NYC Auxiliary Housing Police, in lighter colour scheme

The Patrol Bureau, the largest of the Bureaus, created and deployed Project Stabilization Units, Narcotics Units, Anti Crime Units, Bicycle Units, and Emergency Rescue Units.

The Detective Bureau deployed a Homicide/Major Case Squad, Robbery Squad, Burglary Squad, Warrant Squad, Elevator Vandalism Squad, and each PSA had a Precinct Detective Unit assigned.

The Internal Affairs Bureau had a Special Investigation Unit, and the Civilian Complaint Review Unit.

The Support Services Bureau had the Motor Pool, responsible for the acquisition, and maintenance of all department vehicles now numbering over 200.

And the Personnel Services Bureau fielded the Police Academy Unit, the Firearms Training Unit and the Driver Training Unit, making the department the largest and most professional Housing Police Department in the world.

== Personnel ==
In the span of 43 years, the department moved from 47 sworn officers in December 1952, to a diverse Department of over 2,700 sworn personnel in 1995.

== 1995 Merger ==
On May 1, 1995, the New York City Housing Authority Police Department was merged into the New York City Police Department and now exists in spirit in the NYPD Housing Bureau.

== See also ==
- Law enforcement in New York City
- New York City Police Department
- New York City Transit Police
