= Responding To Climate Change =

Climate change organization

Responding to Climate Change (RTCC) is an organization focused on climate change which was founded in 2002. It is an official observer in many UN Conventions, such as the United Nations Framework Convention on Climate Change (UNFCCC), the Convention for Biological Diversity (CBD), and the United Nations Convention to Combat Desertification (UNCCD). It also holds Special Advisory Status with the United Nations Economic and Social Council (ECOSOC).
