= Manhattanville Houses =

Public housing development in Manhattan, New York

- NYCHA property
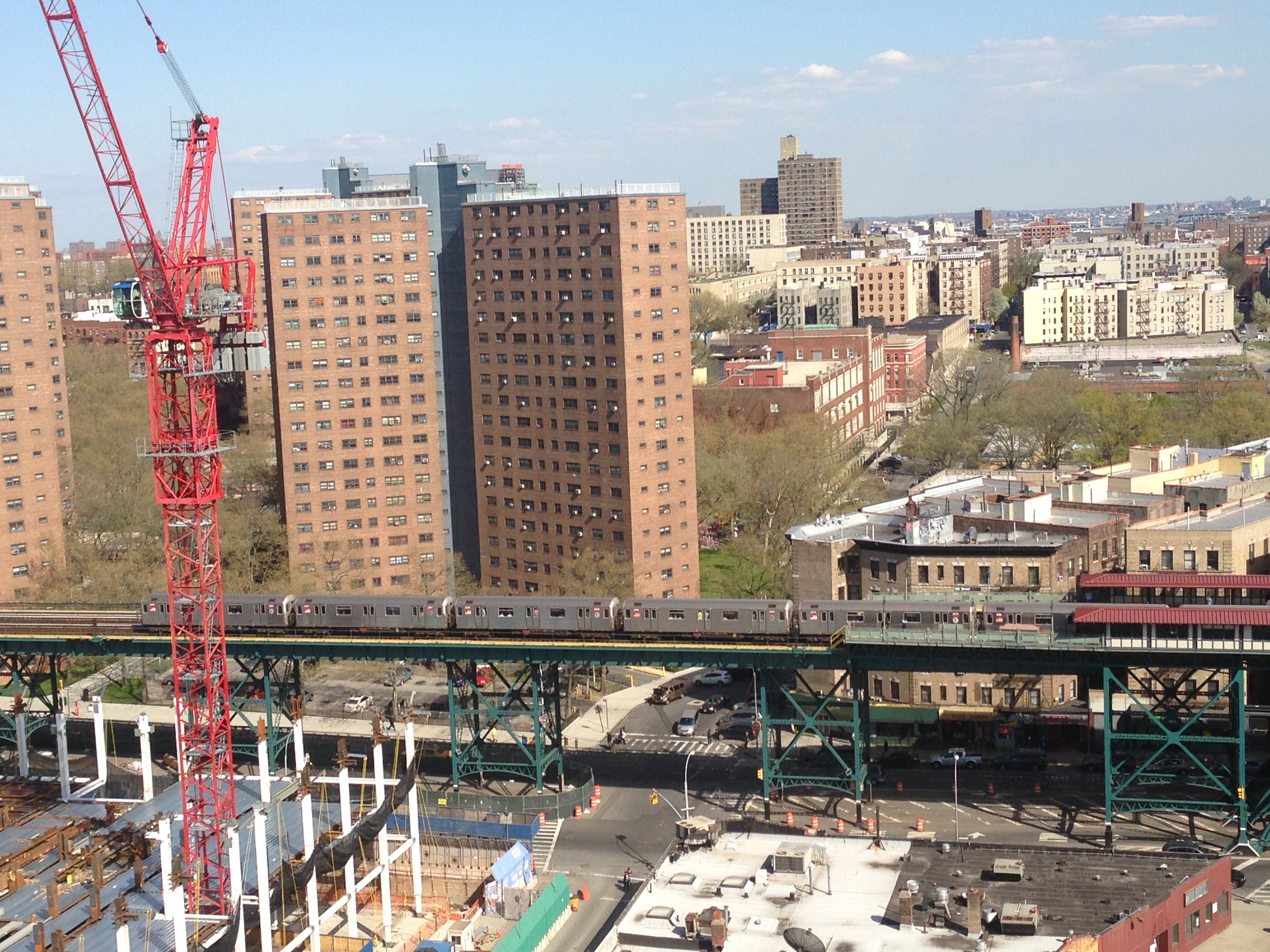
- Interactive map of Manhattanville Houses
- Coordinates: 40.816230°N 73.957140°W
- Country: United States
- State: New York
- City: New York City
- Borough: Manhattan

Area
  - Total: 0.019 sq mi (0.049 km^{2})

Population
  - Total: 3,055
  - Density: 160,000/sq mi (62,000/km^{2})
- ZIP codes: 10027
- Area codes: 212, 332, 646, and 917
- Website: my.nycha.info/DevPortal/

Manhattanville Houses is a public housing project in the Manhattanville section of West Harlem, in the borough of Manhattan, New York City. The project is located between Broadway and Amsterdam Avenue, spanning a superblock from 129th Street to 133rd Street and is managed by the New York City Housing Authority. The project consists of six 20-story buildings containing 1,272 apartment units. The complex was listed on the National Register of Historic Places in 2024.

== Development ==
The site formerly consisted of city blocks of tenements which were demolished via slum clearance, beginning in 1957.

Manhattanville Houses were completed June 30, 1961 at a cost of $24 million. The project was designed by modernist architect William Lescaze in the "tower in the park" concept in vogue during the mid-20th century which emphasized view corridors that bring air and light to housing residents.

Safety quickly began to decline in the development and tenants began to organize and patrol the lobbies. In 1962, NYCHA added six new guards to patrol the development.

On June 4, 2014, the NYPD made the largest gang bust in New York history, arresting 103 individuals of gangs at the Manhattanville and Grant Houses with extensive help from the Manhattan District Attorney, Cyrus R. Vance Jr. 95 of the 103 people arrested charged took plea deals. Since the raid, shootings have declined 34 percent but neighborhood residents and gang policing experts feel that the sweep didn't reduce gang crime or gang affiliation and anticipate more violence, citing historic tensions between the developments and institutionalized racism as motivations behind the bust.

== Notable residents ==
- Tamika Mallory (1980–), Activist and co-president of the 2019 Women's March
- Joe V. Nash (1919 – 2005), Dancer and choreographer

== See also ==
- New York City Housing Authority
- List of New York City Housing Authority properties
