= Real-time crime center =

Police facility using technology to monitor and respond to crimes in real time

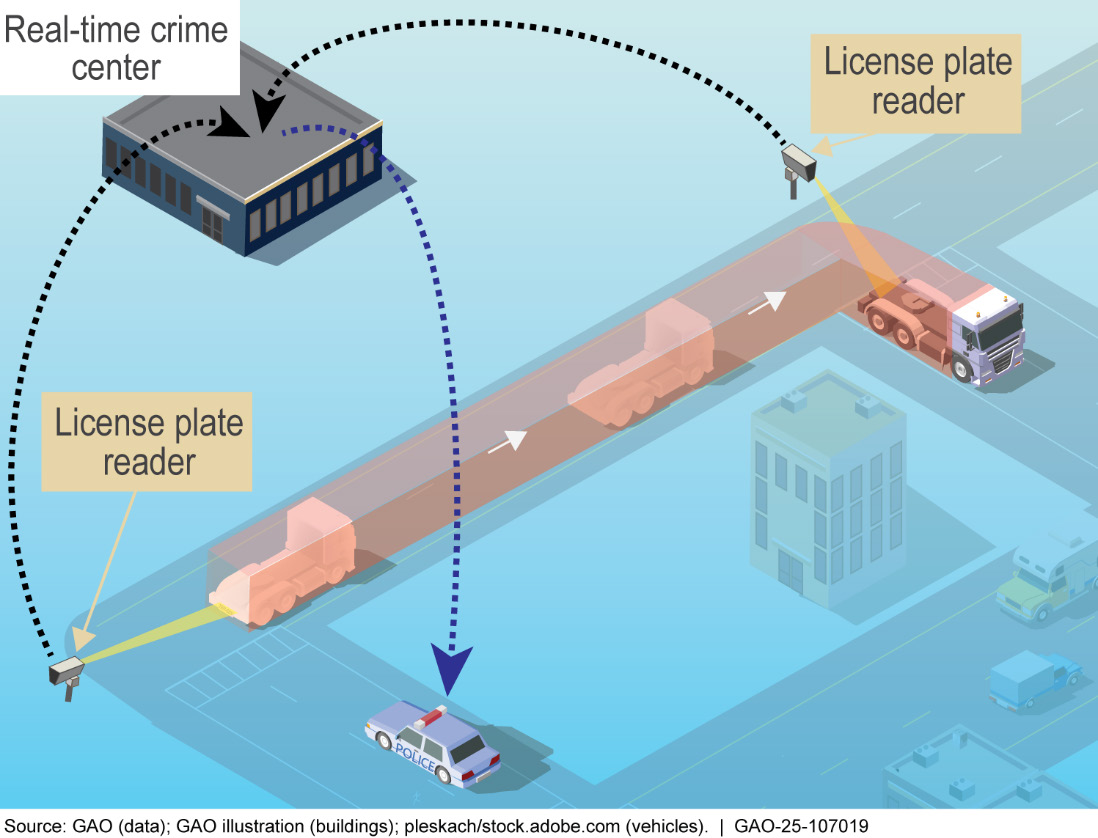
An illustration of how a RTCC can be connected to local license plate readers in a 2025 GAO report

Real-time crime centers (RTCCs) are agencies used to centralize technology use by law enforcement and emergency first responders. During early adoption, the primary purpose of RTCC was to give field officers and detectives instant information to help identify patterns and stop emerging crime. Through cloud computing, RTCCs try to offer enhanced visibility, unified awareness, and the appropriate level of response in emergency resource deployment via instant-live video, live feed camera docking, virtual incident location mapping and full integration with computer-aided dispatch (CAD).

== Operations ==
RTCCs unify live video and data feeds to create a central hub that enhances the situational awareness and investigative capabilities of law enforcement and public safety agencies.

== Early adoption ==
NYPD Real Time Crime Center emblem

The NYPD RTCC opened on July 18, 2005, and provides support 24/7. The center was built at a cost of $11 million. The information in the center is available to the 37,000 police officers of the New York City Police Department. The RTCC was funded in part by grants from the non-profit New York City Police Foundation.

RTCC data sources include a data warehouse in which billions of records are made available to detectives and other officers within minutes, instead of days or weeks. These include:

- More than 5 million New York State criminal records, parole and probation files,
- More than 20 million New York City criminal complaints, arrests, 911/311 calls and summonses spanning five years,
- More than 31 million national crime records,
- More than 33 billion public records.

The crime center employs satellite imaging and mapping of New York City (using geographic information system software) precinct-by-precinct. The link analysis capacity of the RTCC can track suspects to their known addresses and point detectives to the locations where they are most likely to flee. The Real Time Crime Center was built with the oversight of provider Dimension Data.

== List of RTCCs ==
Police departments that have real-time crime centers include:

- Camden County Police Department
- New York Police Department
- Miami-Dade Police Department
- Seattle Police Department
- Fort Worth Police Department
- Metropolitan Police Department, City of St. Louis
- Cobb County Police Department
- Baton Rouge Police Department
- Albuquerque Police Department
- Austin Police Department,
- Tampa Police Department
- Charlotte-Mecklenburg Police Department
- Modesto Police Department
- Fresno Police Department
- Minneapolis Police Department
- New Orleans Police Department
- Houston Police Department.

== See also ==
- Emergency operations center
- Closed-circuit television
- Tactical operations center
- Mass surveillance industry
- Surveillance capitalism
- Smart city
