= Police memorabilia collecting =

Hobby of collecting law enforcement items

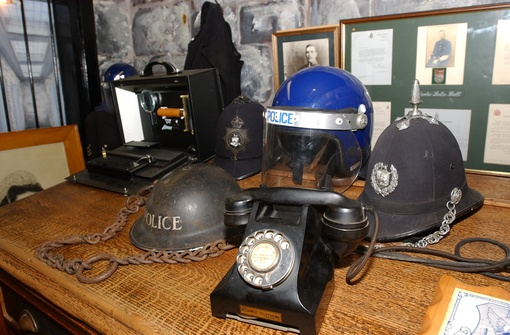
A collection of old Coventry City Police equipment, including helmets and an old telephone

Police memorabilia collecting is a hobby involving the collection and trading of law enforcement-related items such as patches, badges, uniforms, equipment, hats, helmets, training manuals, medals, and decommissioned or restored police cars.^{[a]} Memorabilia generally focuses on collecting historical artifacts such as turn-of-the-century screw-based handcuffs, though it can also include collecting modern items, typically those that have been decommissioned.

== The National Police Collectors Show ==
The National Police Collectors Show is an annual event that is held in different cities throughout the United States. It hosts collectors, dealers, and displays from around the world. The first show was held in California in 1985 and the most recent show was held in St. Charles, Missouri in July 2026. Jacksonville, Florida has been selected to host the 2027 show.

== Museums ==
Police museums display memorabilia related to a local police department or the history of law enforcement or emergency services in an area.

== See also ==
- Patch collecting
- Police rank
- Souvenir
- United States law enforcement decorations
