= Juanita N. Holmes =

African American police officer and administrator

Commissioner of the New York City Department of Probation
- Incumbent
- Assumed office March 9, 2023
- Mayor: Eric Adams
- Preceded by: Ana Bermúdez

Chief of Training for the New York Police Department
- In office January 20, 2022 – March 9, 2023
- Commissioner: Keechant Sewell
- Preceded by: Kenneth E. Corey
- Succeeded by: Olufunmilola Obe

Chief of Patrol for the New York Police Department
- In office October 29, 2020 – January 19, 2022
- Commissioner: Dermot Shea; Keechant Sewell
- Preceded by: Fausto B. Pichardo
- Succeeded by: Kathleen O’Reilly

Personal details
- Education: Empire State College; St. Joseph's College (Brooklyn/Patchogue, New York); Columbia Business School

Juanita N. Holmes is an American retired police officer and administrator who is the Commissioner of the New York City Department of Probation. Prior to that role, Holmes was the Chief of the Training Bureau in the NYPD. Before the appointment of Keechant Sewell as New York City Police Commissioner on January 1, 2022, Holmes was the highest-ranking female in the NYPD.

The Patrol Services Bureau is the largest and most visible bureau in the NYPD, overseeing much of the department's uniformed officers on patrol.

== Career ==
Holmes started her career in law enforcement when she joined the NYPD's 101st Precinct, on patrol. She also served in the 81, 100, 103, 111, and 113 Precincts, also Police Service Areas 2 and 8, the Patrol Borough Bronx Investigations Unit, Housing Borough Bronx/Queens, Office of the Deputy Commissioner of Training, Domestic Violence Unit, and School Safety Division.

As the Commanding Officer of the Patrol Services Bureau, she oversaw the department's 77 precincts throughout the city. Holmes retired from the New York City Police Department in December 2025.

== Education ==
Holmes holds a Bachelor of Science degree in biology from St. Joseph's College (Brooklyn/Patchogue, New York), and is also a graduate of the Police Management Institute at Columbia University.

== Dates of rank ==
Sworn in as a Patrolwoman - 1987

Promoted to Sergeant – 1995

Promoted to Lieutenant - 2002

Promoted to Captain - 2007

Promoted to Deputy Inspector - 2009

Promoted to Inspector 2012

Promoted to Deputy Chief - 2014

Promoted to Assistant Chief - 2016

Promoted to Chief of Patrol - 2020
Reassigned to Chief of Training - 2022

Police appointments
Preceded by Fausto B. Pichardo	NYPD Chief of Patrol; 2020-2022	Succeeded by Kathleen O'Reilly
