= Fausto B. Pichardo =

Dominican American police officer and administrator

Chief of Patrol for the New York Police Department
- In office December 4, 2019 – October 29, 2020
- Appointed by: Dermot F. Shea
- Preceded by: Rodney K. Harrison
- Succeeded by: Juanita N. Holmes

Personal details
- Born: Dominican Republic
- Education: John Jay College; Marist College; FBI National Academy; Columbia Business School

Fausto B. Pichardo is a Dominican American police officer and administrator, and is the former Chief of Patrol Bureau in the NYPD. In this capacity he oversees some 22,000 uniformed police officers in New York City and is the first Dominican American to reach his position.

The Patrol Services Bureau is the largest and most visible bureau in the NYPD, overseeing a majority of the department's uniformed officers on patrol.

== Early life ==
Pichardo was born in the Dominican Republic, in a village called Dicayagua de Arriba. He immigrated to the United States when he was nine, and grew up on the Lower East Side and attended public schools.

== Career ==
Pichardo started his career in law enforcement as a patrolman in 1999 after graduating from the New York City Police Academy. He was the Executive Officer of the Patrol Services Bureau where he oversaw the department's 77 Precincts throughout the city. On October 13, 2020, Chief Pichardo announced and filed for retirement to take effect November, 2020.

== Education ==
Attended NYC High School for the Humanities. Chief Pichardo holds a Bachelor of Arts degree in Criminal Justice from John Jay College of Criminal Justice, and also a Masters of Public Administration degree in Government from Marist College. He is also a 2015 graduate of the Police Management Institute at Columbia University, and a 2008 graduate of the FBI National Academy at Quantico, Virginia.

== Dates of rank ==
Sworn in as a Patrolman - 1999

Promoted to Sergeant - 2005

Promoted to Lieutenant - 2008

Promoted to Captain - 2011

Promoted to Deputy Inspector - 2013

Promoted to Inspector 2015

Promoted to Assistant Chief - 2018

Promoted to Chief of Patrol - 2019

Police appointments
Preceded by Rodney K. Harrison	NYPD Chief of Patrol; 2019-2020	Succeeded by Juanita N. Holmes
