= Terence Monahan =

American law enforcement officer

Chief of the New York Police Department
- In office January 8, 2018 – March 30, 2021
- Appointed by: James P. O'Neill
- Preceded by: Carlos M. Gomez
- Succeeded by: Rodney K. Harrison

Chief of Patrol of the New York City Police Department
- In office September 30, 2016 – January 7, 2018
- Preceded by: Carlos M. Gomez
- Succeeded by: Rodney K. Harrison

Personal details
- Born: July 27, 1960 (age 66)
- Spouse: Diane Monahan
- Children: 3
- Education: Fordham University (BA)

Terence "Terry" Monahan is an American law enforcement officer who served as the chief of department for the New York Police Department from 2018 to 2021.

== Education ==
Monahan earned a Bachelor of Arts degree in liberal arts from the Fordham University.

== Career ==
Monahan joined the NYPD in January 1982, and began his career as a patrolman in the 41st Precinct in the Bronx. Later he became the executive officer of the 34th Precinct and commanding officer of the 34th, 46th, and 48th precincts and Narcotics Borough Manhattan North. Monahan also served as executive officer for Patrol Borough Bronx.

Monahan is an expert in crowd control and the management of police operations at major events. He directed police operations during the 2002 World Economic Forum, the 2004 Republican National Convention, the 2003 World Series and 2009 World Series at Yankee Stadium, as well as the 2013 Major League Baseball All-Star Game at Citi Field. During his 35 years of service with the department, Monahan has been honored 28 times for excellent police duty and eight times for meritorious police duty. His formal promotion to chief of patrol took place on September 19, 2016.

Monahan was featured on Cops in 1994.

=== Ranks ===
Sworn in as a Patrolman - 1982
Promoted to Sergeant - 1987
Promoted to Lieutenant - 1989
Promoted to Captain - 1992
Promoted to Deputy Inspector - 1994
Promoted to Inspector - 1998
Promoted to Deputy Chief - 2003
Promoted to Assistant Chief - 2014
Promoted to Chief of Patrol - 2016
Chief of Department 2018

== Personal life ==
Monahan has been married to his wife, Diane, for over 30 years. They have three children.

Police appointments
Preceded by Carlos M. Gomez	NYPD Chief of Patrol; 2016–2018	Succeeded by Rodney K. Harrison
Preceded by Carlos M. Gomez	NYPD Chief of Department; 2018	Succeeded by Rodney K. Harrison
