= Carlos M. Gomez =

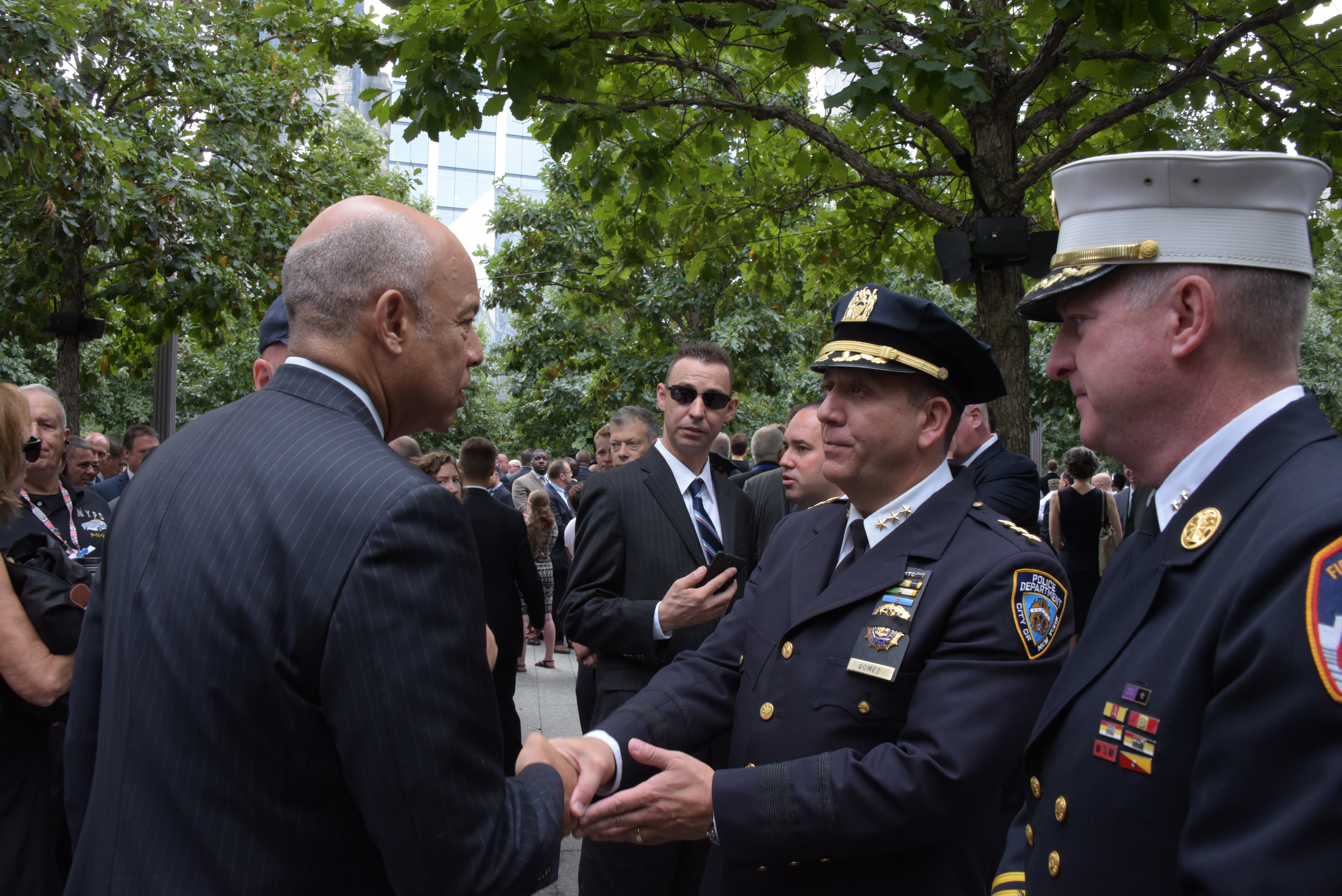
- Carlos M. Gomez (2nd from right) in 2016

Chief of the New York Police Department
- In office September 16, 2016 – December 28, 2017
- Appointed by: James P. O'Neill
- Preceded by: James P. O'Neill
- Succeeded by: Terence Monahan

Chief of Patrol of the New York City Police Department
- In office November 3, 2014 – September 16, 2016
- Preceded by: James P. O'Neill

Personal details
- Born: 1961 or 1962 (age 63–64) Cuba
- Education: State University of New York

Carlos M. Gomez (born 1961/62) is a former Chief of Department of the New York City Police Department. A native of Cuba who emigrated to the United States as a young boy with his father, Gomez grew up in the New York City borough of Queens. He was designated Chief of Department of the NYPD on September 16, 2016. The Chief of Department is the highest uniformed position, and Gomez was the 39th person to hold this post becoming the highest ranking Hispanic officer in the department.

== Education ==
Chief Gomez holds a B.A. in Criminal Justice from the State University of New York at Old Westbury.

== Career in the NYPD ==
Carlos M. Gomez joined the NYPD in July 1984 and began his career on patrol in the 103 Precinct. He was promoted to Sergeant in April 1989, Lieutenant in July 1996, Captain in August 1998, Deputy Inspector in September 2000, Inspector in December 2002, Deputy Chief in February 2007, Assistant Chief in March 2010, Chief of Housing in February 2014, Chief of Patrol in November 2014, and Chief of Department in August 2016. In November 2017 Chief Gomez announced his retirement.

Chief Gomez has served in the 101, 102, 103, 106 and 115 Precincts, as well as the Management Information Systems Division, Patrol Borough Queens North (PBQN), the Applicant Processing Division and the Street Crime Unit. He served as the Commanding Officer of Patrol Borough Bronx (PBBX) and as the Patrol Brough Queens North (PBQN) Adjutant. He has also commanded the Management Information Systems Division and the 90 and 106 Precincts. He served as Executive Officer of Patrol Borough Queens North (PBQN), as well as the 101, 102 and 103 Precincts. He was the Chief of Housing from February 2014-November 2014 and most recently served as Chief of Patrol from November 2014-August 2016. He was sworn in as Chief of Department, the highest ranking uniformed officer, on September 19, 2016.

== Promotion to Chief of Department ==
The formal promotion to Chief of Department took place on September 19, 2016.

== Dates of rank ==
Sworn in as a Patrolman - 1984
Promoted to Sergeant - 1989
Promoted to Lieutenant - 1996
Promoted to Captain - 1998
Promoted to Deputy Inspector - 2000
Promoted to Inspector - 2002
Promoted to Deputy Chief - 2007
Promoted to Assistant Chief - 2010
Promoted to Chief of Housing - 2014
Promoted to Chief of Patrol - November 2014
Chief of Department 2016

Police appointments
Preceded by James P. O'Neill	NYPD Chief of Department; 2016-2017	Succeeded by Terence Monahan
