= James P. O'Neill =

American police officer

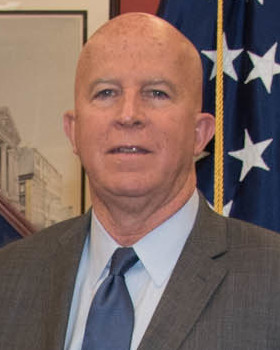

43rd Police Commissioner of New York City
- In office September 16, 2016 – November 30, 2019
- Mayor: Bill de Blasio
- Preceded by: William Bratton
- Succeeded by: Dermot Shea

Chief of the New York City Police Department
- In office November 3, 2014 – September 16, 2016
- Appointed by: William Bratton
- Mayor: Bill de Blasio
- Preceded by: Philip Banks III
- Succeeded by: Carlos M. Gomez

Chief of Patrol of the New York City Police Department
- In office June 2014 – November 3, 2014
- Preceded by: James Hall
- Succeeded by: Carlos M. Gomez

Personal details
- Born: James Patrick O'Neill Jr. 1957 or 1958 (age 68–69)
- Children: 2
- Education: John Jay College

James Patrick "Jimmy" O'Neill Jr. is an American police officer who served as the 43rd Police Commissioner of New York City from September 2016 until November 2019. Prior to his appointment as Police Commissioner, O'Neill served as the NYPD's Chief of Department, the highest uniformed position in the department, from 2014 to 2016.

In a meeting with Mayor Bill de Blasio on October 31, 2019, O'Neill confirmed his intentions to depart the NYPD. On November 4, 2019, it was publicly announced that Dermot F. Shea would become the 44th Commissioner of the NYPD in a ceremony at 1 Police Plaza on December 1, 2019.

On November 6, 2019, O'Neill announced that he had accepted a position as Senior Vice President of Physical Security for the payments firm Visa. On April 1, 2020, it was announced that O'Neill would be appointed as an advisor to the New York City government on COVID-19.

== Early life and education ==
O'Neill was born to an Irish American family, the fourth of seven children, to Helen and Joseph O'Neill. He was raised in the East Flatbush neighborhood of Brooklyn. He holds a Bachelor of Arts degree in Government and a Master of Public Administration degree from John Jay College in New York City.

== Career ==
O'Neill joined the New York City Transit Police in 1983 and began his career as a patrolman in Transit District 1. He was promoted to Sergeant in September 1987 and to Lieutenant in April 1991. In 1995, the transit police were merged into the NYPD. In 1997, he was promoted to Captain. Additional promotions were to Deputy Inspector in December 2001, to Inspector in August 2003, and to Deputy Chief in October 2005. On June 2, 2014, O'Neill was promoted to Chief of Patrol. Several months later, in November 2014, he was promoted to Chief of Department. In September 2016, he became police commissioner. On November 4, 2019, O'Neill resigned his post as Police Commissioner (effective early December 2019) and was replaced by former Chief of Detectives Dermot Shea.

=== Promotion to Chief of Department ===
On October 28, 2014, O'Neill became the Chief of Department for the NYPD's 36,000 uniformed officers, the highest-ranking uniformed position.

=== Police commissioner ===
On August 2, 2016, O'Neill was appointed Police Commissioner of New York City by Mayor Bill de Blasio, effective September 2016. O'Neill was succeeded as Chief of Department by Carlos M. Gomez. On November 4, 2019, O'Neill announced his retirement as commissioner, and was replaced by former Chief of Detectives Dermot F. Shea at month-end.

=== Vapor wake canines ===
O'Neill widely deployed vapor wake canines in the city. The dogs alert their handlers to the presence of explosives and track the scent to potential bombers.

Police appointments
Preceded by Bill Bratton	Police Commissioner of New York City; 2016–2019	Succeeded by Dermot F. Shea
Preceded by Philip Banks III	NYPD Chief of Department; 2014–2016	Succeeded by Carlos M. Gomez
