= 100 Blacks in Law Enforcement Who Care =

New York City advocacy group created to deal with police brutality

- Nickname: 100 Blacks
- Established: 1995; 31 years ago
- Founders: Eric Adams
- Founded at: New York City
- Purpose: activism
- Headquarters: New York City
- Location: New York City, United States
- Region served: New York City
- Services: Advocates for better interaction between the African American community and the New York City Police Department
- Fields: law enforcement

100 Blacks In Law Enforcement Who Care (or 100 Blacks) is an American New York City-based advocacy group which focuses on fighting injustices between the African American community and their interactions with the New York City Police Department (NYPD). This internal relations advocacy group speaks out against police brutality, racial profiling and police misconduct. They are composed of active duty and retired employees from within the department. They also support the black community with financial, educational and legal support.

== History ==
100 Blacks was founded in 1995 by a number of black police, correction, parole, probation and other members of law enforcement agencies, including Eric Adams, Kelvin Alexander, Vernon Wells, Julian Harper, Marq Claxton, Cliff Hollingsworth, Graham Weatherspoon, and Noel Leader, in order to address relations between the NYPD and the black community.

In 2013, Adams stepped down as spokesperson to become the first African American borough president of Brooklyn. He would eventually be elected Mayor of New York City. Following Eric Adams, Marq Claxton assumed the role as spokesperson for the organization. Most members of the group are retired from their law enforcement agencies while remaining members of 100 Blacks.

== Relationship with NYPD ==
While 100 Blacks is not recognized by the NYPD, they continue to work to advance their mission. In 2002, the New York Civil Liberties Union, 100 Blacks and the Latino Officers Association wrote to Police Commissioner Raymond Kelly and Hector Gonzalez, the chairman of the Civilian Complaint Review Board (CCRB), to address allegations of misconduct involving 120 officers during January 2000 and June 2001. In addition there were further backlogs from 1998 to 1999 on reports of 18 additional police conduct complaints. CCRB data indicated that most cases of misconduct remained open at the department resulting from long delays from the NYPD. The reason stems from the police department disbanding the unit within the Advocate's office which prosecutes cases referred to the NYPD sustained by the CCRB.

Further discord between the 100 Blacks and the NYPD came to a head in 2003 when the advocate organization took the NYPD to federal court alleging the NYPD violated their rights by illegal wiretapping and biased investigations. 100 Blacks alleged the NYPD subpoenaed Verizon requesting certain telephone numbers. The case was later thrown out by the judge who stated the allegations were "baseless" and the suit was "totally miscast".

In 2014, members of 100 Blacks held a vigil for Rafael Ramos and Wenjian Liu, who were shot while sitting in their police cars.

== Current Activities ==
In 2016, 100 Blacks teamed up with NYPD officer Edwin Raymond to combat quota based policing which requires officers to meet numerical goals for summons given and arrests made each month. The lawsuit made against the department by Raymond and 11 other officers said the department "violated a 2010 state ban against quotas and the 14th amendment which outlaws racial discrimination". They continue to support those who feel wronged by the NYPD, offering legal and financial advice.
