= Rodney K. Harrison =

American police officer and administrator

Commissioner of the Suffolk County Police Department
- In office December 31, 2021 – December 15, 2023
- Appointed by: Steve Bellone
- Preceded by: Geraldine Hart
- Succeeded by: Kevin Catalina

Chief of the New York City Police Department
- In office March 30, 2021 – December 31, 2021
- Appointed by: Dermot Shea
- Preceded by: Terence Monahan
- Succeeded by: Kenneth Corey

Chief of Detectives of the New York City Police Department
- In office December 1, 2019 – March 29, 2021
- Preceded by: Dermot F. Shea
- Succeeded by: James W. Essig

Chief of Patrol of the New York City Police Department
- In office January 18, 2018 – November 30, 2019
- Preceded by: Terence Monahan
- Succeeded by: Fausto B. Pichardo

Personal details
- Born: February 25, 1969 (age 57)
- Education: Springfield College

Rodney K. Harrison (born February 25, 1969) is an American former police officer and administrator who served as the Police Commissioner of the Suffolk County Police Department. He previously served in the New York City Police Department where he achieved the highest uniform rank, Chief of Department.

Harrison is currently a Law Enforcement Contributor for national media. He is Founder and Managing Partner at Hall & Harrison, a consulting firm that specializes in law enforcement training, risk management, and active shooter preparedness.

He is a featured commentator for CBS News.

== Early life ==
Harrison grew up in the South Jamaica section of Queens and joined the NYPD in 1991 as a police cadet. He attended Benjamin N. Cardozo High School and went to Springfield College where he received his Bachelor of Science in Liberal Arts. Harrison was sworn in as a police officer on June 30, 1992, and graduated from the NYC Police Academy on January 12, 1993.

== Career ==
=== New York City Police Department ===
After graduating, he patrolled the 114th Precinct in Astoria, Queens. On September 21, 1995, while working as an undercover in Brooklyn North Narcotics Division, Harrison and his partner, Detective Mike Stoney, were involved in a dangerous encounter during a buy and bust operation in Bedford-Stuyvesant, Brooklyn. During the operation Harrison and Stoney were in a gun battle with a drug dealer at which time Stoney was shot and survived. Harrison was instrumental in all five individuals including the shooter being arrested. For their bravery, both Harrison and Stoney were awarded the NYPD's Departmental Combat Cross, the department's second highest honor for valor. Later that year, he was promoted to detective.

Harrison was named the Commanding Officer of the 28th and 32nd Precincts in Harlem. In 2014 he was selected by then Commissioner Bill Bratton to be second-in-command in Staten Island following the death in police custody of Eric Garner.

In January 2018 he was promoted to Chief of Patrol where he oversaw the implementation of the Neighborhood Policing Program.

In December 2019, Harrison was promoted to the position of the Chief of Detectives – the first black person to hold the role in the 175-year history of the NYPD.

In 2021, Harrison was promoted to Chief of Department, the highest-ranking uniform member of the department. Harrison announced his retirement from the NYPD in November 2021.

=== Suffolk County Police Department ===
In December 2021, Suffolk County Executive, Steve Bellone nominated Harrison to be the county's police commissioner. Harrison retired from the NYPD after a 30-year career as a result. On December 23, 2021, Suffolk County's legislature unanimously confirmed Harrison's nomination and thus cleared the path for his appointment. Harrison was sworn in as the Commissioner of the Suffolk County Police Department on Tuesday, January 11, 2022. He became the first black Police Commissioner in the Department's history.

During his tenure, Harrison led the high profile Gilgo Beach serial killings investigation, which culminated in the arrest of suspect Rex Heuermann, who later pled guilty to eight murders and was sentenced to life in prison.

He formed the task force that included law enforcement partners - the FBI, state police, district attorney, and sheriff’s department - in identifying and indicting a subject. He resigned from the position in December 2023.[15]

He details the hunt behind the search for the Gilgo Beach serial killer in his memoir, The Commissioner: From Street Cop to Top Cop in the NYPD. He has spoken out about the investigation on many national news shows and podcasts.

== Dates of rank ==
Sworn in as a Police Officer - 07/01/1992
Promoted to Detective - 1995
Promoted to Sergeant - 2000
Promoted to Lieutenant - 2005
Promoted to Captain - 2007
Promoted to Deputy Inspector - 2009
Promoted to Inspector - 2011
Promoted to Deputy Chief - 2014
☆☆ Promoted to Assistant Chief - 2016
☆☆☆ Promoted to Chief of Patrol - 2018
Promoted to Chief of Detectives - 2019
Chief of Department - 2021

Police appointments
Preceded by Terence Monahan	NYPD Chief of Patrol; 2018–2019	Succeeded by Fausto B. Pichardo
Preceded by Dermot F. Shea	NYPD Chief of Detectives; 2019-2021	Succeeded by James W. Essig
Preceded by Terence Monahan	NYPD Chief of Department; 2021–2021	Succeeded by Kenneth E. Corey
Preceded by Geraldine Hart	Suffolk County Police Commissioner; 2022–2023	Succeeded by Kevin Catalina
