= New York City Police Department Detective Bureau =

Bureau of the NYPD

Detective Bureau
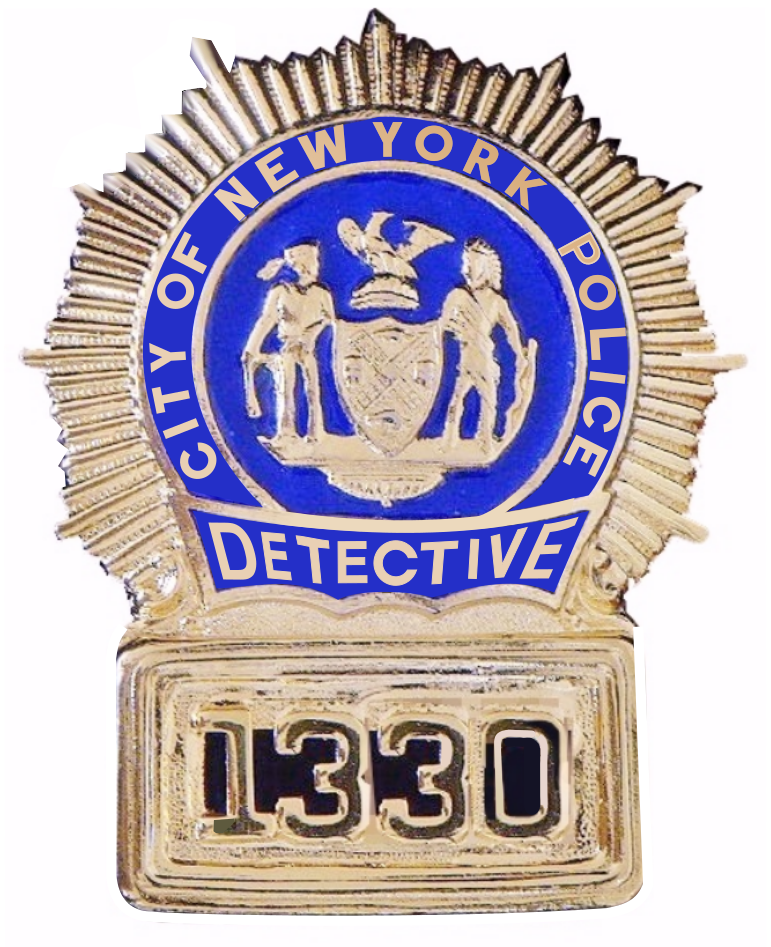
- Detective badge
- Active: 1882–present
- Country: United States
- Agency: New York City Police Department
- Type: Detective
- Abbreviation: DB

Structure
- Officers: Approx 5,400 (2024)

Commanders
- Current commander: Chief of Detectives Joseph E. Kenny

Website
- Official website

The Detective Bureau is one of several bureaus within the New York City Police Department (NYPD) and is headed by the three-star Chief of Detectives. The Detective Squad was formed in 1857 with the Detective Bureau later formed in 1882.

The Detective Bureau's responsibilities include the prevention, detection, and investigation of crime. In March 2016, the Organized Crime Control Bureau (OCCB) was disbanded with all investigative entities moved to the Detective Bureau.

There are two career "tracks" for detectives in the NYPD: Detective Investigators, and Detective Specialists.

Detective Investigators are the type of detective with which most members of the public are familiar, since they are portrayed frequently on movies and television. They are tasked primarily with the detection, prevention and investigation of criminal activity. They are typically assigned to investigative units, such as precinct detective squads, homicide, narcotics, intelligence, cold case and warrant squads.

Detective Specialists are a relatively new designation and one almost unique to the NYPD. It had its origins in the 1980's, when the union representing NYPD detectives objected that some officers were being designated as detectives to give them additional pay and status, but weren't being assigned to investigative duties. Examples included officers detailed as chauffeurs and bodyguards to the mayor, police commissioner and other high-ranking city officials.

To remedy this circumstance, the designation of "detective specialist" was created. These officers possess a unique or esoteric skill the department needs, such as sketch artist, helicopter instructor, scuba instructor, bomb technician, sharpshooter, and similar tasks.

All detectives start as Detective Investigators/Specialists. As they gain experience and seniority, they can be promoted to the grades of Detective II and Detective I (or "detective first"). While senior detectives can give direction to more junior members of their squads, all detectives, regardless of grade, are supervised by sergeants, lieutenants and captains assigned to their squads.

== Units of a precinct ==
=== Borough Commands ===
Each of the nine Detective Boroughs oversees all the precinct detective squads as well as the borough homicide squad and narcotics squad located within its command. Members of the Detective Bureau work closely with their counterparts in the Patrol Bureau to provide immediate investigations of crimes.

=== Special Victims Division ===
The Special Victims Division, created in 2003, oversees all the borough Special Victims Squads. The Special Victims Division is part of the Detective Bureau and primarily investigates sex crimes, including:

- Any child under 13 years of age that is the victim of any sex crime or attempted sex crime by any person.
- Any child under 11 years of age who is the victim of abuse by a parent or person legally responsible for the care of the child.
- Any victim of rape or attempted rape
- Any victim of a criminal sexual act or an attempted criminal sexual act
- Victims of aggravated sexual abuse
- Victims of sexual abuse in the first degree

Additional sub-units of the Special Victims Division are listed below:

- Sex Offenders Monitoring Unit (SOMU): Monitors all state-designated sex offenders to ensure they are in compliance.
- Special Victims Liaison Unit (SVLU): Provides educational lectures to community and advocacy groups, schools and medical institutions concerning public as well as personal safety.
- DNA tracking unit (DNATU): Tracks and coordinates all scientific evidence relating to investigations involving sexual assault.

A fictional version of the Special Victims Division called the Special Victims Unit appears in the television program Law & Order: Special Victims Unit.

=== Major Crimes ===
Major Crimes aka the major case squad are one of the eight squads, task forces, and teams in the Special Investigation Division – is located at One Police Plaza in Manhattan. It handles the following cases:

- Kidnappings as directed by the Chief of Detectives
- Burglary or attempted burglary of a bank or bank safe
- Bank robbery or attempted bank robbery by an unarmed perpetrator
- Burglary of a truck with contents worth more than $100,000
- Larceny of a truck with contents worth more than $100,000
- Truck hijacking
- All robberies in warehouse depots or similar locations where the object of the crime is a truck or its contents
- All commercial burglaries in which the value of the property stolen exceeds $100,000

The television program Law & Order: Criminal Intent features a fictional version of the Major Case Squad, which spends a majority of its time on high-profile murders—an area that the real Major Case Squad does not deal with. Ultimate responsibility for any homicide case in NYC rests with the precinct detective squad concerned, but the Major Case Squad has historically played a large and important role in the investigation of any homicide of an NYC police officer.

=== Crime Scene Unit ===
The Crime Scene Unit (CSU) is a part of the NYPD Detective Bureau's Forensic Investigations Division, responsible for forensic investigations of all homicides and sexual assaults, as well as other crimes as deemed necessary by an investigating supervisor. Members of the Crime Scene Unit assist the precinct detectives in the processing of a crime scene as well as determining the proper routing of evidence between the Medical Examiner's office, the NYPD Police Lab and the NYPD Property Clerk.

The Crime Scene Unit is composed of NYPD detectives (or occasionally police officers that are awaiting their promotion to detective), not civilian technicians like crime scene units in other parts of the United States. Generally these detectives come from an Evidence Collection Team which is operated at the borough level.

The Crime Scene Unit covers all of the boroughs of New York City, but is staffed with fewer than 1% of the total number of detectives in the NYPD. These detectives are dedicated to doing what is necessary to ensure that the precinct detectives and the District Attorney have as much evidence to identify the perpetrator of the crime and convict them at trial.

The Crime Scene Unit has at its disposal many tools to process a crime scene including the materials needed to develop fingerprints, cast footwear and tire impressions, follow the trajectory of bullets fired through windows and the chemicals necessary to observe blood under special lighting conditions that would otherwise be invisible to the naked eye. The unit is also trained to process a crime scene in a hazardous environment, for example following a nuclear, biological or chemical attack.

Fictional versions of the Crime Scene Unit appears frequently in many television series and movies set in New York City, most notably in a majority of the Law & Order franchise as well as in CSI: New York and Castle (TV series).

=== Central Robbery Division ===
The Central Robbery Division deploys five Borough Robbery Squads (Bronx, Manhattan, Brooklyn, Queens and Staten Island) staffed by seasoned detectives to investigate serious robbery cases. Such cases include borough and citywide robbery patterns and all home invasion robberies. This division is the lead investigative unit for all planned or anticipated robberies within New York City and has a Joint Robbery Task Force in which members work in tandem with the ATF, FBI and U.S. Marshals.

The division is led by a Deputy Chief (one star) and has two Captains as Zone Commanders. Each individual squad is staffed with a Lieutenant as the Commanding Officer and Sergeants to run teams of Detectives. Each of the detectives assigned are from investigative backgrounds such as Precinct Detective Squads, Narcotics, Street Crime Units, Firearm Investigative Squads and Fugitive Enforcement Squads.

== Organization ==
Overall command is the Detective Bureau

- Chief of Detectives – Chief Joseph E. Kenny
- Executive Officer Detective Bureau –

Units within the Detective Bureau include the:

- Detective Borough Commands
  - Manhattan South Detectives
  - Manhattan North Detectives
  - Bronx South Detectives
  - Bronx North Detectives
  - Brooklyn South Detectives
  - Brooklyn North Detectives
  - Queens South Detectives
  - Queens North Detectives
  - Staten Island Detectives
- Central Investigation and Resource Division
  - Hostage Negotiation Team
  - Homicide Analysis Unit
  - Photographic Services
  - Crime Stoppers Unit
  - Training Unit
- Forensic Investigation Division
  - Crime Scene Unit
  - Police Laboratory
  - DNA Liaison Unit
  - Latent Print Unit
  - Ballistics Unit
  - Bomb Squad Commander
- Fugitive Enforcement Division
  - Violent Felony Apprehension Squad
  - Regional Fugitive Task Force (NYPD, USMS)
  - Juvenile Crime Squad
  - Warrant Section
- Special Investigation Division
  - Surveillance and Apprehension Squad
  - Animal Cruelty Investigation Squad
  - Joint Robbery Apprehension Team
  - Arson and Explosion Squad
  - Hate Crimes Task Force
  - Missing Persons Squad
  - Major Case Squad
  - Cold Case Squad
- Head of the Special Victims Division
  - Cold Case Special Victims Squad
  - Borough Special Victims Squads
  - Transit Special Victims Squads
  - Sex Offender Monitoring Unit
  - Special Victims Liaison Team
  - DNA Tracking Unit
- Central Robbery Division
  - Transit Robbery Borough Squads
  - Robbery Borough Squads
  - Joint Robbery Task Force- SPARTA (NYPD, ATF, USM)
  - Surveillance Teams
- Grand Larceny Division
  - BLAST – Burglary Larceny Apprehension Surveillance Teams
  - Borough Grand Larceny Squads
  - Financial Crimes Task Force
  - Special Frauds Squad
- Other units
  - Gun Violence Suppression Division
  - Criminal Enterprise Division
  - Vice Enforcement Division
- Other units
  - Homicide Borough Squads
  - Narcotics Borough Squads
  - 5 District Attorney's Squads (one for each of the 5 District Attorney offices that cover NYC)

=== List of chief detectives ===
Name	Dates in Office
George P. Mitchell	1947–1949
William T. Whalen	1949–1950
Conrad H. Rothengast	1950–1951
George A. Loures	1951–1954
Thomas A. Nielsen	1954–1955
James B. Leggett	1955–1961
John F. Walsh	1961
Michael E.J. Ledden	1961–1963
Lawrence J. McKearney	1963–1964
Philip J. Walsh	1964–1966
Frederick M. Lussen	1966–1970
Albert A. Seedman	1971–1972
Louis C. Cottell	1972–1976
John L. Keenan	1977–1978
James T. Sullivan	1978–1984
Richard J. Nicastro	1984–1986
Robert Colangelo	1986–1989
Joseph R. Borelli	1989–1994
Charles Reuther	1994–1996
Patrick J. Kelleher	1996–1997
William H. Allee	1997–2003
George F. Brown	2003–2009
Phil T. Pulaski	2009–2014
Robert K. Boyce	2014–2018
Dermot F. Shea	2018–2019
Rodney K. Harrison	2019–2021
James W. Essig	2021–2023
Joseph E. Kenny	2023–present

== Popular culture ==
Over the years, NYPD Detectives have been fictionalized in television police procedurals such as Kojak, Barney Miller, Law & Order and five subsequent spin-offs, NYPD Blue, New York Undercover, CSI: NY, Castle, Blue Bloods, Brooklyn Nine Nine and many others.

== See also ==
- Federal Bureau of Investigation
