= Weihong Hu =

Chinese American hotel developer

- Born: China
- Occupation: real estate developer
- Known for: fraud scandal
- Criminal charges: fraud; bribery; money laundering; obstruction of justice

Weihong Hu is a Chinese American businesswoman based in New York City, United States, known for her involvement in the hotel industry. In 2024, she gained public attention after being indicated on charges related to fraud and bribery in connection with city-awarded contracts.

== Early life and career ==
Hu was born and raised in China. She originally worked as a food vendor, before moving to real estate.

According to The Guardian, Hu got into legal trouble in China for bribing a politician in 2007. A Chinese state website describes a real estate developer named Hu that bribed a politician beginning in 1996, while another Chinese government website reported that Weihong Hu confessed to bribery in 2007. Hu’s attorney states that the information on these sites may be incorrect.

Hu expanded her business into America in 2008. She established herself as a hotel developer in Queens, New York, where she owns multiple properties. Some of these hotels were contracted by the city to house formerly incarcerated individuals and vulnerable populations during the COVID-19 Pandemic.

== Fraud charges ==
Hu was charged with fraud, bribery, and money laundering in February 2025. The charges were for bribing nonprofit owner Julio Medina to give her company favorable contracts with a program that provided hotel rooms formerly incarcerated individuals.

Additionally, Hu and Medina were charged with obstruction of justice in September 2025 after it came out that they had attempted to conceal a Mercedes that Hu had given to Medina as a kickback.

Hu has also been accused, among other things, of bribing officials in the Eric Adams administration to ignore work safety violations on construction sites she owned and letting officials stay in hotel rooms meant for Medina’s nonprofit program.
