= Eric Adams =

Mayor of New York City from 2022 to 2025

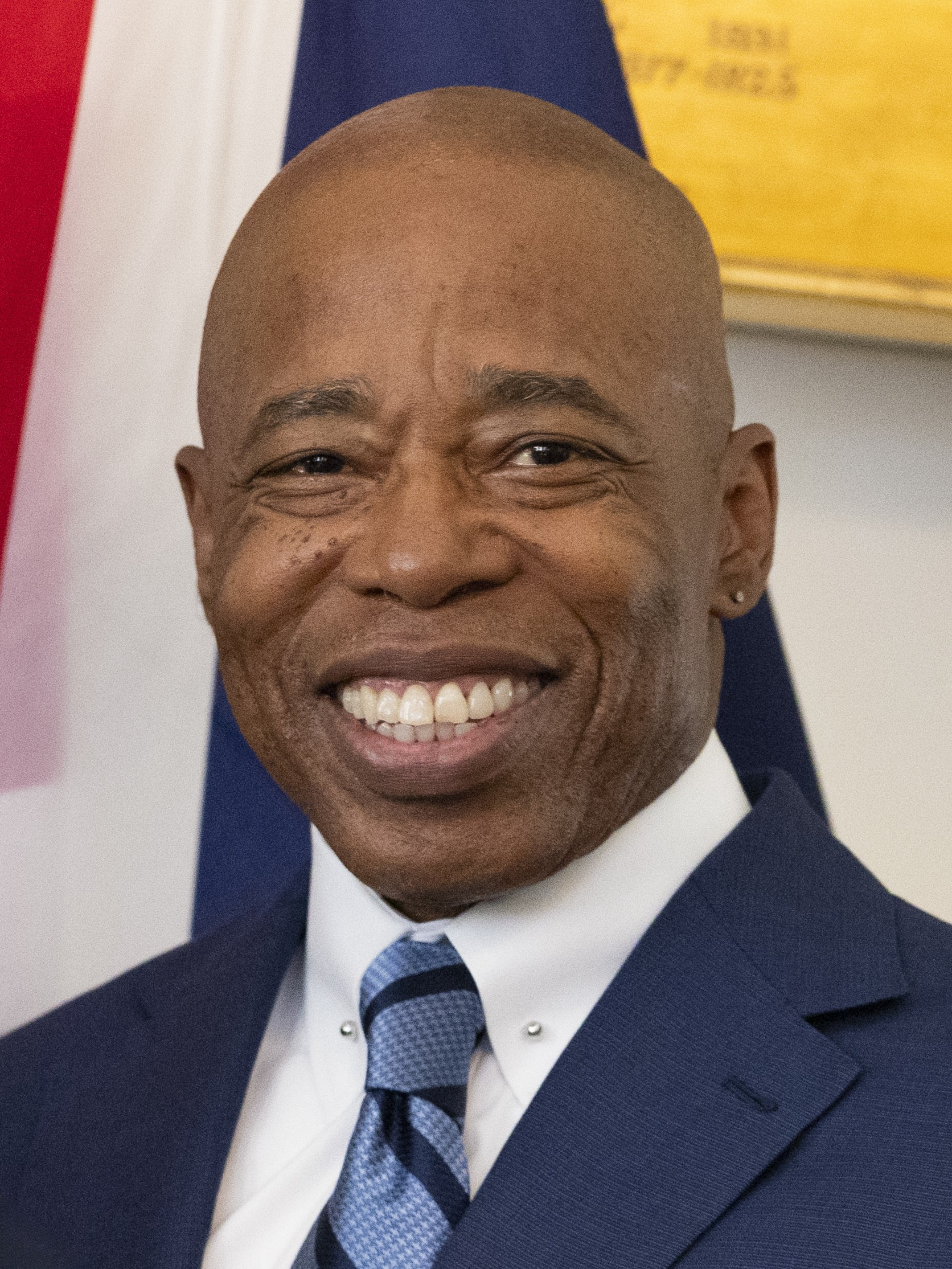
- Adams in 2023

111th Mayor of New York City
- In office January 1, 2022 – December 31, 2025
- First Deputy: List: Lorraine Grillo (2022); Sheena Wright (2023–2024); Anne Williams-Isom (acting; 2024); Maria Torres-Springer (2024–2025); Suzanne Miles-Gustave (acting; 2025); Camille Joseph Varlack (interim; 2025); Randy Mastro (2025)
- Preceded by: Bill de Blasio
- Succeeded by: Zohran Mamdani

18th Borough President of Brooklyn
- In office January 1, 2014 – December 31, 2021
- Deputy: Diana Reyna; Ingrid Lewis-Martin
- Preceded by: Marty Markowitz
- Succeeded by: Antonio Reynoso

Member of the New York State Senate from the 20th district
- In office January 1, 2007 – December 31, 2013
- Preceded by: Carl Andrews
- Succeeded by: Jesse Hamilton

Personal details
- Born: Eric Leroy Adams; September 1, 1960 (age 66) Brooklyn, New York, U.S.
- Citizenship: United States; Albania (since 2026)
- Party: Democratic (before 1997; since 2001) (Note: Adams sought re-election as mayor of New York in 2025 as an independent. However, he remained a registered Democrat throughout his campaign.)
- Other political affiliations: Republican (1997–2001)
- Domestic partner: Tracey Collins
- Children: 1
- Education: New York City College of Technology (AA); John Jay College of Criminal Justice (BA); Marist College (MPA)
- Police career
- Department: New York City Police Department
- Service years: 1984–2006
- Rank: Captain
- Adams's voice Adams on the death of Tyre Nichols; Recorded January 2023

Eric Leroy Adams (born September 1, 1960) is an American politician and former police officer who served as the 111th mayor of New York City from 2022 to 2025. A member of the Democratic Party, Adams was an officer in the New York City Transit Police and then the New York City Police Department (NYPD) for more than 20 years, retiring at the rank of captain. He served in the New York State Senate from 2006 to 2013, representing the 20th district in Brooklyn. In 2013, Adams became the first black American to be elected Brooklyn Borough President; he was re-elected in 2017.

In 2021, Adams received the Democratic Party's nomination for mayor of New York City after winning a crowded primary that used ranked-choice voting. In the general election, Adams won a landslide victory over Republican nominee Curtis Sliwa. As mayor, he took what is regarded to have been a tough-on-crime approach and reintroduced a plain-clothed NYPD unit that had been disbanded by the previous administration. He also implemented, alongside increased police presence, a zero-tolerance policy on homeless people sleeping in subway cars.

In September 2024, a series of investigations into Adams's administration intensified. Adams was indicted on federal charges of bribery, fraud, and soliciting illegal foreign campaign donations. Adams pleaded not guilty to the charges. He alleged that the charges were retaliation for opposing the Biden administration's handling of the city's 2020s migrant crisis. In February 2025, the Department of Justice in the Donald Trump administration instructed federal prosecutors to drop charges against Adams. Judge Dale Ho dismissed the case against Adams on April 2, 2025.

In April 2025, Adams announced that he would seek re-election as an independent in the 2025 New York City mayoral election. In September, he withdrew his candidacy following flagging poll numbers, endorsing Andrew Cuomo. Cuomo lost to Zohran Mamdani, who succeeded Adams as mayor on January 1, 2026. In April 2026, Adams became an honorary Albanian citizen by presidential decree.

== Early life and education ==
Eric Leroy Adams was born in Brownsville, Brooklyn, on September 1, 1960. He was the fourth of six children. His mother, Dorothy Mae Adams-Streeter (1938–2021), worked double shifts as a housecleaner and had received only a third-grade education. His father, Leroy Adams, was a butcher who struggled with alcoholism. Both of his parents moved to New York City from Alabama in the 1950s. Adams was raised in a rat-infested tenement in Bushwick, Brooklyn. His family was so poor that he often brought a bag of clothes to school with him in case of a sudden eviction from his home. As a young boy, he sometimes earned money as a squeegee boy. By 1968, his mother managed to save up enough money to buy a house and move the family to South Jamaica, Queens.

At age 14, Adams joined a gang, the 7-Crowns, and became known as "a tough little guy". He would hold money for local hustlers. He also ran errands, including purchasing groceries, for a dancer and part-time prostitute named Micki after she became injured. After Micki refused to pay for the groceries he purchased or his work, Adams and his brother stole her TV and a money order. The two were later arrested for criminal trespassing. While in police custody, they were allegedly beaten by NYPD officers until another cop intervened. Adams was sent to a juvenile detention center for a few days before being sentenced to probation. Adams had post-traumatic stress disorder after the incident and has said that the violent encounter motivated him to enter law enforcement. He was particularly intrigued by black police officers and by the "swagger" and "respect" that comes with being in law enforcement. Herbert Daughtry of The House of the Lord Pentecostal Church added to his motivation when he suggested that by joining the police force, he could aid in reforming police culture from within. Adams would later attend his church on occasion.

Adams graduated from Bayside High School in Queens in January 1979, but struggled to maintain good grades. He began attending college while working as a mechanic and a mailroom clerk at the Brooklyn District Attorney's office, receiving an associate degree from the New York City College of Technology, a bachelor's degree from the John Jay College of Criminal Justice, and an MPA from Marist College in 2006. Adams experienced an academic turnaround that he credits to a dyslexia diagnosis in college: "I went from a D student to the dean's list." As a result, he became a strong advocate for early dyslexia screening in public schools.

== Policing career (1984–2006) ==
Adams served as an officer in the New York City Transit Police and the New York City Police Department (NYPD) for 22 years. He has described his wanting to serve as a reaction to the abuse he suffered by the NYPD in his youth and separately stated that he was encouraged to join to lead reform from within. He attended the New York City Police Academy and graduated second in his class in 1984.

Adams started in the New York City Transit Police and continued with the NYPD when the transit police and the NYPD merged. He worked in the 6th Precinct in Greenwich Village, the 94th Precinct in Greenpoint, and the 88th Precinct covering Fort Greene and Clinton Hill. In 1986, white police officers raised their guns at Adams when he was working as a plainclothes officer; he was mistaken for a suspect. During the 1990s, Adams served as president of the Grand Council of Guardians, an African American patrolmen's association.

Adams worked with the Nation of Islam in the 1990s because of their work in patrolling crime-ridden housing projects. Adams met with their leader Louis Farrakhan and appeared on stage with him at an event. Adams also suggested that Mayor David Dinkins meet with Farrakhan and hire the Nation of Islam's security company to patrol housing projects. Adams's ties to Farrakhan—who has made antisemitic comments—received criticism in the New York Post.

In 1995, Adams served as an escort for Mike Tyson when he was released from jail following his rape conviction. That same year, in response to Rudy Giuliani's election as Mayor, he co-founded 100 Blacks in Law Enforcement Who Care, an advocacy group for black police officers that sought criminal justice reform and often spoke out against police brutality and racial profiling. The group also held tutorials that taught black male youth how to deal with the police if they are detained, which included turning on the car's dome light, putting their hands on the wheel and deescalating the situation. However, many activists, including Al Sharpton, criticized Adams's efforts, claiming that he was merely teaching young black people how to "live under oppression."

In 2006, Adams was put under surveillance and investigated by the NYPD for appearing on television in his official capacity as a police officer and critiquing Mayor Michael Bloomberg. Internal Affairs Bureau of the NYPD opened an investigation into this and charged Adams with disseminating misinformation, divulging official police business, and speaking as a representative of the department without permission. He retired from the police force with the rank of captain shortly after being found guilty for speaking in an official capacity.

== Early political career ==
In the 1990s, Adams began to eye a political career with the ultimate goal of becoming the Mayor of New York City. He spoke to William Lynch Jr., who was an advisor to Mayor David Dinkins, about a political career. Lynch encouraged Adams first to obtain a bachelor's degree, rise within the NYPD's ranks and successfully run for a lower political office.

During the 1993 mayoral election, Adams, a supporter of the incumbent David Dinkins, made a controversial comment about a candidate for New York State Comptroller, Herman Badillo. Adams said that if Badillo—who was Puerto Rican—were concerned about the Hispanic community, he would have married a Hispanic woman and not a white Jewish woman. These comments became a point of turmoil in the election. They caused controversy for Dinkins, who ultimately lost the election.

In 1994, Adams ran for Congress against incumbent Major Owens in the Democratic primary for New York's 11th congressional district, condemning Owens for denouncing Louis Farrakhan, but failed to receive enough valid signatures to make the ballot. Adams claimed his petition signatures had been stolen by someone on behalf of Owens, but police found no corroborating evidence.

Adams registered as a Republican in 1997 before switching back to the Democratic Party in 2001, according to the Board of Elections. Adams has said his switch to the Republican Party was a protest move against what he saw as failed Democratic leadership.

=== New York State Senate (2007–2013) ===
In 2006, Adams ran for the New York State Senate. He was elected and served four terms until 2013, when he was elected Brooklyn Borough President. He represented the 20th Senate District, which includes parts of the Brooklyn neighborhoods of Brownsville, Crown Heights, East Flatbush, Park Slope, Prospect Heights, and Sunset Park.

He placed billboards around parts of Brooklyn bemoaning pants sagging. He also published an instructional video to teach parents how to search their child's room for contraband. In the demonstration, Adams finds a crack pipe in a backpack, bullets behind a picture frame, and marijuana secreted inside of a doll. As a freshman state senator in 2007, he joined other legislators requesting a pay raise for New York's lawmakers, who had not received a raise since 1999. At the time, they ranked third-highest in pay among state lawmakers in the United States. During his speech on the floor supporting a pay raise for legislators, he said, "Show me the money."

In 2009, two New York State Senate Democrats aligned with Republicans, creating a standoff over who would be the Senate's next leader. Adams worked to foster a compromise to nominate John L. Sampson as the Minority Leader of the New York State Senate. That same year, Adams was one of 24 state senators to vote in favor of marriage equality in New York State. He spoke in support of the freedom to marry during the debate before the vote. After the bill failed to become law, he again voted to legalize same-sex marriage in New York in 2011. On July 24, 2011, New York's Marriage Equality Act came into effect.

In 2010, Adams became Chair of the Senate Racing and Wagering Committee and was praised for his engagement. He would spend hours traveling and visiting racetracks to study the issue further. He came under investigation for his handling of choosing an operator to run the gambling operation at the Aqueduct Racetrack in Queens. A report conducted by the state inspector general was critical of Adams's judgment as he leaked information on the bidding process, fundraised from potential bidders, and attended the victory celebration of the company awarded the contract. The matter was referred to the United States Department of Justice, but it took no action. Adams admitted no wrongdoing, calling the report a "political hit piece".

In February 2010, Adams was one of just eight members of the New York Senate who voted not to expel Senator Hiram Monserrate from the legislature after he was convicted of assault for dragging his girlfriend down a hallway and slashing her face with a piece of glass.

Adams was a vocal opponent of the NYPD's "stop and frisk" policy, which predominantly affected young black and Latino men, and which, in 2000, the U.S. Commission on Civil Rights said constituted racial profiling. In 2011, he supported calling for a federal investigation into stop-and-frisk practices. He championed a bill to stop the NYPD from gathering data about individuals who had been stopped but not charged.

In 2012, Adams served as co-chair of New York's State Legislators Against Illegal Guns. Adams and five other state lawmakers wore hooded sweatshirts in the legislative chamber on March 12, 2012, in protest of the shooting of Trayvon Martin, a Florida teen who was killed by another civilian, George Zimmerman.

=== Brooklyn borough president (2013–2021) ===
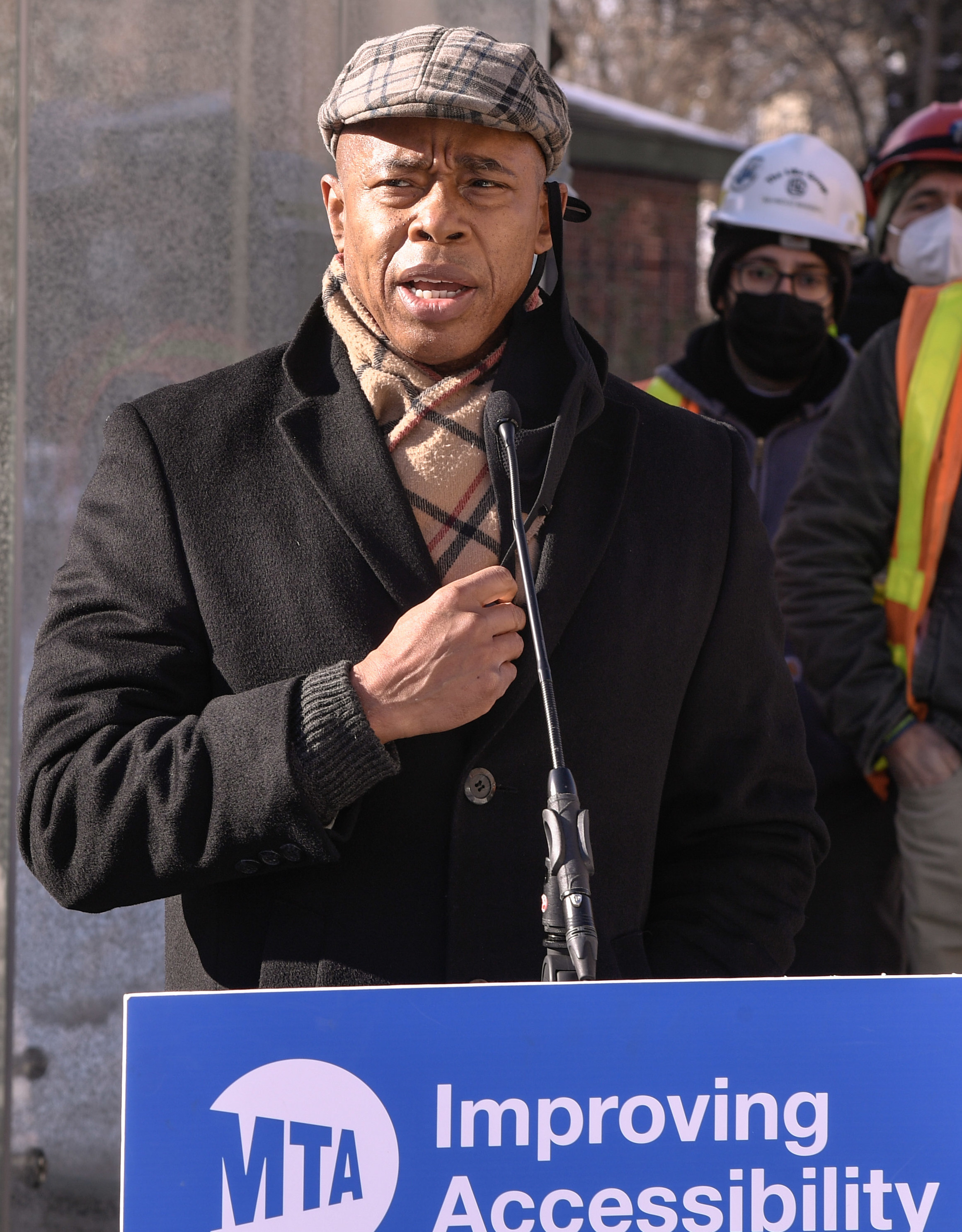
Adams in 2020

On November 5, 2013, Adams was elected Brooklyn Borough President with 90.8 percent of the vote, more than any other candidate for borough president in New York City that year. In 2017, he was elected with 83.0 percent of the vote. In both of his campaigns, he was unopposed in the Democratic primaries.

Under the New York City Charter, borough presidents must submit Uniform Land Use Review Procedure (ULURP) recommendations on certain uses of land throughout their borough. Adams used his ULURP recommendations to propose additional permanently affordable housing units in the rezoning of East New York; the relocation of municipal government agencies to East New York to reduce density in Downtown Brooklyn and create jobs for community residents; and the redevelopment of 25 Kent Avenue in Williamsburg as manufacturing space, with increased property taxes directed to the acquisition of the remaining proposed sections of Bushwick Inlet Park and their development as a community resource.

Based on a report prepared by the Independent Budget Office of New York City (IBO) at his request, Adams urged the City University of New York (CUNY) system to explore reinstating free tuition for two-year community colleges, which could improve graduation rates and lead to increased earnings potential and taxpayer contribution, as well as expand access to higher education. Adams advocated for making two-year CUNY colleges free.

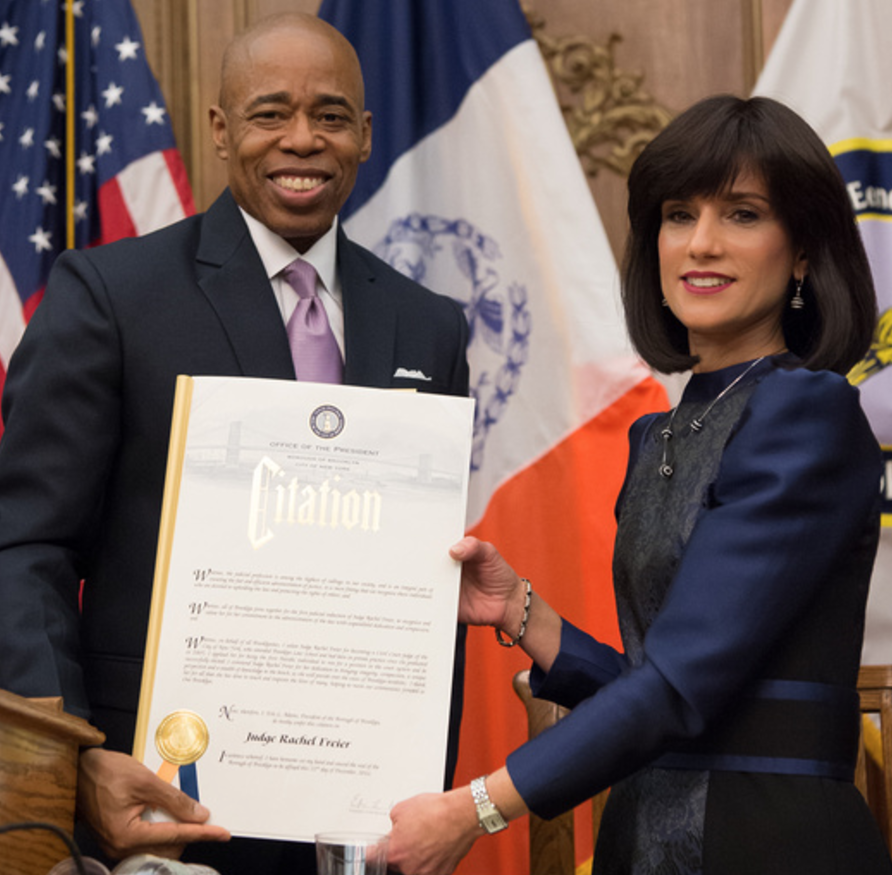
Adams with Judge Rachel Freier in 2016

Adams introduced a bill in the New York City Council that would require all municipal buildings providing services to the public to have lactation rooms. The council passed the bill on July 14, 2016.

After Adams received a personal diagnosis of type two diabetes in 2016, he adopted and began advocating for policies that would promote a plant-based diet and healthier lifestyle. The Office of the Brooklyn Borough President launched a plant-based nutrition page on its website with links to resources encouraging vegan and plant-based lifestyles and printable handouts produced by the borough. Adams urged the City Council to pass a resolution called "Ban the Baloney", aiming for schools across the city to stop serving processed meats. He also avidly supported "Meatless Mondays" in public schools. In 2021, Adams authorized a grant from the borough to SUNY Downstate College of Medicine to establish a plant-based supplemental curriculum.

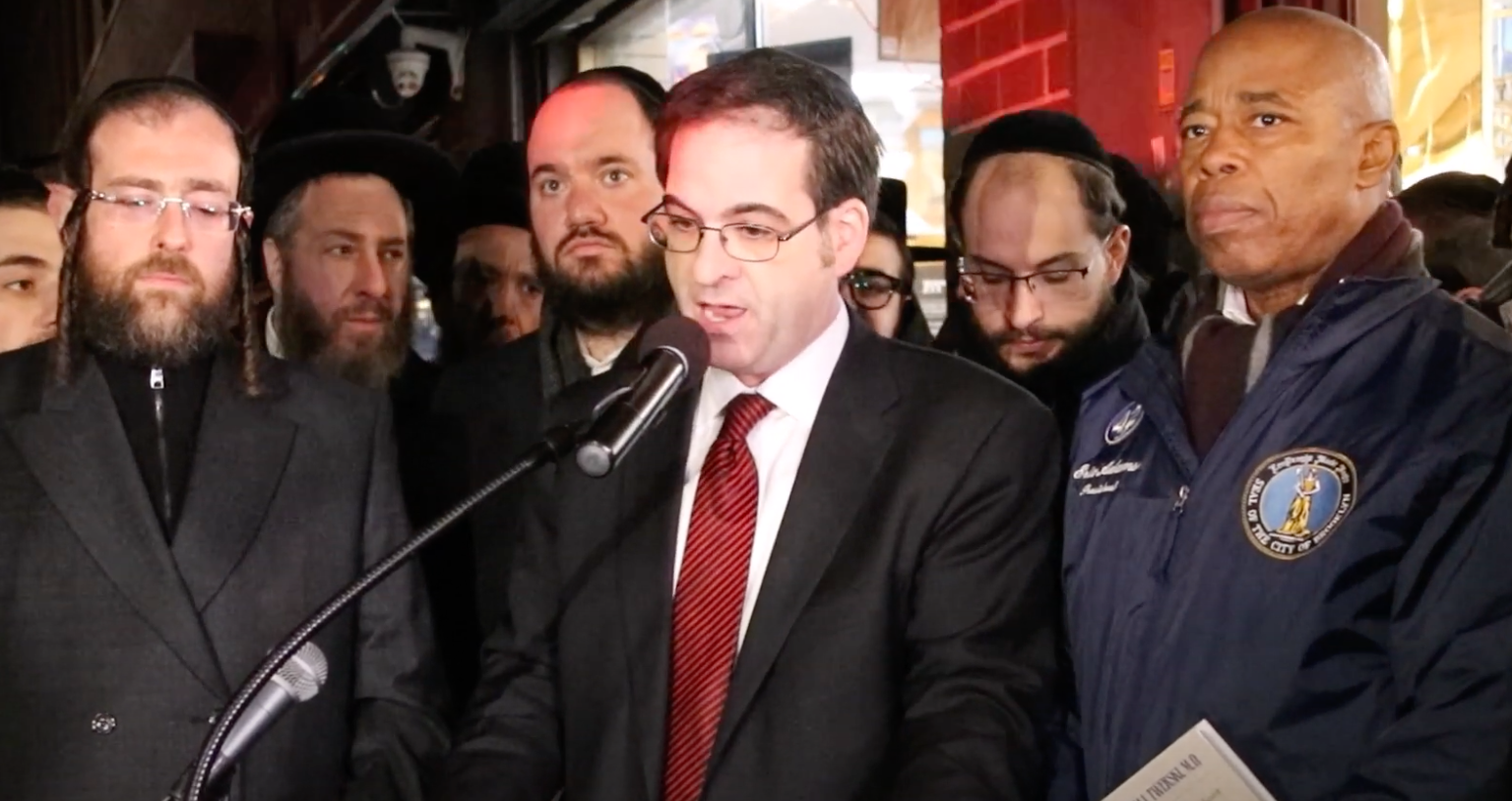
Adams with Councilmember Kalman Yeger and members of the Jewish community after the 2019 Jersey City shooting

Adams criticized the use of excessive force in the arrest of Eric Garner, who died after being placed in a chokehold prohibited by NYPD regulations, and the arrest of postal carrier Glen Grays, who was determined not to have committed any crime or infraction. After the 2014 killings of NYPD officers Wenjian Liu and Rafael Ramos, Adams wrote an editorial for the New York Daily News calling on police officers and the community to work with each other to build a relationship of mutual respect.

Following the school shooting at Marjory Stoneman Douglas High School in Parkland, Florida on February 14, 2018, Adams joined the efforts of Brooklyn students by organizing an emergency meeting at Brooklyn Borough Hall and a rally in Prospect Park to demand stricter gun laws. That same month, after a correctional officer endured a beating from six inmates at the George Motchan Detention Center on Rikers Island, Adams stood outside the Brooklyn Detention Center to express his support to reinstate solitary confinement in prisons.

In 2014, Adams established the One Brooklyn Fund, a nonprofit organization for community programs, grant writing, and extolling local businesses. Critics characterized it as serving as a conduit for Adams's public profile and allowing non-campaign "pay to play" contributions from developers and lobbyists. Adams's office was investigated twice by the city Department of Investigation (DOI) over One Brooklyn's fundraising. The first investigation was in 2014 when potential attendees were asked if they would provide "financial support" to One Brooklyn. In 2016, the DOI found that Adams's office had mistakenly licensed the use of Brooklyn Borough Hall for a Mayor's Office event.

== 2021 mayoral campaign ==
Adams had long been mulling a run for New York mayor, and on November 17, 2020, he announced his candidacy for Mayor of New York City in the 2021 election. He was a top fundraiser among Democrats in the race, second only to Raymond McGuire regarding the amount raised.

Adams ran as a moderate Democrat, and his campaign focused on crime and public safety. He has argued against the "defund the police" movement and in favor of police reform. Public health and the city's economy were cited as his campaign's other top priorities. Initiatives promoted in his campaign include "an expanded local tax credit for low-income families, investment in underperforming schools, and improvements to public housing."

On November 20, 2020, shortly after formally announcing his run for mayor of New York City, Adams attended an indoor fundraiser with 18 people in an Upper West Side restaurant during the COVID-19 pandemic, drawing criticism. He held an already scheduled fundraiser the following day in Queens, when a 25-person limit on mass gatherings was in place. Adams's campaign said that there were eight people at the event and that they were required to wear masks and practice social distancing.

While Adams opposed NYPD's "stop and frisk" policy, during his State Senate tenure, he supported it during his 2021 mayoral campaign. In February 2020, Adams said that "if you have a police department where you're saying you can't stop and question, that is not a responsible form of policing". For much of the race, Adams trailed entrepreneur Andrew Yang in public polling. However, Adams's standing in the polls grew stronger in May. He emerged as the frontrunner in the final weeks of the election. In the months leading up to the election, crime rose in New York, which may have benefited Adams, a former police officer, who ran as a tough-on-crime candidate.

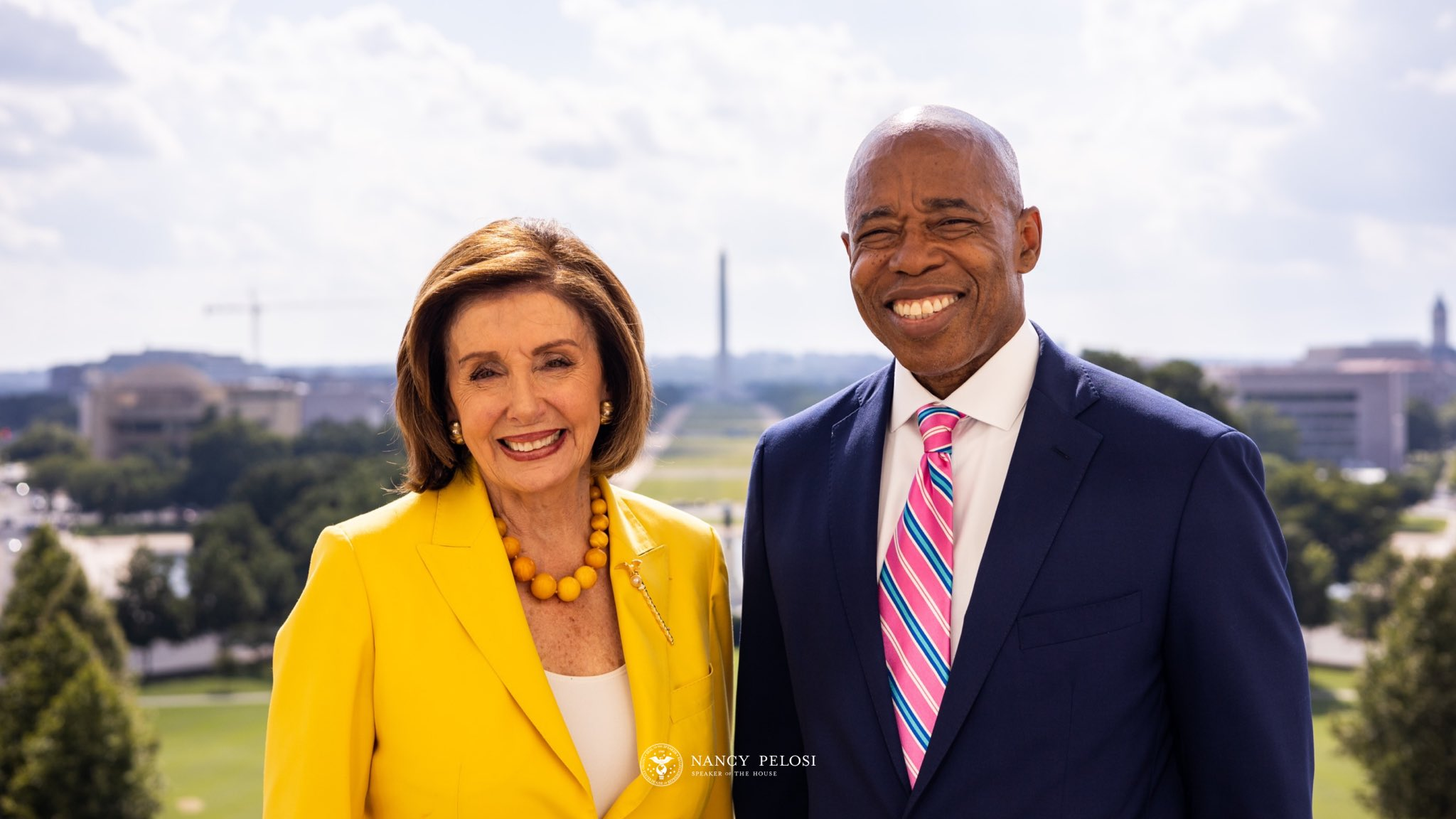
Adams with House Speaker Nancy Pelosi on July 12, 2021

While running for office, Adams faced scrutiny from several media outlets regarding his residency. Adams and his partner, Tracey Collins, own a co-op in Fort Lee, New Jersey near the George Washington Bridge, where some critics allege he actually resides.

On July 6, Adams completed a come-from-behind victory and was declared the winner of the Democratic primary, ahead of Kathryn Garcia, Maya Wiley, Andrew Yang, and others, in New York's first major race to use ranked-choice voting.

Following his primary victory, Adams hosted a series of political fundraisers in The Hamptons and Martha's Vineyard and vacationed in Monte Carlo, which critics contended contradicted his message of being a "blue-collar" mayor.

Adams faced Republican Curtis Sliwa in the general election and was heavily favored to prevail. He was elected in a landslide on November 2, 2021.

== Mayor of New York City (2022–2025) ==
=== Mayoral transition ===
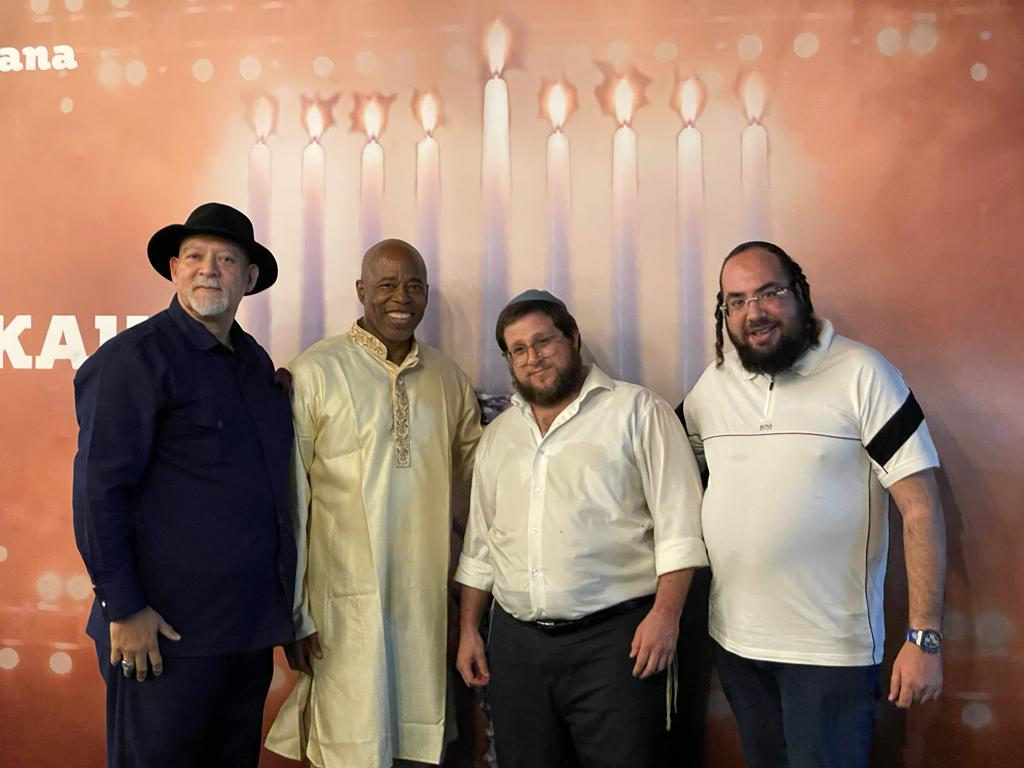
Mayor-elect Adams at a Chabad House in Accra, Ghana

After getting elected, Adams reconfirmed his pledge to reinstate a plainclothes police unit that deals with gun violence. Some Black Lives Matter activists denounced the effort, but Adams labeled the behavior "grandstanding."

On November 4, 2021, Adams tweeted that he planned to take his first three paychecks as Mayor in bitcoin and that New York City would be "the center of the cryptocurrency industry and other fast-growing, innovative industries."

Adams announced he would bring back the "gifted and talented" school program, improve relations with New York State, review property taxes, and implement agency budget cuts ranging from 3% to 5%.

On October 15, 2024, Adams appointed Chauncey Parker as the new Deputy Mayor for Public Safety.

=== Opinion polling ===
Shortly after Adams's inauguration, polls found that he had a 63% approval rating. On June 7, 2022, a poll conducted by Siena College, in conjunction with Spectrum News and its NY1 affiliate, found that Adams had an approval rating of 29%. The poll also found that 76% of New Yorkers worried they could be a victim of a violent crime. A December 2023 poll published by Quinnipiac University Polling Institute showed Adams's approval rating at 28% among registered voters, which at the time was the lowest approval of any mayor since the institution began polling in the city in 1996. In October 2024, in the midst of multiple investigations into wrongdoing, a Marist College poll found Adams's approval rating to be just 26%. It further found that 65% of respondents believed Adams had committed illegal acts, and 69% thought he should resign; if he did not resign, 63% expressed a desire for governor Hochul to remove him. By March 2025, another Quinnipiac University poll found that Adams's approval rating had fallen to just 20%.

=== Tenure ===
==== First 100 days ====
Adams took office shortly after the New Year's Eve Ball Drop at midnight in Times Square, holding a picture of his recently deceased mother, Dorothy, while being sworn in. He became the city's second mayor of African American descent to hold the position after David Dinkins left office in 1993.

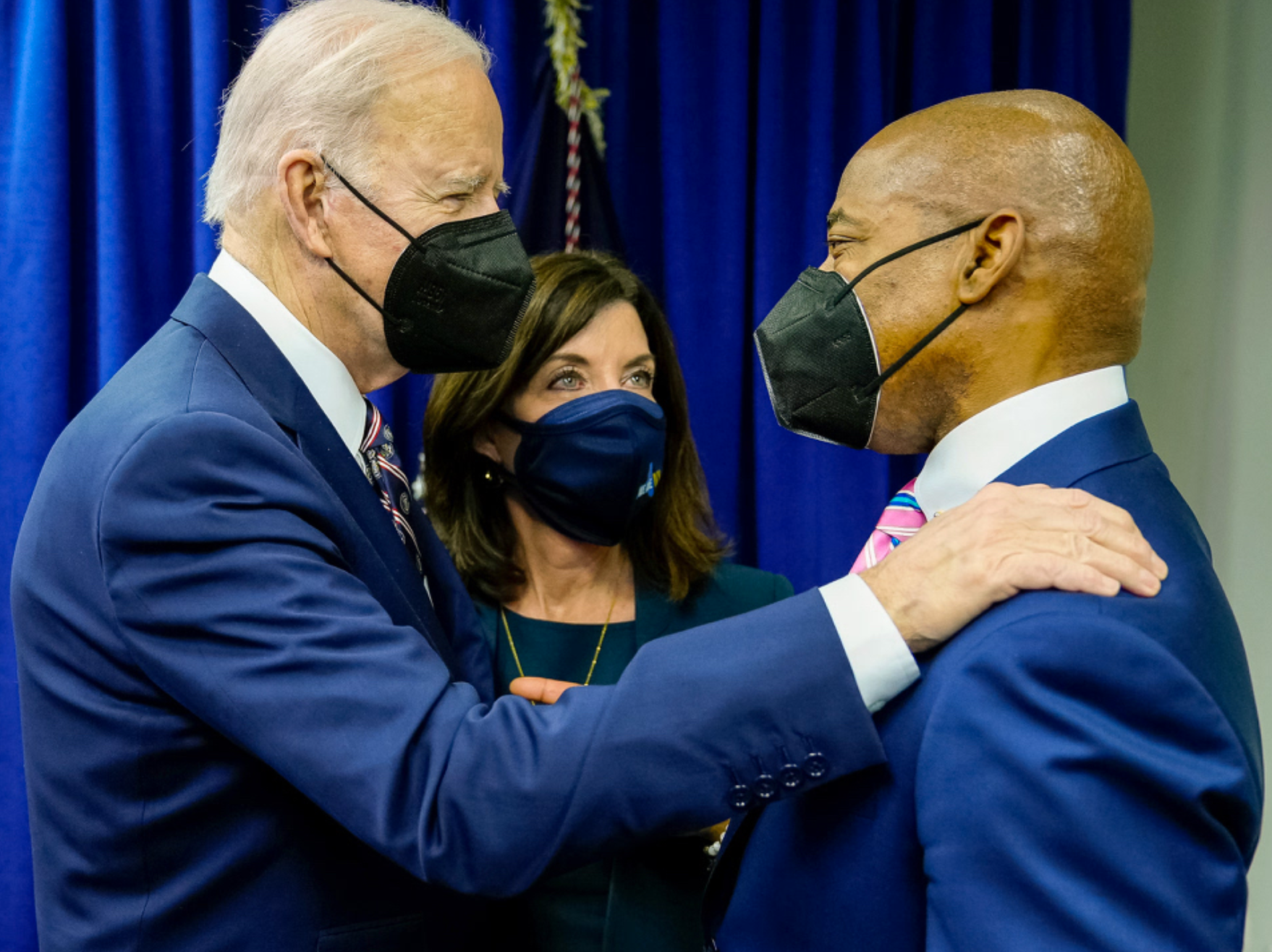
Adams with President Joe Biden and Governor Kathy Hochul in February 2022

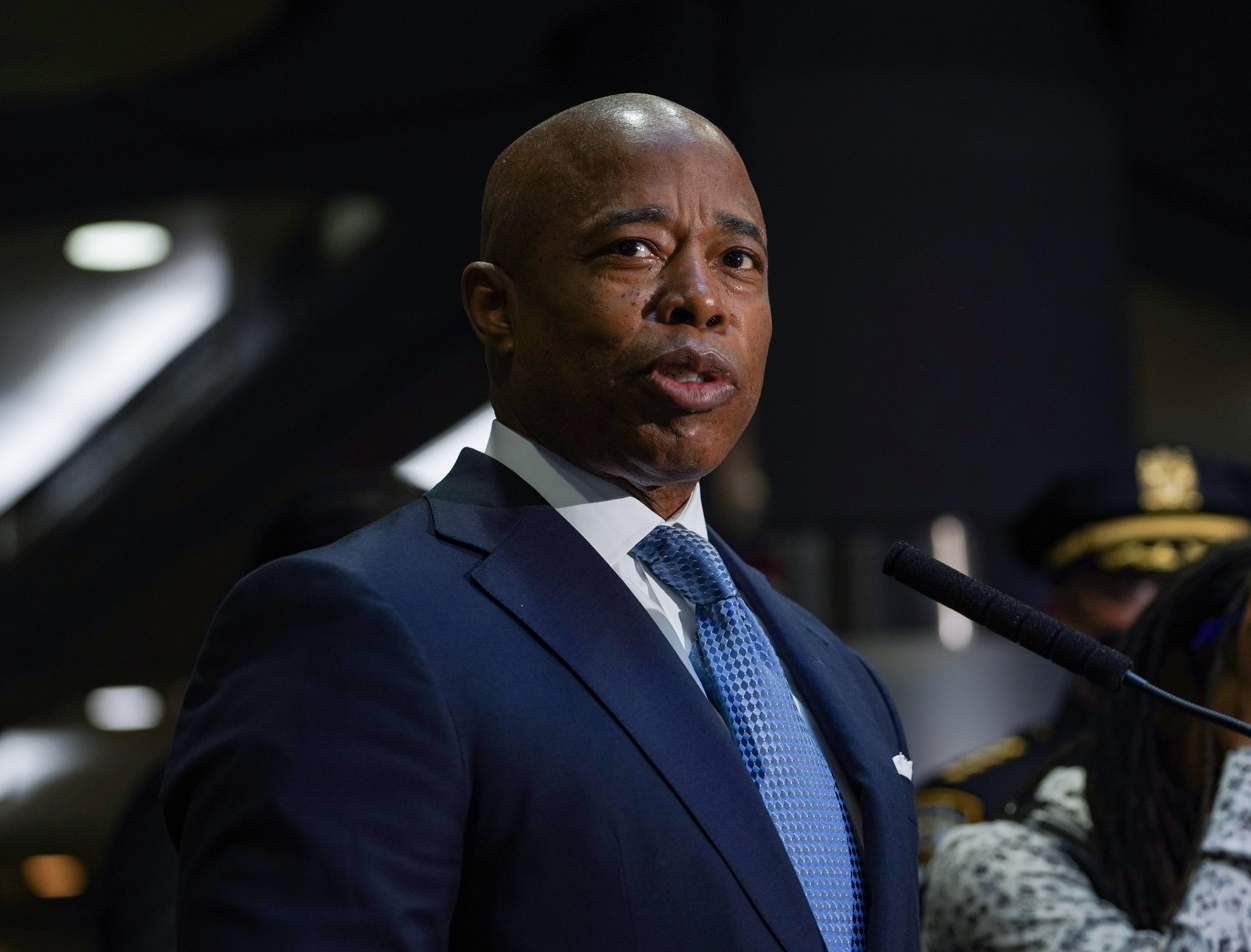
Adams speaking about his subway safety plan in February 2022

Shortly after becoming Mayor, Adams sought a waiver from the Conflicts of Interest Board to hire his brother, Bernard, for a $210,000 paying job in the NYPD, where he would serve as the head of his personal security detail. Bernard started working the job on December 30, 2021, two days before Adams was inaugurated as Mayor. Adams was accused of nepotism for this pick. Adams said white supremacy and anarchists are on the rise and "suggested that he can trust no one in the police department as much as he can his own kin." He was also criticized for his hiring of Philip Banks III, a former NYPD commander, to serve as deputy mayor for public safety. Banks had been the subject of a federal investigation by the FBI in 2014, the same year he resigned from the police force.

Eight days into Adams's tenure as Mayor, an apartment fire in the Bronx killed 17 people, including eight children. In response to the fire, Adams announced that a law requiring self-closing doors to prevent smoke and fires from spreading throughout apartment buildings would be enforced. However, his administration faced criticism for its slow response in distributing disaster funds to those impacted by the fire.

New York City faced a significant uptick in crime during the first months of Adams's tenure as Mayor. The uptick in crime was highlighted by the shooting deaths of two NYPD officers, Jason Rivera and Wilbert Mora, when responding to a domestic disturbance in Harlem. In response, Adams announced that he would be bringing back a police unit made up of plainclothes officers, which was disbanded by de Blasio in 2020 following the murder of George Floyd. The unit was officially revived on March 16, 2022. Amid the crime spree, President Joe Biden and Attorney General Merrick Garland visited New York City and vowed to work with Adams to crack down on homemade firearms, which lack traceable serial numbers and can be acquired without background checks. Throughout Adams's first year in office, crime continued to rise, resulting in both The New York Times and the New York Post labeling his plans as "ineffectual".

In early February 2022, a video of Adams from 2019 leaked in which the then-Borough President boasted about being a better cop than his "cracker" colleagues. Adams apologized for his comments, saying, "I apologize not only to those who heard it but to New Yorkers because they should expect more from me, which was inappropriate."

Later in February, Adams implemented a zero-tolerance policy for homeless people sleeping in subway cars or subway stations. Police officers, assisted by mental health professionals, were tasked with removing homeless people from the subway system and directing them to homeless shelters or mental health facilities. The plan has been met with criticism from some activists. The Adams administration also took a stand against homeless encampments. In the first three months of Adams's tenure, more than 300 homeless encampments had been declared and cleared. To track these encampments, the Adams administration directed NYPD officers to report information on homeless encampments to the Department of Homeless services, who is then tasked with responding to them within a week.

On February 14, 2022, 1,430 New York City municipal workers were fired after refusing to be vaccinated against COVID-19. The mandate had been introduced in October 2021 by Adams's predecessor but kept in place by Adams. In March 2022, Adams ended the city's vaccine mandate for indoor settings and the city's mask mandate in public schools. That same month, Adams announced that he would keep the city's vaccine mandate for private-sector employees but create an exemption for athletes and performers. The policy became known as the "Kyrie Carve-Out", as it was intended to allow unvaccinated Brooklyn Nets star Kyrie Irving to play home basketball games.

On February 23, 2022, Adams called on companies based in New York City to rescind remote work policies put in place during the COVID-19 pandemic, saying, "You can't stay home in your pajamas all day." Adams cited the need for in-person workers in the city who would patronize local businesses, saying "I need the accountant in the office so that they can go to the local restaurant so that we can make sure that everyone is employed."

==== Remainder of 2022 ====
On April 11, 2022, Adams was diagnosed with COVID-19 and entered quarantine for ten days. While Adams was quarantined, a man shot 10 people on a New York City Subway train in Brooklyn. Adams worked virtually to issue a response to the attack and criticized the national "overproliferation" of guns as being responsible for gun violence. Following the shooting, he suggested the implementation of metal detectors to screen riders entering the subway.

In June 2022, Adams unveiled his administration's "comprehensive blueprint" for affordable housing. However, the plan was critiqued for being too vague as it did not propose rezoning to build more housing, and did not contain any actual estimate of how many new housing units would be built.

In response to an influx of asylum seekers sent to New York City from the states of Florida and Texas, Adams announced plans to install Humanitarian Emergency Response and Relief Center Tent Cities on Randalls Island. After about one month, the tent city was closed and the migrants were moved to hotels in downtown Manhattan.

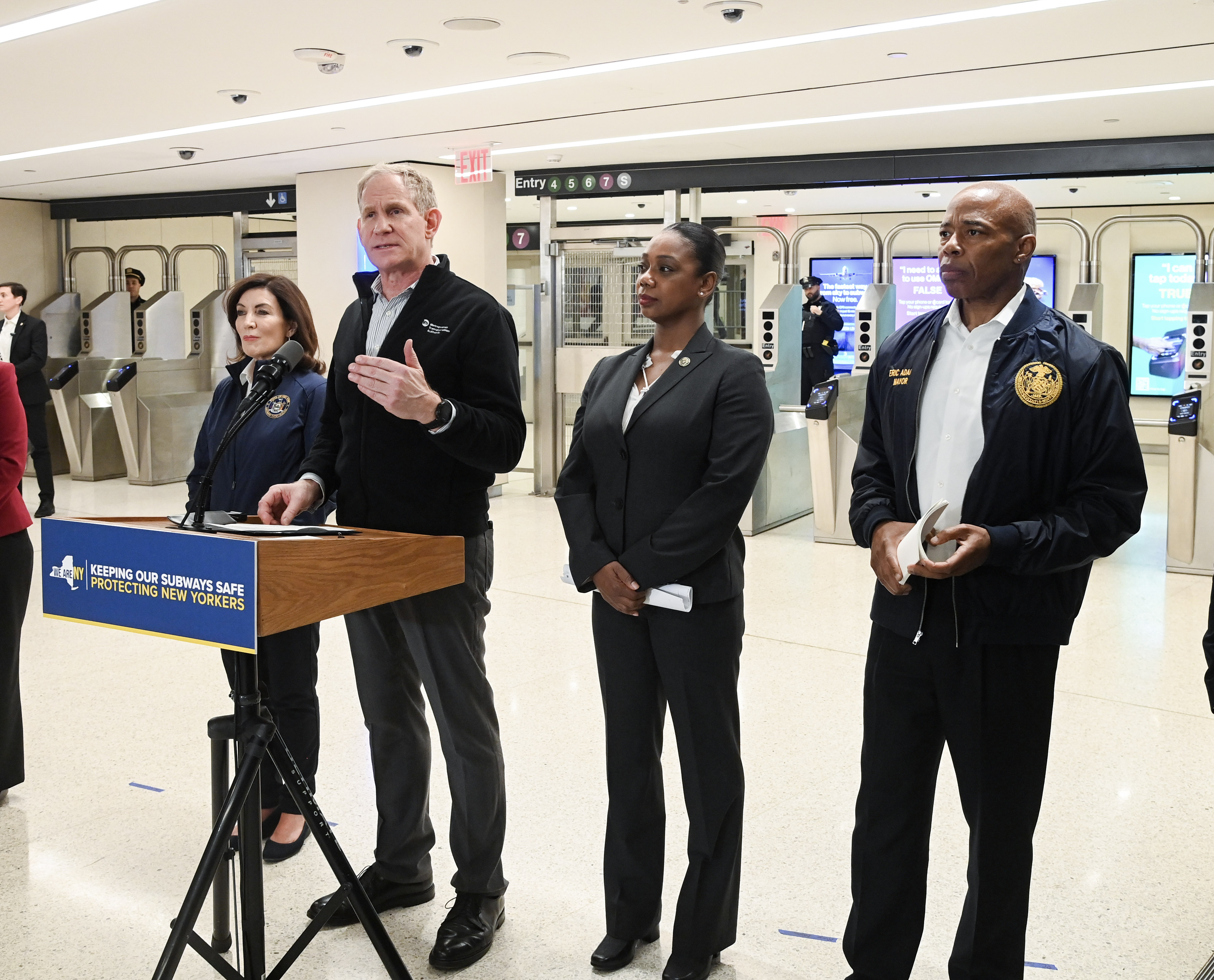
Adams with Governor Kathy Hochul, MTA Chair Janno Lieber and Police Commissioner Keechant Sewell on October 22, 2024

In late November, as part of his campaign to combat crime and clear homeless encampments in New York City, Adams announced an effort to allow the police to commit mentally ill people to psychiatric institutions involuntarily. The policy states that those hospitalized should only be discharged once they are stable and connected to ongoing care. The policy will be enforced by police, care workers, and medical officials, who will be tasked with identifying those who have a mental illness and who are unable to care for themselves. The policy applies to those who pose no direct danger to themselves or others.

In December 2022, Adams, Reverends Al Sharpton and Conrad Tillard, Vista Equity Partners CEO and Carnegie Hall Chairman Robert F. Smith, World Values Network founder and CEO Rabbi Shmuley Boteach, and Elisha Wiesel joined to host 15 Days of Light, celebrating Hanukkah and Kwanzaa in a unifying holiday ceremony at Carnegie Hall. Adams said: "social media is having a major impact on the hatred that we are seeing in our city and in this country ... We should bring social media companies to the table to highlight the racist and antisemitic words being spread on their platforms."

==== 2023 ====
In late February 2023, at the annual interfaith breakfast, Adams said he disagreed with the notion of separation of church and state. During the speech. Adams said, "Don't tell me about no separation of church and state. State is the body. Church is the heart. You take the heart out of the body, the body dies." Additionally, Adams said he disagreed with the Supreme Court's 1962 decision in Engel v. Vitale, which held school prayer to be unconstitutional. Adams added, "When we took prayers out of schools, guns came into schools ..."

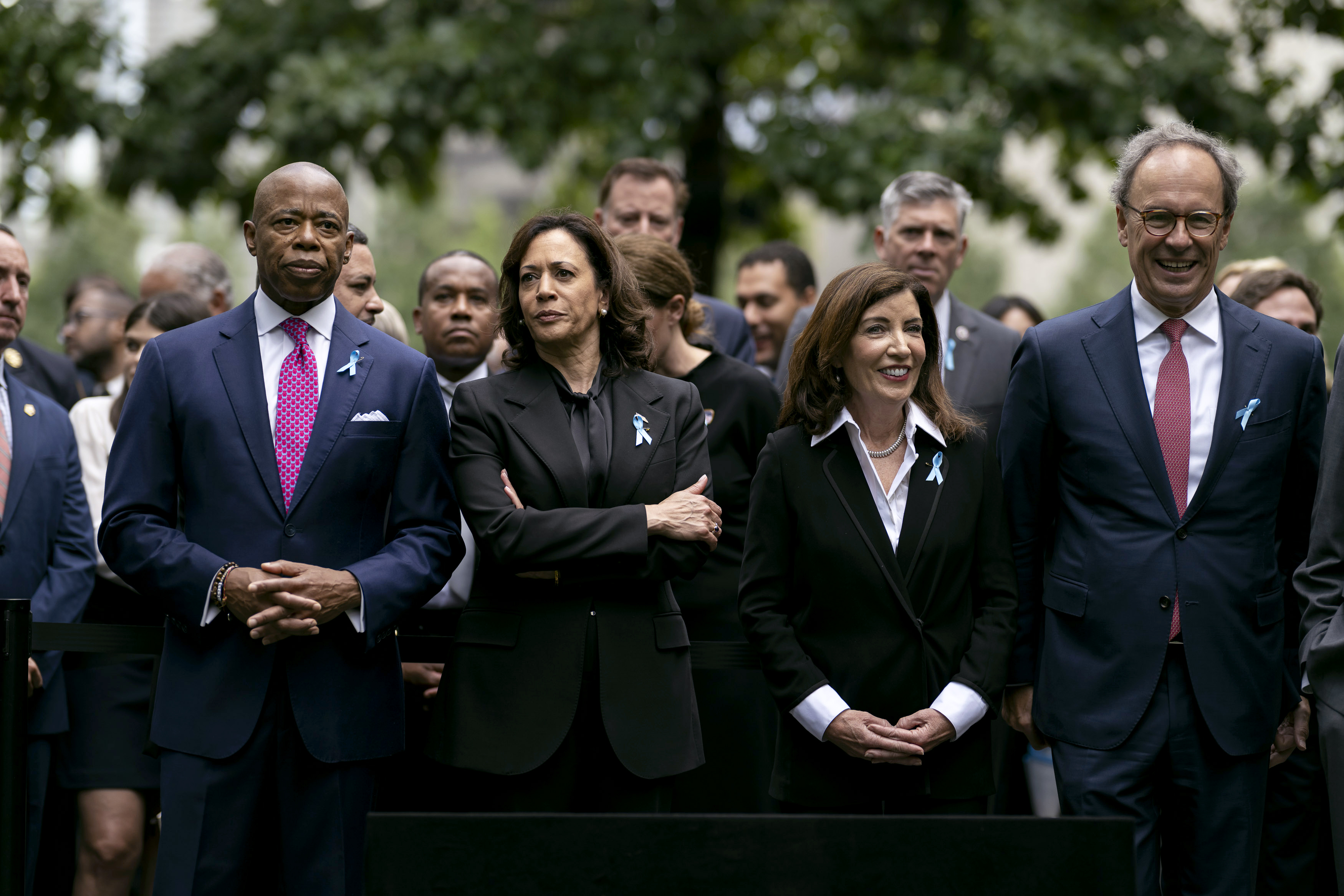
Adams with Vice President Kamala Harris and Governor Hochul in September 2023

In March 2023, as a result of the high office vacancy rates, the New York City Department of City Planning advanced plans to convert vacant office buildings into "affordable" apartments. Adams elicited backlash after proposing "dormitory style accommodations" and declaring that apartments did not require windows.

In 2022 and 2023, Adams and the Municipal Labor Committee (MLC), which is led by the presidents of two sizeable municipal labor unions, District Council 37 (DC 37) and the United Federation of Teachers (UFT), agreed on a deal that would move City retirees from traditional Medicare to a new, privately run Medicare Advantage plan. Although the MLC comprises the leadership of every municipal union, MLC voting is proportional to the union's size, giving DC 37 and the UFT more than enough votes to prevail over unions opposed to the deal. Many City retirees have protested the agreement between the Mayor and the MLC.

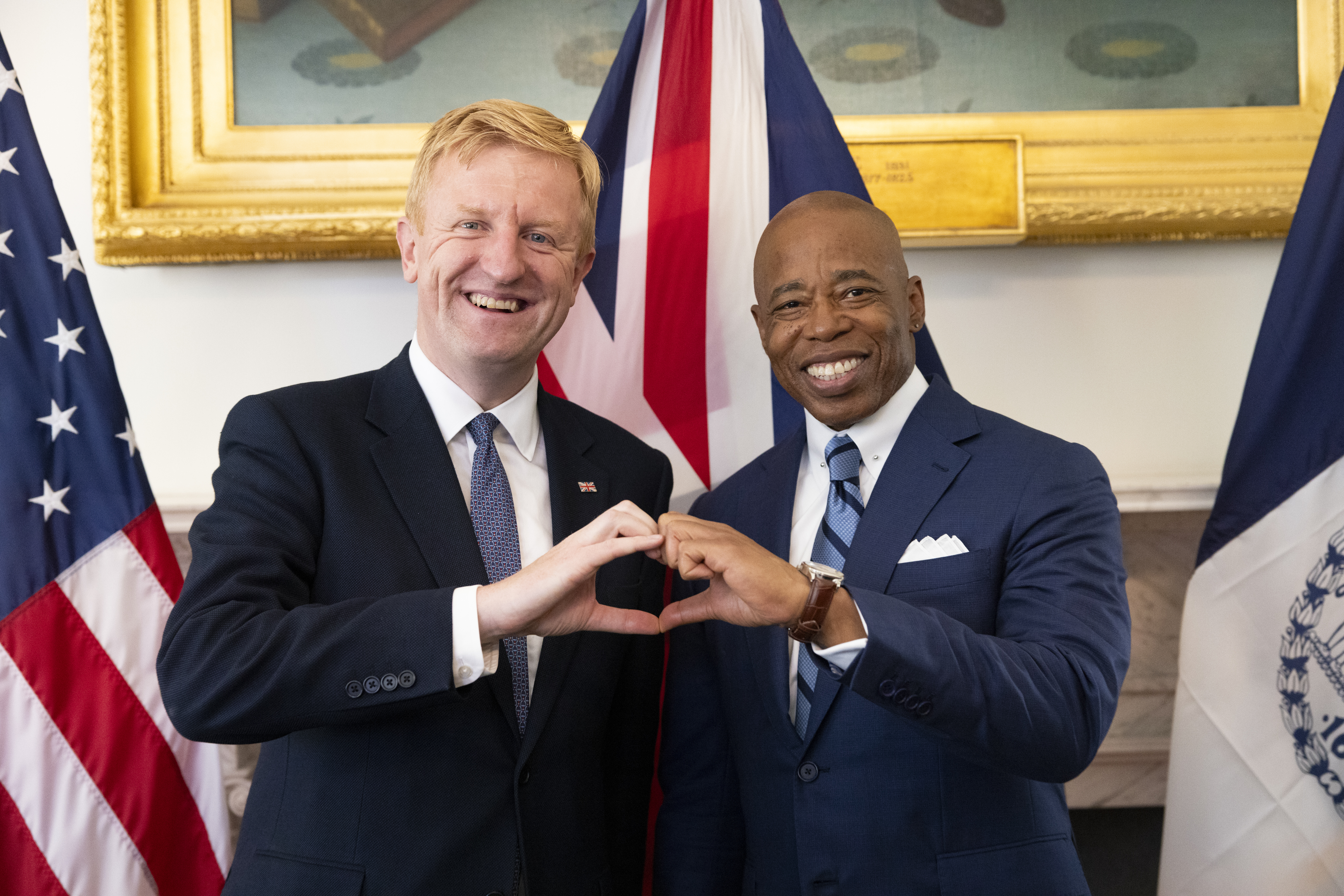
Adams with British Conservative Party politician Oliver Dowden in October 2023

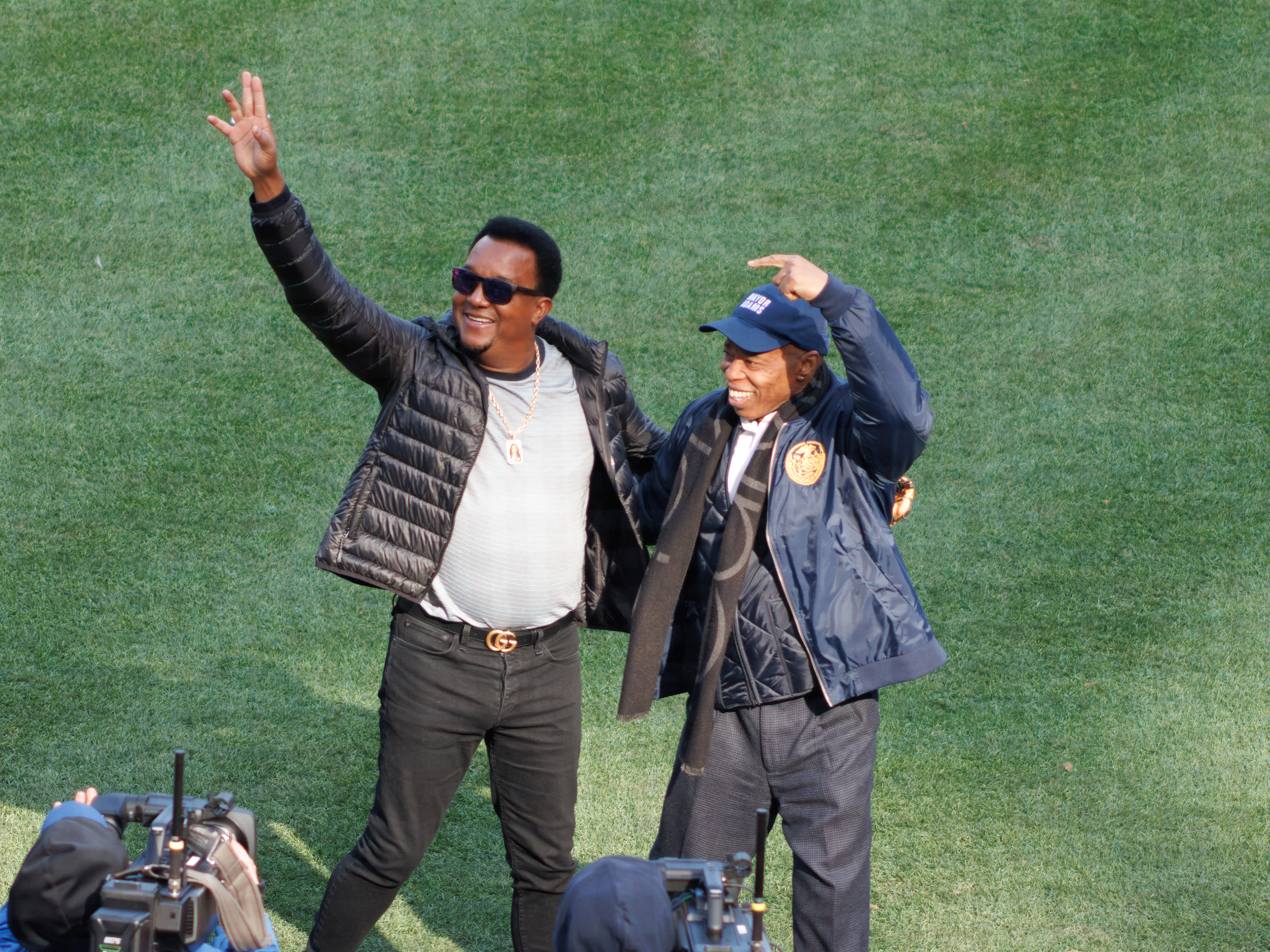
Adams with former professional baseball pitcher Pedro Martínez in November 2023

As mayor, when Yom HaAtzma'ut fell on April 25, Adams announced the night-time lighting of City Hall and other municipal buildings blue and white, identifying the assessment of the modern state of Israel's history as "three-quarters of a century promoting peace and security in the Middle East and hope and opportunity across the globe" as "stand[ing] side by side" with New York's Jewish community.

In 2023, the Adams administration spent $50,000 to relocate 114 migrant households who entered New York City from the Mexico-United States southern border to countries like China and other states within the United States. They were resettled during the years of 2021 and 2022. The migrants were seeking political asylum. Adams vetoed a bill to increase penalties for zoning violations in New York. In July 2023, during the New York City migrant housing crisis, Adams argued that New York City was running out of room and resources to provide for the influx of roughly 100,000 migrants from the southern border. He said, "Our cup has basically runneth over. We have no more room in the city." In August 2023, a lawyer for Governor Kathy Hochul accused Adams of being slow to act and failing to accept aid offers from the state to manage the migrants. In September 2023, Adams warned reporters that the migrant crisis could "destroy" New York City.

On June 23, 2023, Adams vetoed legislation that would have increased eligibility for housing vouchers to homeless families and individuals under the CityFHEPS program; Adams implemented part of the legislation via executive order, eliminating a 90-day waiting requirement for people currently in shelters. In an op-ed in the New York Daily News, Adams claimed that the bills would cost too much and create administrative difficulties. The City Council responded in a series of annotations to the op-ed, "call[ing] the mayor's arguments 'wrong,' 'misleading,' 'gaslighting' and 'alternative facts'". On July 13, 2023, the City Council overrode the Mayor's veto by a vote of 42–8, marking the first veto override since the administration of Michael Bloomberg. The New York Times described the override as "another example of the increasingly confrontational relationship between the City Council and the mayor", and City & State said that it was "a turning point for the City Council". Adams has indicated that he may challenge the veto override in court. Adams also sought to challenge the "right to shelter" consent ruling in Callahan v. Carey.

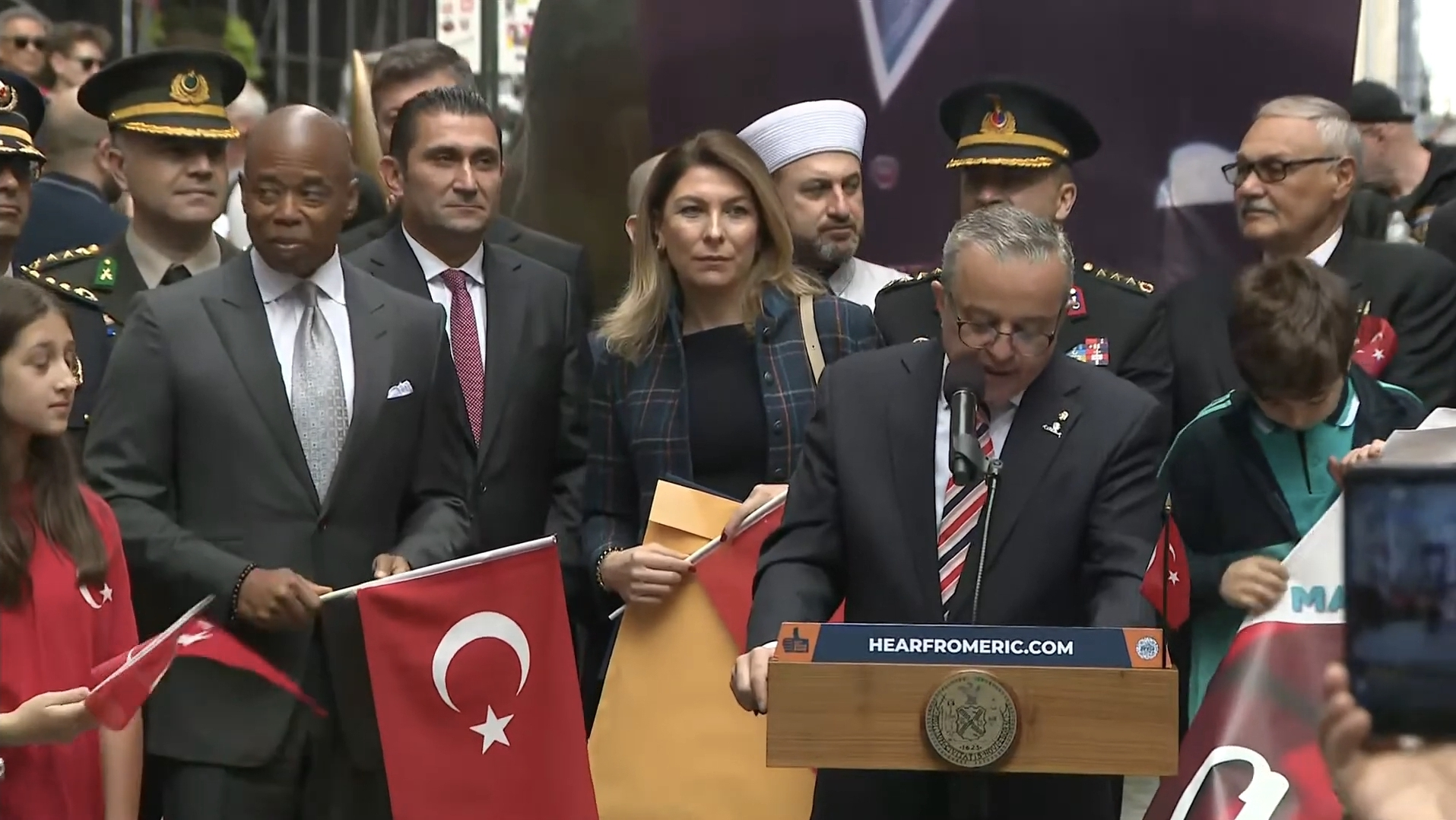
Adams and Rana Abbasova at a flag raising ceremony in celebration of the 100th Anniversary of the Republic of Turkey on October 27, 2023

During a housing town hall on June 28, 2023, 84-year-old Holocaust survivor and Washington Heights tenant advocate Jeanie Dubnau accused Adams of being controlled by the real-estate lobby and questioned him about the past two years of rent increases on rent-stabilized housing, which were approved by a board he appointed. Adams responded, "Don't stand in front like you treated someone that's on the plantation that you own." The following day, a local radio channel asked Adams if he felt he "went too far"; Adams refused to apologize and called Dubnau's behavior "degrading".

In November 2023, Adams was accused in a lawsuit of sexual assault by an anonymous former coworker while they were both city employees in 1993. Adams denied the accusation, claiming he did not know who the accuser was and if they had ever met; he did not recall it. The lawsuit also accused Adams of battery, employment discrimination based on gender and sex, retaliation, a hostile work environment, and intentional infliction of emotional distress, and also named the NYPD Transit Bureau and the Guardians Association of the NYPD as defendants.

In December 2023, the United Federation of Teachers filed a lawsuit against Eric Adams to prevent a $550 million cut to education funding.

==== 2024 ====
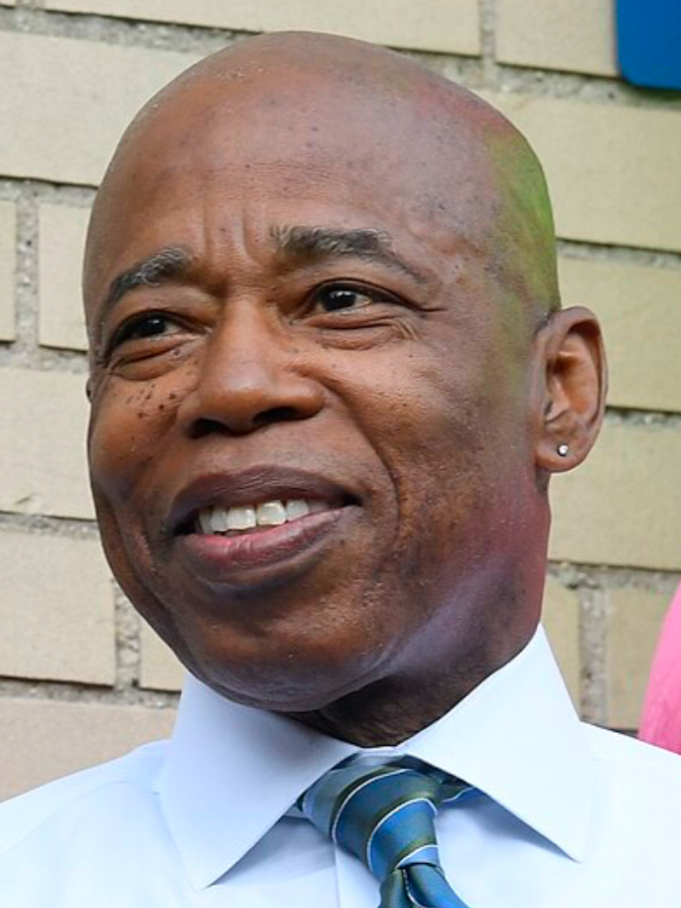
Eric Adams In 2024

On January 30, 2024, the New York City Council voted to override Mayor Adams's veto of the How Many Stops Act under the command of Council Speaker Adrienne Adams. The new law officially limits the use of solitary confinement of prisoners being held on Rikers Island and all city jails and requires police officers to take detailed notes of encounters with members of the public who they suspect of committing a crime or for other reasons. Councilman Yusef Salaam is the Chair of the Public Safety Committee and he also had a part in bringing this legislation to the floor for a vote.

Adams rejected a ceasefire in the Gaza war, saying "Bring the hostages home."

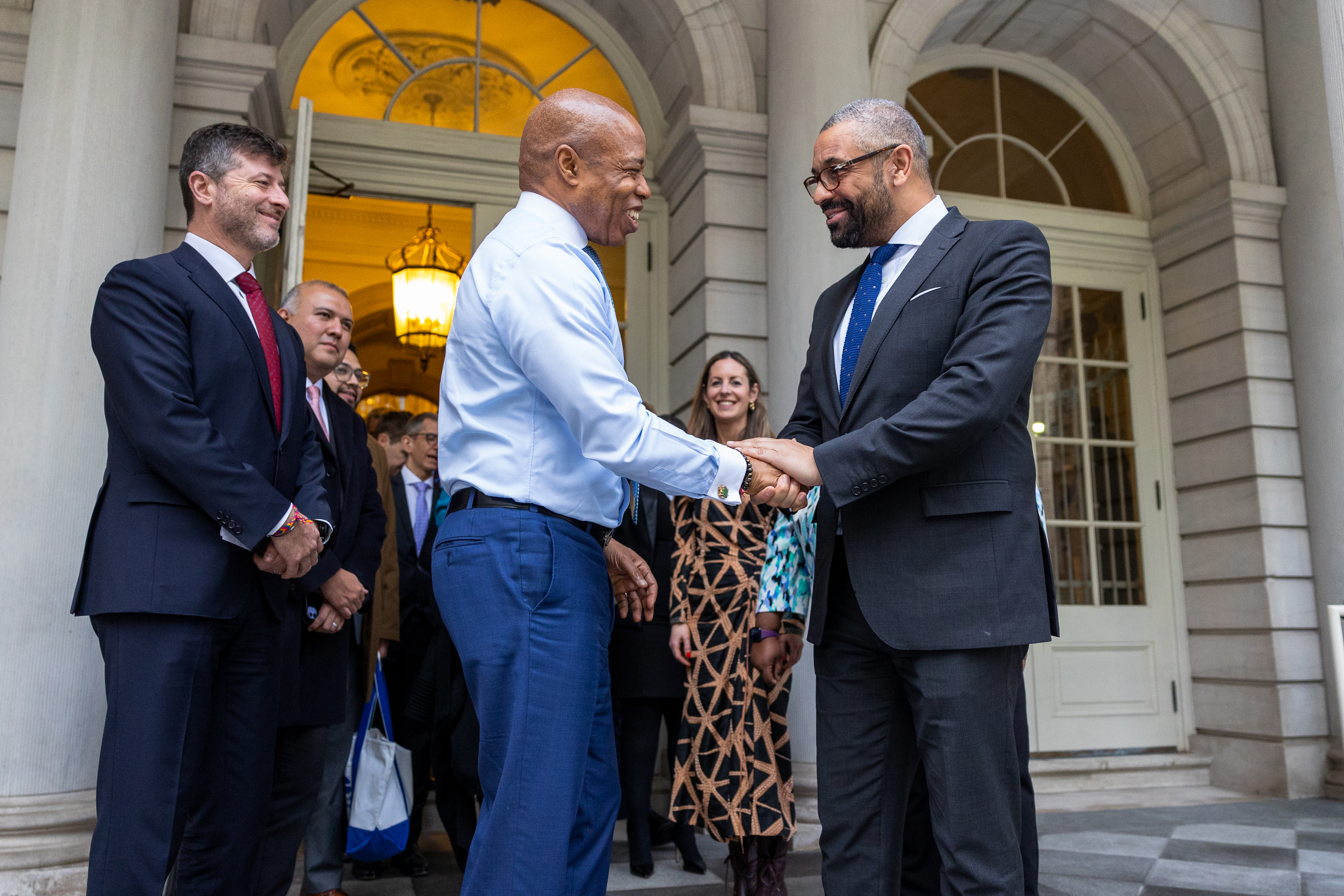
Adams with British Conservative Party politician James Cleverly in February 2024

At a news conference, Adams suggested that the city could hire migrants as lifeguards because they are "excellent swimmers". The comment was called "racist and divisive" by unnamed immigrant rights groups.

Adams has promoted a series of changes to New York City's zoning laws called the "City of Yes". The first proposal, intended to make environmentally-friendly building renovations and rooftop solar installations easier, was approved by the City Council on December 6, 2023. The second proposal, intended to allow businesses more flexibility in terms of where they can operate, was approved on June 6, 2024. The third proposal, intended to allow "a little more housing in every neighborhood", is scheduled for a vote in December 2024. Proponents say the proposal is crucial to address the New York City housing shortage, while opponents have raised concerns about changes it will bring to low-density neighborhoods.

On May 21, 2024, Adams created a Charter Revision Commission to propose changes to the New York City Charter. It released five proposals, which will be subject to voter approval on November 5. Critics said the proposals, three of which limit the City Council's power, were designed to push an earlier ballot measure, which would have limited mayoral power, off the ballot. A spokeswoman for the City Council called the commission a "sham" and accused it of "undermining democracy and oversight of the Mayor's administration".

Police Commissioner Edward — and Chief Counsel Lisa Zornberg each left the Adams administration in September 2024. Reports indicated that Zornberg departed due to Adams's "refusal to get rid of officials who have come under federal scrutiny".

Timothy Pearson, a senior adviser to Adams, left his position as of October 4, 2024. Pearson was the subject of complaints of battery and sexual harassment. On October 7, 2024, Mohamed Bahi, Adams's chief liaison to the Muslim community, resigned his position. A day later, Bahi was arrested and "charged with witness tampering and destruction of evidence in relation to the Southern District of New York's investigation into Adams' 2021 campaign". Also in October 2024, Deputy Mayor for Public Safety Phil Banks and Director of Asian Affairs Winnie Greco resigned their posts; the homes of Banks and Greco had previously been searched by federal authorities. First Deputy Mayor Sheena Wright also stepped down in October, as did Schools Chancellor David Banks; Wright is married to Phil Banks, and David Banks is the brother of Phil Banks. Health Commissioner Ashwin Vasan also left his position in October 2024.

On October 26, 2024, Adams spoke out in defense of former President Donald Trump and criticized Vice President Harris, claiming that he did not think that Trump was a fascist.

On November 12, 2024, mandated trash containerization for buildings with 10 or fewer units became effective. The pro-containerization policy began a year prior with mandates for restaurants, and intends to achieve full containerization on 89% of city streets. The New York Times described containerization as "one of the major achievements of Mayor Eric Adams's first term."

In December 2024, chief adviser Ingrid Lewis-Martin resigned her position; she was later indicted on bribery charges. Also in December 2024, Chief of Department Jeffrey Maddrey of the New York Police Department resigned his position following accusations of sexual misconduct.

==== 2025 ====
In April 2025, Adams invited U.S. Secretary of Transportation Sean Duffy to take a ride on the subway following recent comments by Duffy deriding the subway as a "shithole" and epicenter of violent crime. Ultimately the pair rode the subway for 10 minutes, from Brooklyn to Manhattan, reportedly discussing crime rates and those with mental illness in the public transportation system as well as the congestion pricing policy in the city. In 2025, Adams signed an executive order to reopen an ICE office on Rikers Island.

On July 8, four former NYPD officers filed individual suits against Adams and high-ranking NYPD officials. The plaintiffs had each served in leadership roles—chief of detectives, assistant chief of the criminal task force division, chief of professional standards, and second in command for internal affairs—and allege in part that Adams enabled department corruption and retaliation for speaking out. Edward Caban, the former commissioner, Jeffrey Maddrey, the former chief of department, Philip Banks III, the former deputy mayor for public safety, and John Chell, the current chief of department, are also among the defendants in one or more of the suits.

On July 16, Tom Donlon, who had served as interim NYPD commissioner, filed suit against Adams and high-ranking NYPD officials, alleging that they had engaged in a "coordinated criminal conspiracy" to enrich themselves, prevented executive misconduct investigations, forged documents, and engaged in retaliation.

During Adam's mayoral lame duck session, Mayor Adams created a new commission. This commission's leadership positions and other positions are occupied with operatives appointed by Mayor Adams. Its ostensible purpose was to provide a political check and fiscal oversight over the new mayor's power.

=== Investigations and federal indictment ===
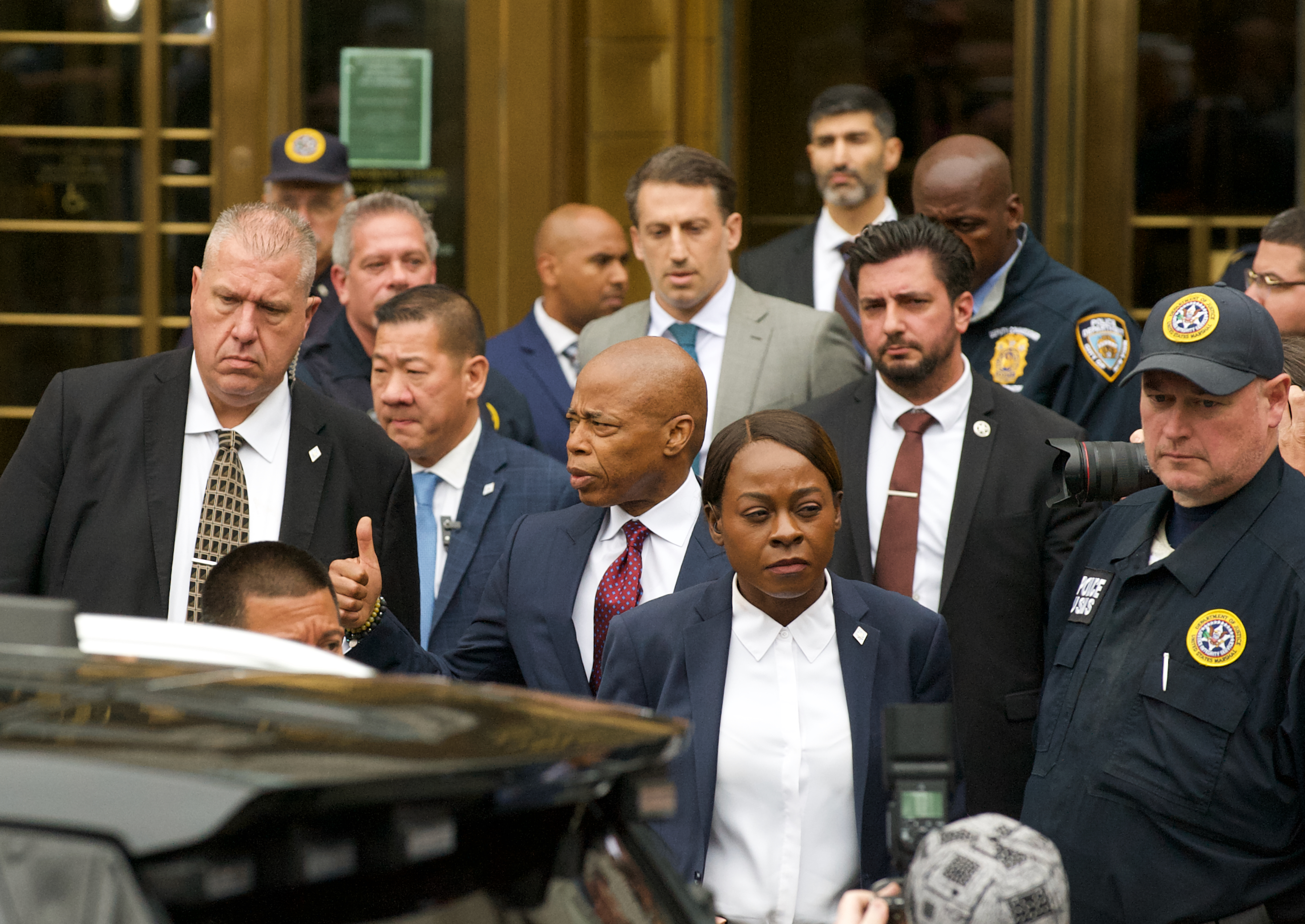
Adams exiting the courthouse on the day of his arraignment

On November 12, 2023, The New York Times reported that an FBI investigation into Adams was related in part to an alleged influence by the Turkish government to have its consulate in a Manhattan building approved by New York City authorities without a fire inspection. In September 2024, a series of investigations into Adams's administration emerged. On September 25, 2024, Adams was indicted on federal charges. He is the first mayor in New York City history to be charged with federal crimes while in office. On September 26, the case was unsealed, revealing the five charges: bribery, conspiracy, fraud, and two counts of soliciting illegal foreign campaign donations. The allegations for which Adams was indicted date back to 2014, when he was still Brooklyn Borough President. Adams is accused of receiving luxury travel and other benefits from Turkish individuals, namely a government official and several businessmen. This included Adams pressuring the New York City Fire Department to open a Turkish consular building without a fire inspection. Allegedly, in order to cover up his misconduct, Adams created and instructed others to make false paper trails indicating he actually paid for these trips in full.

The indictment also notes that Turkish officials pressed a staffer for assurances that Adams would boycott 2022 commemorations of the Armenian Genocide Remembrance Day, in line with Turkey's official policy of Armenian genocide denial, and that Adams appeared to comply with the request. The indictment states:

On April 21, 2022, the Turkish official messaged the Adams staffer, noting that Armenian Genocide Remembrance Day was approaching, and repeatedly asked the Adams staffer for assurances that Adams would not make any statement about the Armenian Genocide ... The Adams staffer confirmed that Adams would not make a statement about the Armenian Genocide. Adams did not make such a statement.

Adams was arraigned in federal court on September 27, entering a plea of not guilty. The same day, U.S. Representative Jerry Nadler, the dean of the New York Democratic House delegation, called for Adams to resign. As of September 2024, 15 Democratic state and local leaders, including Rep. Alexandria Ocasio-Cortez of the Bronx, had also called for his resignation. Some elected officials called for New York Governor Kathy Hochul to remove Adams from office.

In response, Adams said that the charges against him were "entirely false" and "based on lies". He called for an immediate trial and vowed to fight the charges. Adams also claimed that he was being retaliated against for opposing the Biden administration's handling of the migrant crisis. On September 30, Adams sought dismissal of the bribery charge against him for being "extraordinarily vague" and arguing that it was brought by "zealous prosecutors."

On February 10, 2025, the Department of Justice under President Trump instructed federal prosecutors to drop charges against Adams, citing concerns that the case had been affected by publicity and was interfering with his ability to govern. The memo directing this move, written by acting Deputy Attorney General Emil Bove, stated that the prosecution had limited Adams's capacity to focus on issues such as immigration and crime. The charges were to be dropped "as soon as is practicable" pending a further review of Adams's case following the general election in November 2025. Danielle Sassoon, the U.S. Attorney in charge of the case, refused to dismiss the charges, telling Attorney General Pam Bondi that "I cannot agree to seek a dismissal driven by improper considerations." Sassoon later resigned, accusing Bove and the Trump administration of making an illicit deal with Adams to dismiss the charges. The case was then assigned to the Department of Justice's Public Integrity Section, following which John Keller, the section's acting head, and Kevin Driscoll, the acting head of the Department of Justice's Criminal Division, both resigned. Emil Bove gathered the remaining members of the public integrity unit, ordering them to find a prosecutor who would file a motion to dismiss the charges.

Following the announcement that the Department of Justice was seeking to dismiss the charges against Adams, four deputy mayors within the Adams administration announced their departures. The efforts by the new Trump administration to dismiss the case came in the same week as the administration was negotiating with the mayor over immigration enforcement initiatives and White House Executive Associate Director of Enforcement and Removal Operations, Tom Homan, saying during a joint-interview with Adams that if Adams did not cooperate on immigration, Homan would then visit Adams's "office, up his butt saying, 'Where the hell is the agreement we came to?'" Earlier, Adams had agreed with Homan to give access to the city's Rikers Island jail for ICE without violating the city's sanctuary laws, via a "loophole ... [Adams] appears to have found". Adams then joined Homan in a joint interview conducted by Dr. Phil McGraw, among one or more other joint interviews.

Adams's indictment was dismissed with prejudice by judge Dale Ho on April 2, 2025. Ho wrote that the court "cannot force the Department of Justice to prosecute a defendant." Ho highlighted that the dismissal was "not about whether Mayor Adams is innocent or guilty"; the dismissal "does not express any opinion as to the merits of the case or whether the prosecution of Mayor Adams 'should' move forward". Ho found that Adams's case was "entirely consistent with prior public corruption prosecutions", that prosecutors "followed all appropriate Justice Department guidelines" with "no evidence" of "improper motives".

Judge Ho commented that the Justice Department's dismissal request "smacks of a bargain: dismissal of the Indictment in exchange for immigration policy concessions". Ho declined to dismiss without prejudice as requested by the Justice Department, as Ho wrote that doing so risked Adams becoming seemingly "more beholden to the demands of the federal government than to the wishes of his own constituents", as it would appear that Adams's "freedom depends on his ability to carry out the immigration enforcement priorities" of the Trump administration.

In March 2026, New York City's law department sought a judge's approval to stop representing him in the lawsuit.

On June 24, 2026, Adams' former chief of staff Frank Carone, Carone's brother Anthony and two others were arrested in connection with the bribery investigation.

There have also been allegations that Adams was involved in the Weihong Hu fraud incident. He was never charged in connection to it.

== 2025 mayoral campaign ==
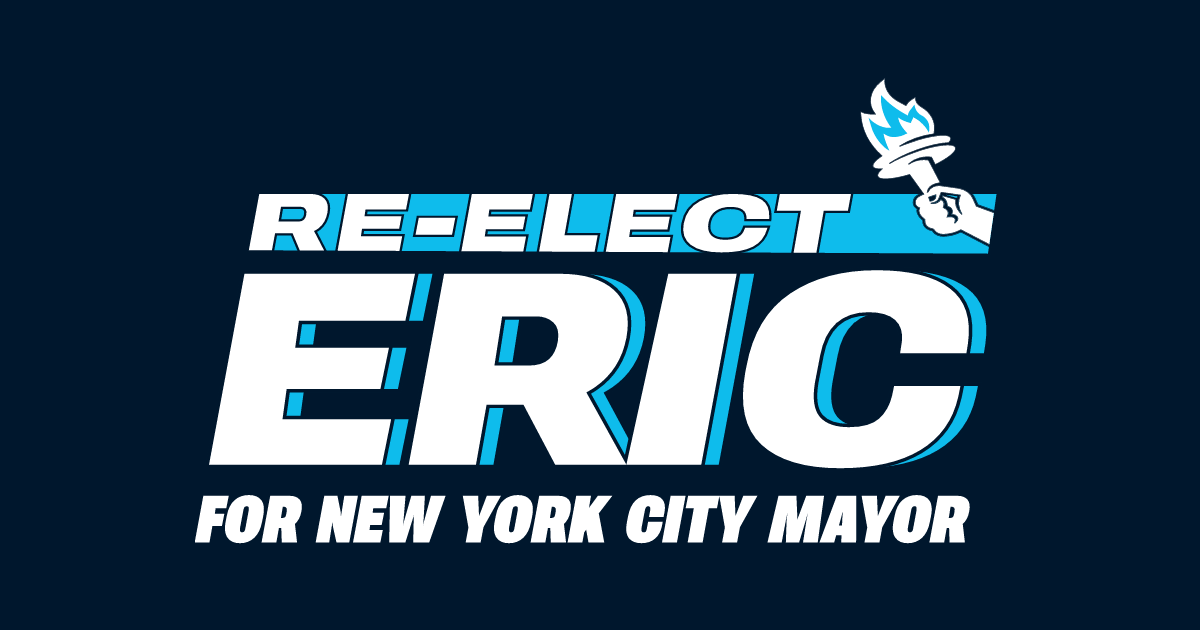
Adams' 2025 campaign logo

In the midst of his legal troubles, Adams announced he would run for reelection. Adams faced multiple challengers in the Democratic primary, and his approval rating was low. On April 3, 2025, Adams announced that he would exit the Democratic primary and instead run in the general election as an independent. Adams acknowledged that he did not have a realistic path to victory if he continued to seek the Democratic Party line. Adams is the first incumbent mayor to seek re-election without the nomination of either major party since John Lindsay in 1969; Lindsay lost the Republican nomination, but ran and won on the Liberal Party line. As of June 2025, Adams remains a registered Democrat.

Adams circulated petitions to run on an "EndAntiSemitism" ballot line and a "Safe&Affordable" ballot line. However, the Board of Elections has limited candidates to one ballot line under state election law. On September 28, 2025, Adams withdrew his candidacy for the general election, although his name remained on the ballot. On October 23, 2025, Adams endorsed Andrew Cuomo after appearing at a New York Knicks game alongside Cuomo.

== Post-mayoral career ==
In January 2026, Adams launched the "NYC Token" cryptocurrency. Adams stated that it was "built to fight the rapid spread of antisemitism and anti-Americanism." NYC Token rapidly reached a market capitalization of $600 million, before plummeting in value after an account affiliated with the token's launch withdrew about $2.5 million in early proceeds. The token was described as a rug pull. The team behind NYC Token said that the withdrawal of $2.5 million was intended to "rebalance the liquidity" of the cryptocurrency and claimed that they had not withdrawn any money from their account. $1.5 million was returned on January 13, with $1 million left unaccounted for.

== Electoral history ==
Year	Office	Type	Party	Main opponent	Party	Votes for Adams				Result	Swing
Year	Office	Type	Party	Main opponent	Party	Total	%	P.	±%	Result	Swing
1994	U.S. Representative	Primary	Democratic	Major Owens	Democratic	Withdrew				Lost	N/A
2006	State Senator	General	Democratic	James M. Gay	Republican	38,713	70.7%	1st	N/A	Won	Hold
2008	State Senator	General	Democratic	Stephen A. Christopher	Republican	79,000	70.9%	1st	+0.2%	Won	Hold
2010	State Senator	General	Democratic	Allan E. Romaguera	Republican	51,598	84.0%	1st	+13.1%	Won	Hold
2012	State Senator	General	Democratic	Rose Laney	Republican	81,110	84.6%	1st	+0.6%	Won	Hold
2013	Borough President	General	Democratic	Elias Weir	Republican	246,547	90.8%	1st	+5.8%	Won	Hold
2017	Borough President	General	Democratic	Vito Bruno	Republican	278,488	82.9%	1st	−7.9%	Won	Hold
2021	Mayor	Primary	Democratic	Kathryn Garcia	Democratic	404,513	50.4%	1st	N/A	Won	N/A
2021	Mayor	General	Democratic	Curtis Sliwa	Republican	753,801	67%	1st	+3.8%	Won	Hold
2025	Mayor	Primary	Democratic	Zohran Mamdani	Democratic	Withdrew				Lost	N/A
2025	Mayor	General	Independent (Note: Adams ran on the ballot line "Safe&Affordable/EndAntiSemitism" before withdrawing in September 2025.)	Zohran Mamdani	Democratic	6,382 (Note: Withdrawn; remained on ballot)	0.31%	4th	N/A	Lost	Hold

== Personal life ==
Adams has never been married. He has a son, Jordan Coleman, with former girlfriend Chrisena Coleman. His son is a graduate of American University, and is a filmmaker and television actor. Adams is currently in a relationship with Tracey Collins, the Senior Youth Development Director for the New York City Department of Education. Adams earned the nickname "Nightlife Mayor" due to his penchant for frequently clubbing in the city on Friday and Saturday nights.

Adams is a non-denominational Christian. In September 2023, along with New York City Police Commissioner Edward Caban, Adams became a Prince Hall Freemason as well as a 32nd Degree Member of the Scottish Rite. He has cited Mahatma Gandhi as an inspiration.

Adams frequently refers to himself in the third person.

=== Plant-based diet ===
In 2016, Adams switched to a plant-based diet after his diagnosis of type 2 diabetes. Adams researched alternatives to lifelong insulin injections and sought opinions of physicians including Caldwell B. Esselstyn Jr. of the Cleveland Clinic. Adams made lifestyle changes to treat his diabetes. He switched to a whole food plant-based diet, removing animal products, processed sugar, salt, oil, and processed starches. He also began exercising regularly, using an exercise bike and treadmill in his office. Within six months, he lost 30 lb (14 kg), reversed his diabetes, and reduced his blood pressure and cholesterol levels. He has said that he wants to encourage others to switch to a healthier diet, and that some of the public health spending for diabetes should go toward lifestyle changes rather than treating disease. In February 2022, after several accounts surfaced of Adams eating fish in public, questions emerged about whether Adams was truly a vegan. He responded that while he follows a plant-based diet, "I am perfectly imperfect and have occasionally eaten fish."

In October 2020, Adams published the plant-based advocacy cookbook, Healthy at Last: A Plant-Based Approach to Preventing and Reversing Diabetes and Other Chronic Illnesses, which also chronicles his health journey. He was also a contributor to the 2021 anthology Brotha Vegan: Black Men Speak on Food, Identity, Health, and Society. In Healthy at Last, he wrote that he initially followed his doctor's orders for taking medication before later switching to a plant-based diet with a doctor's consultation. However, in the 2023 Netflix documentary You Are What You Eat: A Twin Experiment, Adams claimed never to have used the medication. He also endorsed not taking medication that a doctor recommends in favor of the pure plant-based diet.

=== Sexual assault lawsuit ===
On November 22, 2023, a Florida woman filed a sexual assault lawsuit against Adams under the New York Adult Survivors Act. On March 18, 2024, a legal complaint related to the lawsuit was filed, alleging that in 1993, Adams drove the woman, who at the time had recently been passed over for a promotion, to a vacant lot, where he then asked her for oral sex in exchange for career advancement. The complaint also alleges that when the woman refused, Adams forced her to touch his penis and ejaculated on her leg. In addition to sexual assault, the lawsuit also includes counts of battery, intentional infliction of emotional distress, gender discrimination, retaliation and sexual harassment. On March 19, Adams denied the accusation, claiming he had conducted himself with dignity during his 40 years in public life.

=== Albanian citizenship ===
On April 10, 2026, president Bajram Begaj granted Adams honorary Albanian citizenship. Adams had previously traveled to Albania in October 2025 to meet with prime minister Edi Rama.

== Published works ==
- Don't Let It Happen. Xulon Press. 2009. ISBN 978-1607919858.
- Healthy at Last: A Plant-Based Approach to Preventing and Reversing Diabetes and Other Chronic Illnesses. Hay House. 2020. ISBN 978-1401960568.

== Notes ==
Political offices
Preceded by Marty Markowitz	Borough President of Brooklyn; 2014–2021	Succeeded by Antonio Reynoso
Preceded by Bill de Blasio	Mayor of New York City; 2022–2025	Succeeded by Zohran Mamdani
Party political offices
Preceded by Bill de Blasio	Democratic nominee for Mayor of New York City; 2021	Succeeded by Zohran Mamdani
