= Vapor wake canine =

Class of bomb-sniffing dogs

Vapor wake canine deployed by the NYPD in NYC subway corridors at 42nd Street–Port Authority Bus Terminal

Vapor wake canines are dogs that have been trained to alert their human handlers to the presence of explosive threats so that they can be stopped before they become a danger, and these dogs can track explosive trails to potential bombers.
