= Dermot Shea =

American police officer

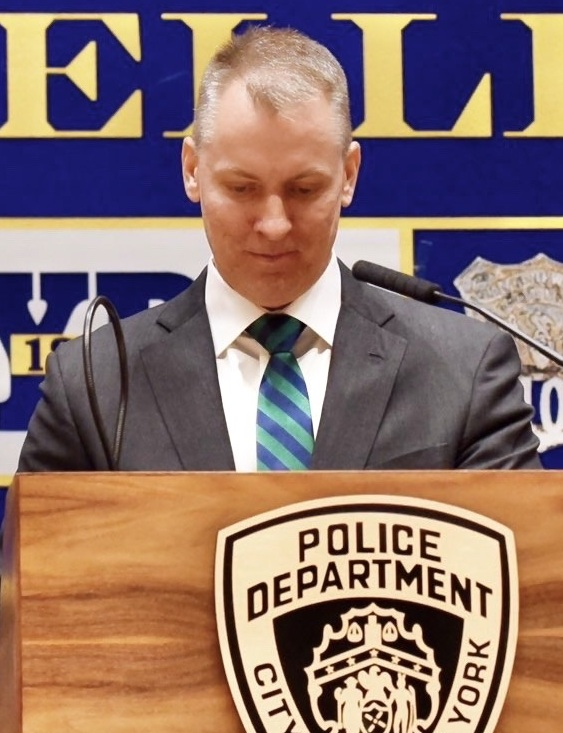
- Commissioner's swearing-in ceremony, December 2, 2019

44th Police Commissioner of New York City
- In office December 1, 2019 – December 31, 2021
- Mayor: Bill de Blasio
- Preceded by: James P. O'Neill
- Succeeded by: Keechant Sewell

New York Police Department Chief of Detectives
- In office April 16, 2018 – November 30, 2019
- Appointed by: James P. O'Neill
- Preceded by: Robert K. Boyce
- Succeeded by: Rodney K. Harrison

Personal details
- Born: Dermot Francis Shea; May 24, 1969 (age 57) New York City, New York, U.S.
- Party: Republican
- Education: State University of New York at Oneonta (BA)

Dermot Francis Shea (born May 24, 1969) is an American retired police officer who was the 44th New York City Police Commissioner. He assumed the position on December 1, 2019, and was sworn in by Mayor Bill de Blasio in a public ceremony on December 2.

== Early life and education ==
Shea's parents were Irish immigrants. His father was a handyman, and his mother was a housewife. At one point he, his parents and siblings all shared a one-bedroom apartment in Sunnyside, Queens. He graduated from Xavier High School in Manhattan in 1986, and earned a Bachelor of Science degree in business economics from the State University of New York at Oneonta.

== Career ==
Shea started his career in law enforcement with his appointment to the New York City Police Academy in late 1990. After graduating in the top 10% of his academy class, he was sworn in as a Police Officer in April 1991 and assigned to the South Bronx.

As a deputy chief in 2013, he quashed an internal investigation into a sergeant with whom he had a mentoring relationship, Juan Duque, and that sergeant's brother, Ruben Duque. Both had defrauded the department of overtime hours and illegally taken patrol cars home. The story didn't become public until 2018. On November 4, 2019, it was publicly announced that Dermot F. Shea would become the 44th commissioner of the NYPD.

In April 2014, he was appointed deputy commissioner of operations by then commissioner William Bratton. Prior to this appointment, he had been a chief commanding the Office of the Deputy Commissioner for Operations. He also commanded the 44th and 50th precincts and the Patrol Borough Bronx Anti-Crime Unit.

On April 16, 2018, Shea was promoted to chief of detectives.

As Commissioner of the NYPD, Shea stated in public testimony on June 22, 2020 that NYPD officers who had driven into protesters did not use excessive force and said that the officers who were in the vehicle were being "set upon and attacked, and thankfully they were able to get out of that situation with, to my knowledge, no injuries to anyone." He also said in the public testimony that "Our internal affairs bureau investigated this information and preliminarily we have an accounting of that incident where we have officers in a situation where they're essentially being penned in by protesters." Contrary to video allegations provided by The New York Times, "Police Commissioner Dermot F. Shea has maintained that misconduct during the protests was confined to 'isolated cases' and that officers were confronted with violence by protesters."

On January 1, 2022, Keechant Sewell succeeded Shea as New York City's police commissioner, when Eric Adams succeeded de Blasio as mayor.

== Dates of rank ==
Sworn in as a Patrolman – 1991
Promoted to sergeant – 1994
Promoted to lieutenant – 1999
Promoted to captain – 2003
Promoted to deputy inspector – 2008
Promoted to inspector – 2010
Promoted to deputy chief – 2013
Deputy commissioner of operations – 2014
Designated chief of crime control strategies – January 1, 2017
Promoted to chief of detectives – 2018
New York City Police Commissioner – December 1, 2019

Police appointments
Preceded by James P. O'Neill	New York City Police Commissioner; 2019–2021	Succeeded by Keechant Sewell
