= List of vehicles of the New York City Police Department =

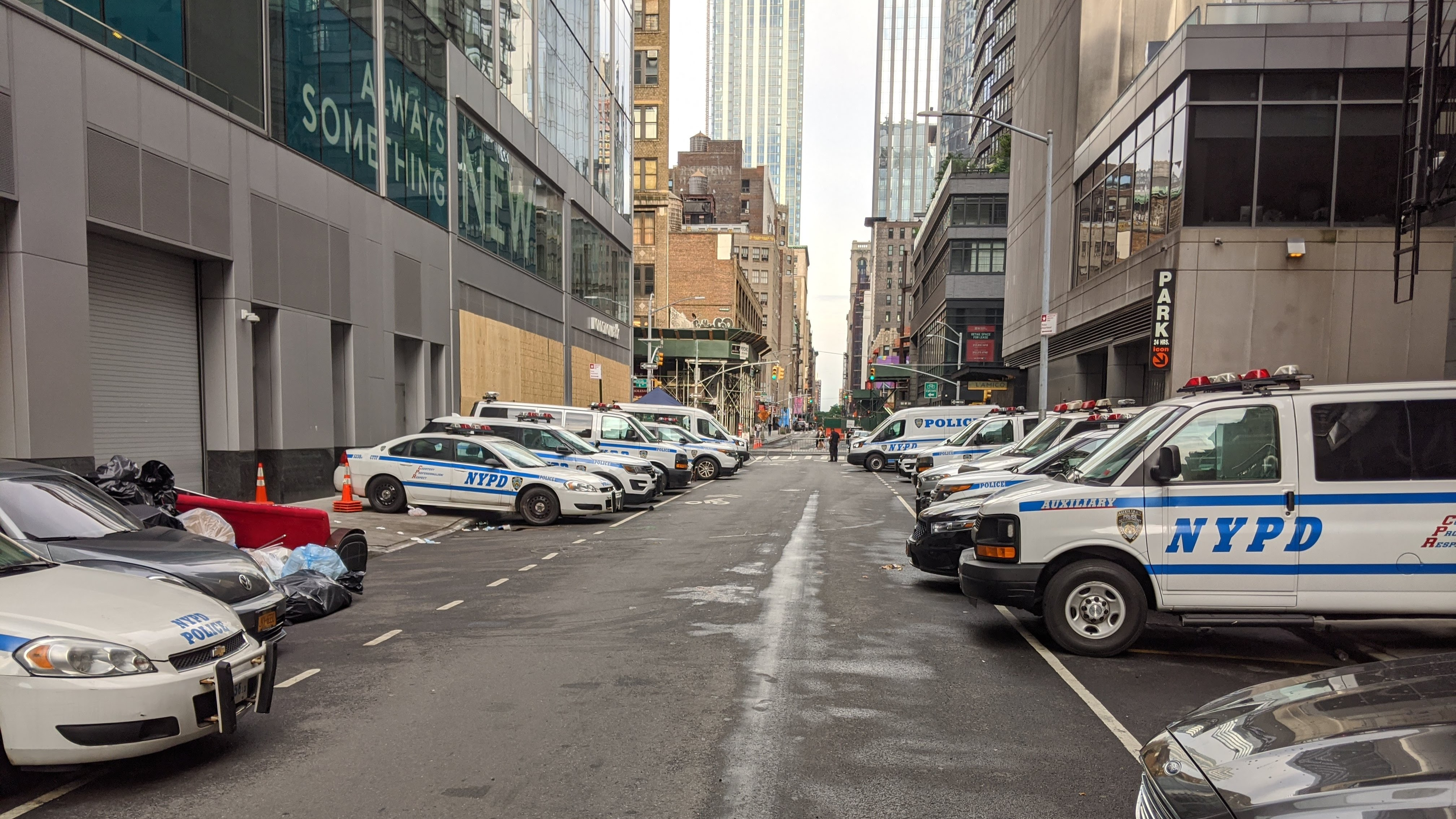
Various New York City Police Department vehicles parked on West 30th Street during the George Floyd protests in June 2020

As of June 2026, the New York City Police Department vehicle fleet consists of 9,005 police vehicles, including various cars and trucks, 11 boats and eight helicopters.

== Liveries ==
The colors of NYPD vehicles are usually an all-white body with two blue stripes along each side. The word "POLICE" is printed in small text above the front wheel wells, and as "NYPD Police" above the front grille. The NYPD patch is emblazoned on both sides, either on or just forward of the front doors. The letters "NYPD" are printed in blue Rockwell Extra Bold italic font on the front doors, and the NYPD motto "Courtesy, Professionalism, Respect" is printed on the rear ones. The unit's shop number is printed on the rear decklid. The shop number is also printed on the rear side panels above the gas intake, along with the number of the unit's assigned precinct. This design was introduced in 1996 by Police Commissioner Howard Safir alongside a fleet of new Ford Crown Victoria Police Interceptors for cost-saving reasons to replace a blue body and white striped livery in use with modifications since 1973; originally, this livery was to feature two thinner stripes with dark green outlines and "NYPD Police" text in a different italic font before it was amended to its current form.

In 2023, Police Commissioner Keechant Sewell introduced a new design along with new 360-degree camera systems for all patrol cars. The new graphics package would pay homage to the NYPD's flag, with five green and white stripes on the background to signify the five boroughs of the city with a dark blue Canton of 24 stars, each representing a village that was absorbed by the City of New York. The motto of "Courtesy, Professionalism, Respect" was also removed. The rollout of the design was anticipated to be completed by 2024, but the NYPD again changed the design of their vehicles before the rollout was complete. This came at a significant cost to taxpayers.

=== Unmarked vehicles ===
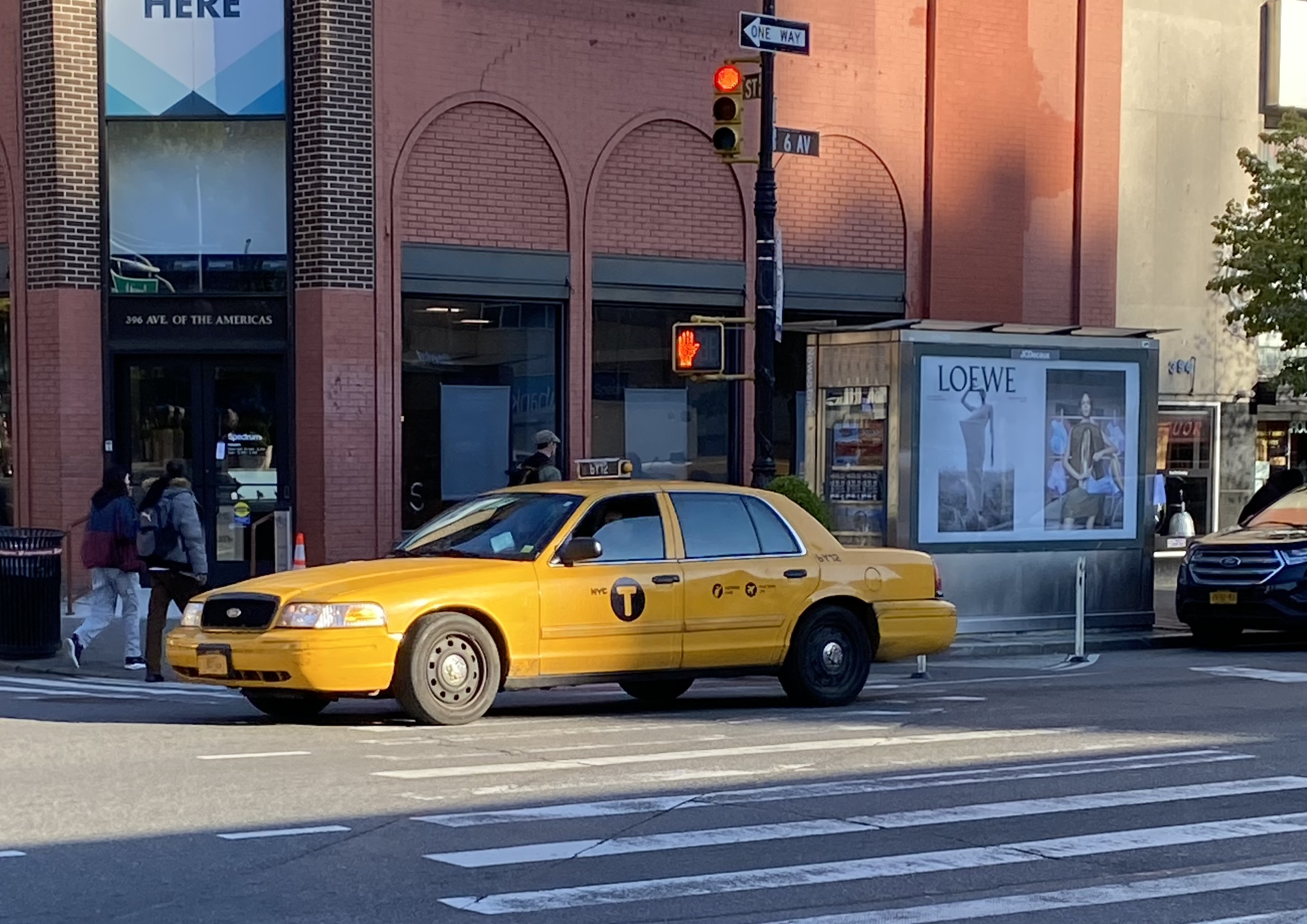
Undercover Ford Crown Victoria disguised as a New York City taxi

The NYPD fleet also has many makes and models of unmarked vehicles. Some units will be assigned normal police unmarked vehicles, while detectives, vice, special investigations, etc., may be assigned vehicles that are hard to distinguish from a regular car.

The NYPD maintains a fleet of at least five undercover cars designed to appear as conventional yellow New York City taxis. As of 2016, these vehicles were issued with medallion numbers usually beginning with either 2W or 6Y.

== Vehicle equipment ==
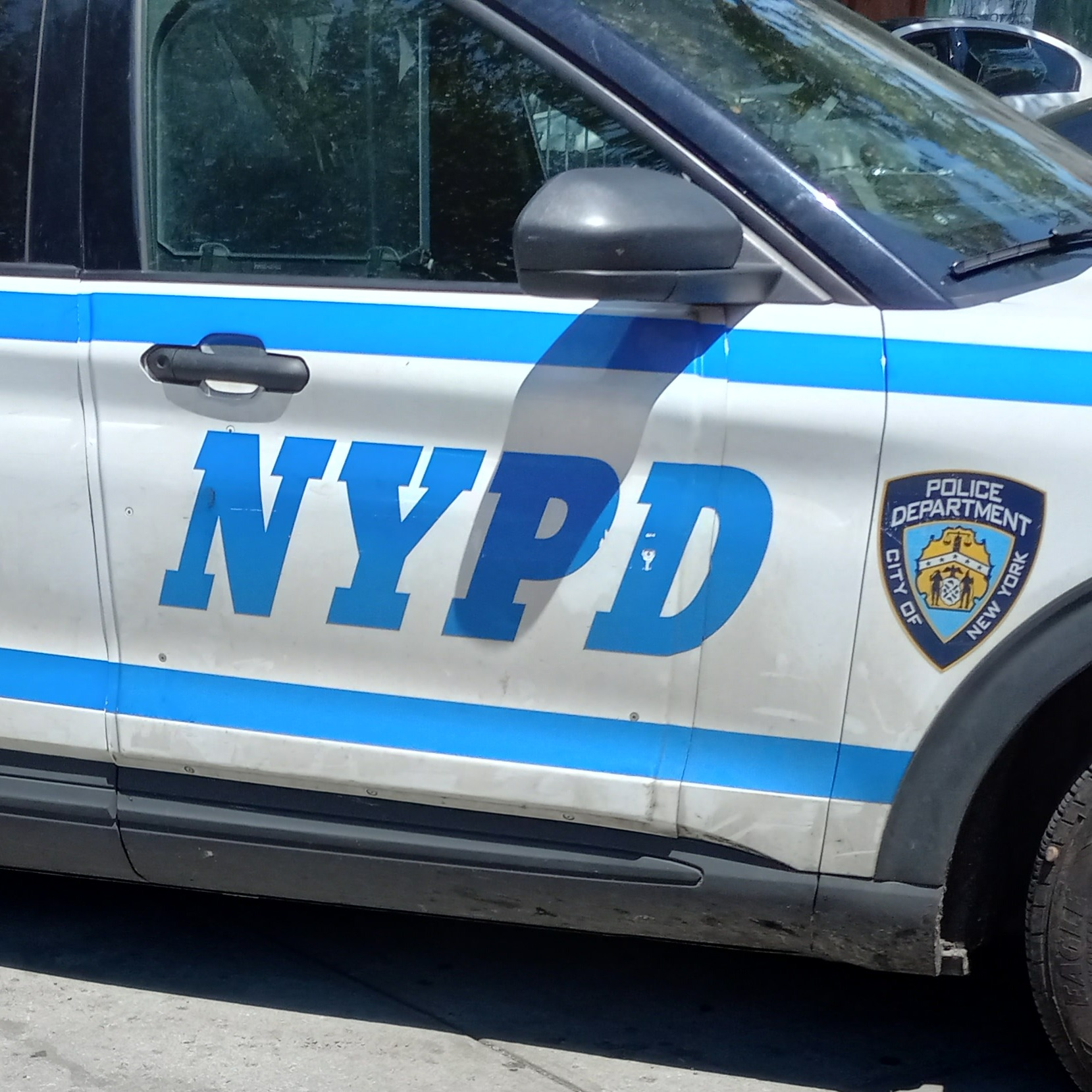
Some NYPD vehicles, such as this Ford Police Interceptor Utility, are equipped with bullet-resistant window inserts and door panels

From 2011 onwards, NYPD vehicles began to be equipped with amplified low-frequency Federal Signal rumbler sirens, following a successful two-year pilot program conducted by the force.

Following the killings of officers Rafael Ramos, Wenjian Liu and Brian Moore in 2014 and 2015 respectively, all shot while in their patrol cars, marked and unmarked NYPD vehicles began to be equipped or retrofitted with ballistic plating built into their front doors. In January 2017, the NYPD also began installing two-piece bullet-resistant window inserts alongside these ballistic panels.

== Police cars ==
Vehicle	Country	Image	Notes
2020–21 Tesla Model 3	United States		250 purchased in a five-year contract for $12.4 million; Primarily in service with the Highway Patrol; at precincts in small numbers
2018 Toyota Camry	United States		Used primarily with Traffic Enforcement, but unmarked taxis were used by the Anti-Crime Unit
2017 & 2023 Chevrolet Bolt	South Korea (origin); United States (manufacture)		Limited use with School Safety and Traffic Enforcement; 2023 model shown at the NY International Auto Show 2023
2016–20 Dodge Charger Pursuit	Canada		Only used by Highway Patrol and the Detective Bureau
2016 Ford C-Max	United States		Hybrid; Only used by Traffic Enforcement
2015–17 Smart Fortwo	Germany (origin); France (manufacture)		Approximately 200 purchased to replace Go-4 Interceptors; Mostly used for Park Patrol, traffic control and parking enforcement
2013–19 Ford Taurus Police Interceptor	United States		Used by multiple bureaus as both a marked and unmarked car
2011–15 Toyota Prius	Japan		Hybrid; Only used by Traffic Enforcement
2011 Chevrolet Volt	United States		Plug-in hybrid electric vehicle; Was used by Traffic Enforcement and SEC
2010–12 Ford Fusion; 2013–14 Ford Fusion Hybrid; 2019–20 Ford Police Responder	United States		Used by multiple bureaus as both a marked and unmarked car
2006–11 Chevrolet Impala; 2012–16 Chevrolet Impala; 2014–19 Chevrolet Impala	United States (origin); Canada (manufacture)		Extensive use; 2014–19 Impala used in limited numbers as a unmarked vehicle
2001–11 Ford Crown Victoria Police Interceptor	Canada		Extremely rare; only a limited number remain in active service.
Chevrolet Spark	South Korea		Only used by Traffic Enforcement
=== Withdrawn vehicles ===
Nissan Altima	Japan (origin); United States (manufacture)		40 (18 marked, 22 unmarked) initially purchased for evaluation in 2009 as NYPD's first hybrid patrol cars
2006 Dodge Charger Police Package	United States (origin); Canada (manufacture)		15 Chargers with V8 engines delivered new for Highway Patrol use in 2006; Small quantity of Chargers with V6 engines also delivered for patrol car evaluation
2001–2005 Chevrolet Impala 9C1	United States		
1996–1997 Ford Crown Victoria	Canada		First patrol cars delivered in base white and blue striped livery
1991–1996 Chevrolet Caprice 9C1	United States		Over 1,600 in service by 1996; Last patrol cars delivered in base blue and white striped livery
1988 Ford Mustang GT	United States		Drag racer confiscated in street racing crackdown refitted to NYPD Highway Patrol specification in 1995
1976 Pontiac LeMans	United States		330 purchased in 1976; Initially refused by NYPD due to non-fitment of police package engines and equipment
1976 Pontiac Catalina	United States		25 "Enforcer" models purchased for Highway Patrol in 1976; Initially refused by NYPD due to non-fitment of police package engines and equipment
1976 Pontiac Ventura	United States		76, one for each precinct, purchased to test feasibility of compact cars for police work

== Sport utility vehicles and crossovers ==
Vehicle	Country	Image	Notes
2025– Chevrolet Blazer EV	United States (origin); Mexico (manufacture)		50 purchased for trial in 2025; Only pursuit-rated electric NYPD vehicles as of October 2025
2025– Ford Police Interceptor Utility	United States		150 purchased as of October 2025; all hybrid models, 2024 livery change reverted from these vehicles onward.
2022–23 Ford Mustang Mach-E	United States (origin); Mexico (manufacture)		184 purchased for $11.5M in 2021; approximately 100 in service as of 2024; Precinct patrol, transit bureau, and Traffic Enforcement
2020–24 Ford Police Interceptor Utility	United States		Extensive use in multiple bureaus; Hybrids; intended to have all 10,000 vehicles "green" within five years; Livery changes began in 2024
2019 Chevrolet Traverse	United States		Between 60-100 purchased in 2019 in pilot scheme following discontinuation of Ford Taurus Police Interceptor
2019 Dodge Durango	United States		Marked and unmarked vehicles in very limited numbers
2017 Toyota RAV4	Japan (origin); Canada (manufacture)		Estimated 300 in use; Used by Traffic Enforcement, and as unmarked vehicles
2016–19 Ford Police Interceptor Utility	United States		Extensive use in multiple bureaus; Likely over 9,000 in use
2015 Chevrolet Suburban	United States		Highway Patrol pursuit and K9 Unit; also seen as unmarked for high ranking officers
2015 GMC Yukon Denali	United States		Emergency Service Unit, Transit Bureau, Bomb Squad; other law enforcement organizations such as the New York City Sheriff's Office
2014 Ford Escape	United States		
2009–12 Ford Escape Hybrid	United States		Patrol and Traffic Enforcement
2010–15 (two separate generations) Ford Edge	United States (origin); Canada (manufacture)		Used as an unmarked vehicle
=== Withdrawn vehicles ===
2008–2010 GMC Yukon Hybrid	United States		

== Vans ==
Vehicle	Country	Image	Notes
2016 Ford Transit	United States		Used by multiple bureaus and units
2010–18 Chevrolet Express	United States		110 in use as of 2016: mostly passenger vans, but a limited number of cargo vans; Personnel or prisoner transport; used by most precincts and multiple bureaus
2008–16 Freightliner Sprinter	Germany (origin); United States (manufacture)		Used by multiple bureaus and units, including Strategic Response Group and Emergency Service Unit
2008–10 Ford E-Series	United States		Personnel or prisoner transport; Includes pop-up 4x4 mobile surveillance vans

== Pickup and medium-sized trucks ==
Vehicle	Country	Image	Notes
2019 Lenco BearCat	United States		Armored Vehicle; Five in use by the Emergency Service Unit
2017 Ford F-550 (modified)	United States		Emergency Service Unit Radio Emergency Patrol
2016–18 Chevrolet Silverado	United States		Most used by the Mounted Unit, Highway Patrol, and Emergency Service Unit
2014–15 Ford F-550XL Super Duty tow truck	United States		Used by Traffic Enforcement for towing disabled and impounding illegally parked vehicles
2014 Ford F-450 ambulance	United States		Used by the Emergency Service Unit; There is also a black livery variant
2011–16 Ford Super Duty (F-150, -250, -350 & -550)	United States		Primarily used by Emergency Service Unit, Traffic, Transit Bureau, Highway Patrol, and Police Academy Driver Training unit
Chevrolet P30 van	United States		Communications post

== Large trucks ==
Vehicle	Country	Image	Notes
2016 Technical Assistance Response Unit	United States		Used by the Technical Assistance Response Team
2008 International MRAP	United States		Awarded through the 1033 program
2008 International tow truck	United States		Used by Traffic Enforcement
2007 Ferrara rescue truck (modified)	United States		Emergency Service Unit Radio Emergency Patrol
2001 Freightliner fuel truck	United States		Used by the Aviation Unit for refueling helicopters; Located at Floyd Bennett Field
International DuraStar 4300	United States		Used by the Emergency Service Unit
Lenco B.E.A.R.	United States		Armored Vehicle; One in use by the Emergency Service Unit
Mack M-series rescue truck	United States		ESU Heavy Rescue Truck
GMC C6500 flatbed	United States		Cargo & equipment transport
Kenworth T700 chassis flatbed	United States		Cargo & equipment transport
=== Withdrawn vehicles ===
AM General M35 series truck	United States		Awarded through 1033 program; In storage at Floyd Bennett Field
Hummer H1 (modified)	United States		Formerly used for crowd control
Lenco Peacekeeper	United States		Armored Vehicle; Two formerly used by the ESU

== Buses and communications vans ==
Vehicle	Country	Image	Notes
2017 Farber Glaval	United States		Based on a Freightliner platform; Used by Patrol Bureau Manhattan South
2015–16 International	United States		Used by the Information Technology Bureau (Communications Division)
2015 International 3300 (chassis)/ IC CE (body)	United States		
International (chassis)/ Blue Bird (body)	United States		
Blue Bird All American bus (modified)	United States		Communications Division Command Post
Freightliner MT55/ LDV Custom Specialty Vehicles	United States		Communications Division Command Post
=== Withdrawn vehicles ===
Orion V Suburban	Canada (origin); United States (manufacture)		
TMC/Nova Bus RTS	United States		Replaced by newer models

== Miscellaneous vehicles ==
Vehicle	Country	Image	Notes
2017-2020 Fuji Bikes 3-XT	United States		Used by the Bike Patrol unit of the Strategic Response Group; Sales to NYPD were suspended by Fuji Bikes in 2020 due to use against protesters during the George Floyd protests in New York City
2015–20 Harley-Davidson Electra Glide	United States		Highway Patrol
John Deere Gator	United States		Auxiliary support; Used by Emergency Service Unit, Counterterrorism Division, Aviation Unit and for beach patrols
T3 Motion Patroller	United States		Tri-wheeled scooter
=== Withdrawn vehicles ===
Cushman Truckster	United States		Parking enforcement
Go-4 Interceptor	Canada		Patrol and parking enforcement

== Aircraft ==
Vehicle	Country	Image	Notes
=== Helicopters ===
2014–15 Bell 429 GlobalRanger	United States		Patrol; 4 in fleet; serial numbers 57148, 57188, 57220 & 57233
Bell 412EP	United States		Utility, rescue and counter-terrorism
Bell 407	United States		Training; Serial number 53061
AgustaWestland AW119 Koala	Italy		NYPD helicopter N319PD.jpg
=== Fixed-wing ===
Cessna 208 Caravan	United States		Surveillance, counter-terrorism

== See also ==
- Police vehicles in the United States and Canada
