= New York City Police Department =

American municipal police force

City of New York Police Department
- Patch

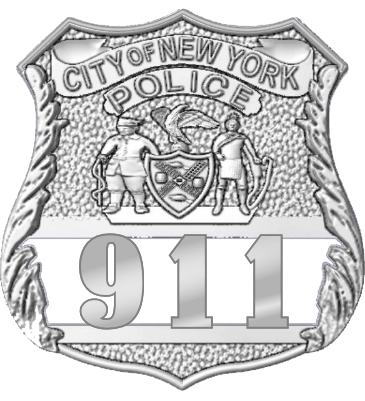
- NYPD shield (officer)

- Flag of the NYPD
- Common name: New York City Police Department
- Abbreviation: NYPD
- Motto: Fidelis ad Mortem (Latin for 'Faithful Unto Death')

Agency overview
- Formed: May 23, 1845; 181 years ago
- Employees: 48,967 (FY 2026)
- Annual budget: $6.43 billion (FY 2026)

Jurisdictional structure
- Legal jurisdiction: As per operations jurisdiction
- General nature: Local civilian police

Operational structure
- Headquarters: One Police Plaza, Lower Manhattan
- Sworn officers: ▼33,503 of 35,025 (FY 2026)
- Civilian employees: Approximately 19,000 civilian employees
- Police Commissioner responsible: Jessica Tisch
- Agency executives: Tania Kinsella, First Deputy Police Commissioner; Michael LiPetri, Chief of Department
- Units: List of units: Anti-Crime Unit; Aviation Unit; Ceremonial Unit; Chaplains Unit; Citywide Counterterrorism Unit; Crimes Against Persons Unit; Crime Scene Unit; Disorder Control Unit; Domestic Violence Unit; Emergency Services Unit; Executive Protection Unit; Harbor Unit; Hate Crimes Unit; Mounted Unit; Movie and T.V. Unit; Paid Detail Unit; Special Investigations Unit; Special Victims Unit; Technical Assistance and Response Unit (TARU)

Facilities
- Commands: 9 borough commands: 78 precincts; 12 transit districts; 9 housing police service areas
- Police vehicles: 9,624
- Police boats: 29
- Helicopters: 8
- Horses: 35
- K-9 units: 34

Website
- nyc.gov/nypd nypdonline.org

The City of New York Police Department, also known as the New York City Police Department (NYPD), is the primary law enforcement agency within New York City as per the NYC Charter. Established on May 23, 1845, NYPD is the largest, and one of the oldest, municipal police departments in the United States.

The NYPD is headquartered at 1 Police Plaza, located on Park Row in Lower Manhattan near City Hall. The NYPD's regulations are compiled in title 38 of the New York City Rules. Dedicated units of the NYPD include the Emergency Service Unit, K-9, harbor patrol, highway patrol, air support, bomb squad, counterterrorism, criminal intelligence, anti-organized crime, narcotics, mounted patrol, public transportation, and public housing units. Unlike in other towns and cities, it is not the fire department but the NYPD that has responsibility for emergency water rescue.

The NYPD employs more than 40,000 people, including more than 30,000 police officers as of September 2023. According to the official CompStat database, the NYPD responded to nearly 500,000 reports of crime and made more than 200,000 arrests during 2019. In 2020, it had a budget of US$6 billion. However, the NYPD's actual spending often exceeds its budget.

The NYPD's history has been colored by police brutality, corruption, and misconduct, which critics argue persists till the present day. Due to its high-profile location in New York City, the largest city and media center in the U.S., fictionalized versions of the NYPD and its officers have frequently been portrayed in novels, radio, television, motion pictures, and video games.

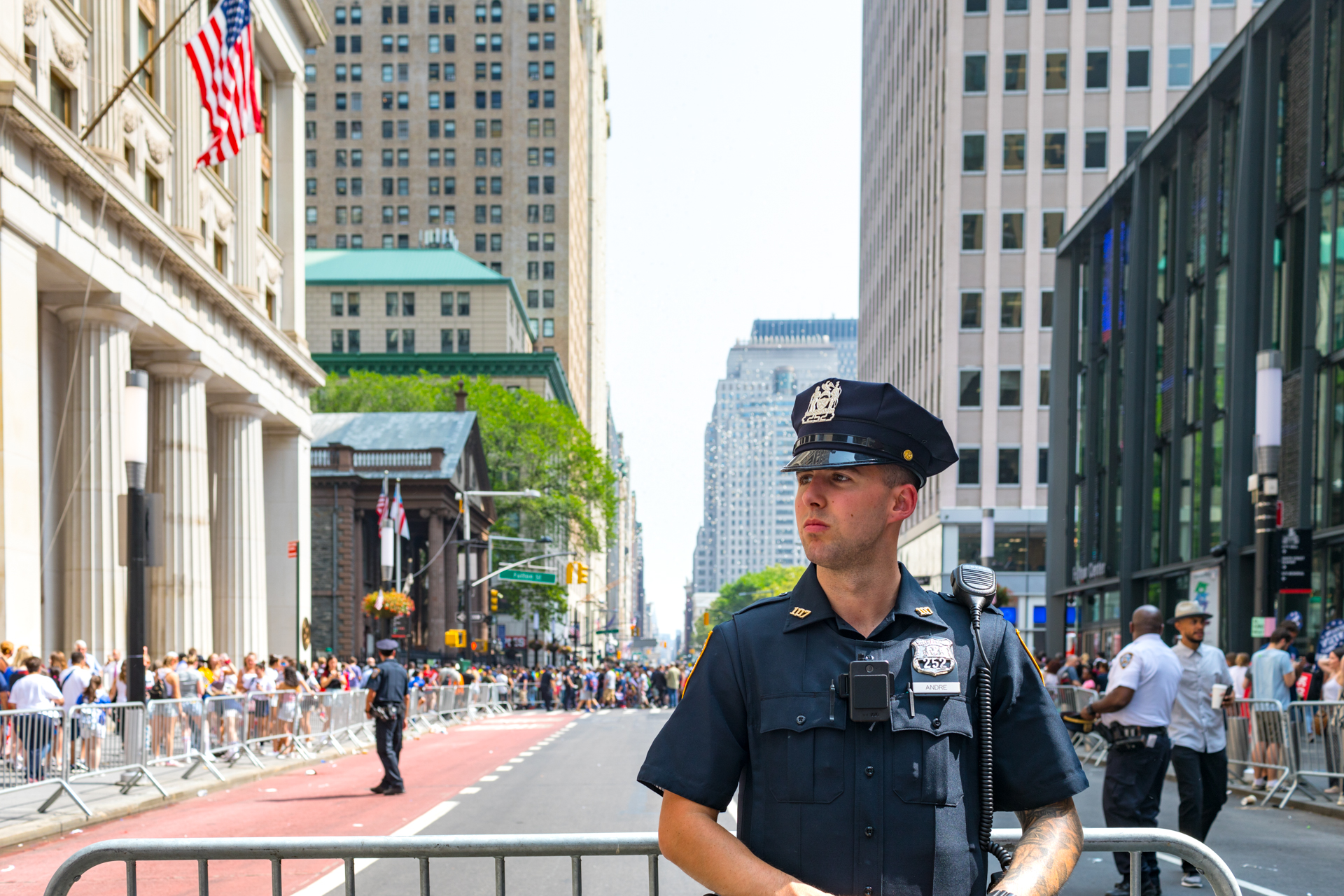
NYPD Police officer in uniform at the US Women's Soccer Team ticker-tape parade in 2019

== History ==
The Municipal Police were established in 1845, replacing an old night watch system. Mayor William Havemeyer shepherded the NYPD together. The NYPD appointed its first Black officer in 1911 and the first female officer in 1918.

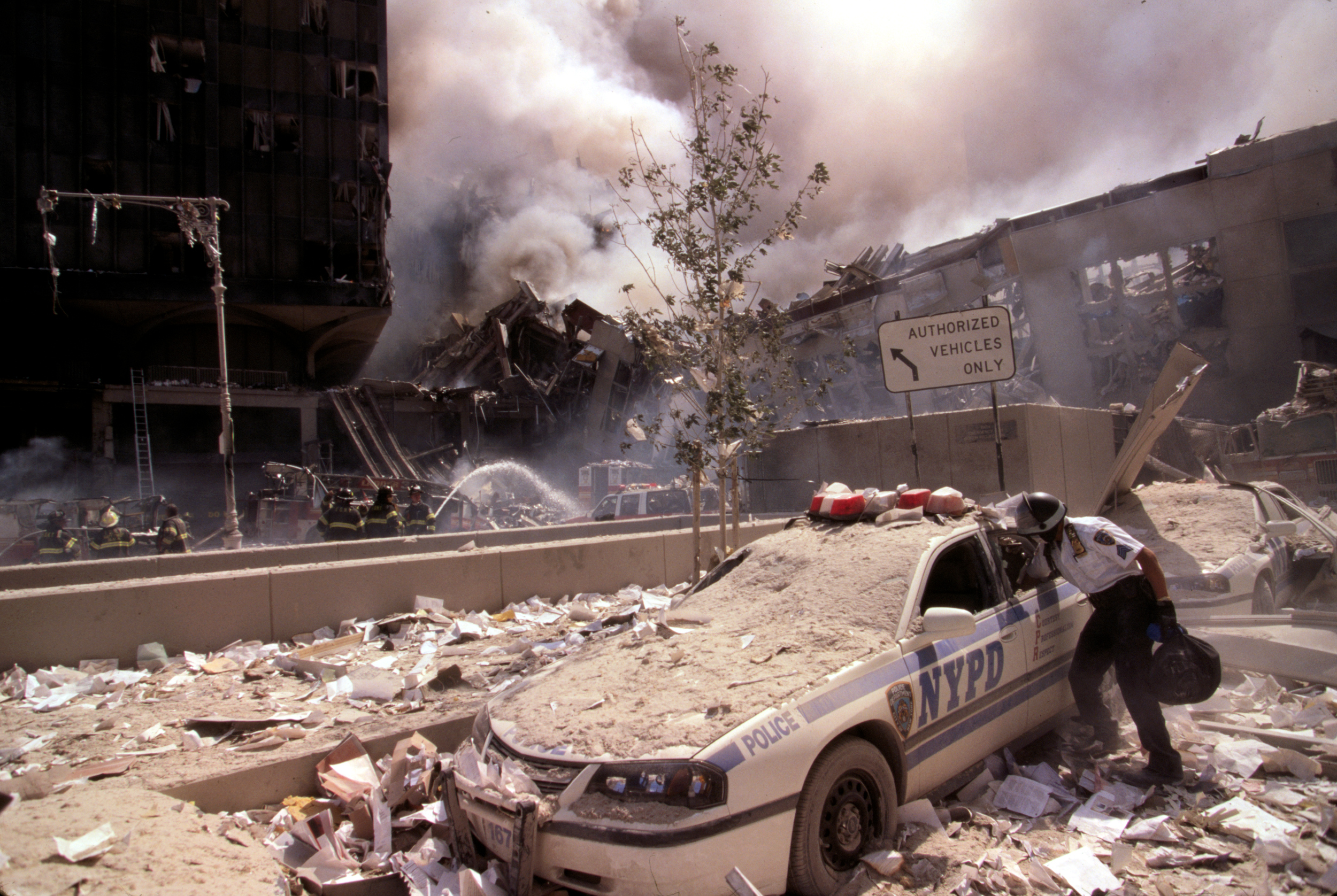
NYPD sergeant searching a cruiser covered in debris during the September 11 attacks

During Richard Enright's tenure as commissioner, the country's first Shomrim Society, a fraternal organization of Jewish police officers, was founded in the NYPD in 1924. At the time, the NYPD had 700 Jewish officers on the force.

In 1961, highly decorated NYPD officer Mario Biaggi, later a US Congressman, became the first police officer in New York State to be made a member of the National Police Officers Hall of Fame. In the mid-1980s, the NYPD began to police street-level drug markets much more intensively, leading to a sharp increase in incarceration.

In 1992, Mayor David Dinkins created an independent Civilian Complaint Review Board for the NYPD. In response to this, some NYPD officers violently protested and rioted. They blocked traffic on the Brooklyn Bridge, demonstrated at City Hall and shouted racial epithets. The protests were sponsored by the NYPD union.

In 1994, the NYPD developed the CompStat computer system for tracking crime geographically, which is now in use by other police departments in the United States and Canada. Research is mixed on whether CompStat had an impact on crime rates. Throughout the mid to late 1990s, several mergers took place which changed the landscape of policing in New York City. The New York City Transit Police and the New York City Housing Authority Police Department merged into the NYPD in 1995, becoming the Transit Bureau and Housing Bureau respectively. In 1996, the New York City Department of Transportation's Traffic Operations Bureau was merged into the NYPD, becoming the Transportation Bureau. In 1998, the New York City Department of Education's School Safety Division became part of the NYPD's Community Affairs Bureau.

In 2021, the NYPD ceased enforcement of marijuana crimes other than driving under the influence.

In 2024, the NYPD changed its motto from "Courtesy, Professionalism, Respect" to "Fighting Crime, Protecting the Public".

== Organization and structure ==
The department is administered and governed by the police commissioner, who is appointed by the mayor. Technically, the commissioner serves a five-year term; as a practical matter, they serve at the mayor's pleasure. The commissioner in turn appoints the first deputy commissioner, several deputy commissioners, and the chief of department (the most senior uniformed officer). By default, the commissioner and their subordinate deputies are civilians under an oath of office and are not sworn officers. However, a commissioner who comes up from the sworn ranks retains the status and statutory powers of a police officer while serving as commissioner. This affects their police pensions, and their ability to carry a firearm without a pistol permit. Some police commissioners carry a personal firearm but also have a full-time security detail. Commissioners and deputy commissioners are administrators who specialize in areas of great importance to the Department, such as counterterrorism, support services, public information, legal matters, intelligence, and information technology. However, as civilian administrators, deputy commissioners are prohibited from taking operational control of a police situation (the commissioner and the first deputy commissioner may take control of these situations, however). Within the rank structure, there are also designations, known as "grades", that connote differences in duties, experience, and pay. However, supervisory functions are generally reserved for the rank of sergeant and above.

=== Office of the Chief of Department ===
The chief of department serves as the senior sworn member of the NYPD. Before 1987, the rank was known as the chief of operations, and, before that, chief inspector. Michael LiPetri currently serves as chief of department.

=== Previous chiefs of department ===
- John Timoney, 1994–1995
- Louis R. Anemone, 1995–1999 (Originally instituted weekly CompStat meetings, which started in the Chief of Patrol's office; Anemone was Chief of Patrol from 1994 to 1995; CompStat moved to the Chief of Department's office when William Bratton promoted Anemone to Chief of Department where it remains today in the Crime Control Strategies Unit office under the Chief's command.)
- Joseph Dunne, 1999–2000
- Joseph Esposito, 2000–2013 (Longest-serving chief of department in history)
- Philip Banks, 2013–2014
- James O'Neill, 2014–2016
- Carlos M. Gomez, 2016–2017
- Terence Monahan, 2018–2021
- Rodney Harrison, 2021
- Kenneth Corey, 2022
- Jeffrey Maddrey, 2022–2024
- John Chell, 2025
- Michael LiPetri, 2025–present

=== Crime Control Strategies chiefs ===
- Jack Maple, first person appointed as Deputy Commissioner of Operations and Crime Control Strategies (1994–1996), creator of CompStat
- Edward Norris, Deputy Commissioner (1996–2000)
- Garry McCarthy, Deputy Commissioner (2000–2006)
- Phil Pulaski, Deputy Commissioner (2006–2009)
- Patrick Timlin, Deputy Commissioner (2010–2012)
- John Bilich, Deputy Commissioner (2012–2014)
- Dermot Shea, Deputy Commissioner and Chief of Crime Control Strategies (2014–2018)
- Lori Pollack, Chief of Crime Control Strategies (2018–2019)
- Michael LiPetri, Chief of Crime Control Strategies (2019-2025)
- Francis Giordano, Chief of Crime Control Strategies (2025–present)

=== Bureaus ===
The department is divided into several bureaus and bureau-equivalent offices which are typically commanded by a uniformed bureau chief (such as the chief of patrol and the chief of transit) or a civilian deputy commissioner (such as the Deputy Commissioner of Support Services). The bureaus fit under four umbrellas: Patrol, Transit & Housing, Investigative, and Administrative. Bureaus are often subdivided into smaller divisions and units. All deputy commissioners report directly to the commissioner and bureau chiefs report to the commissioner through the chief of department.

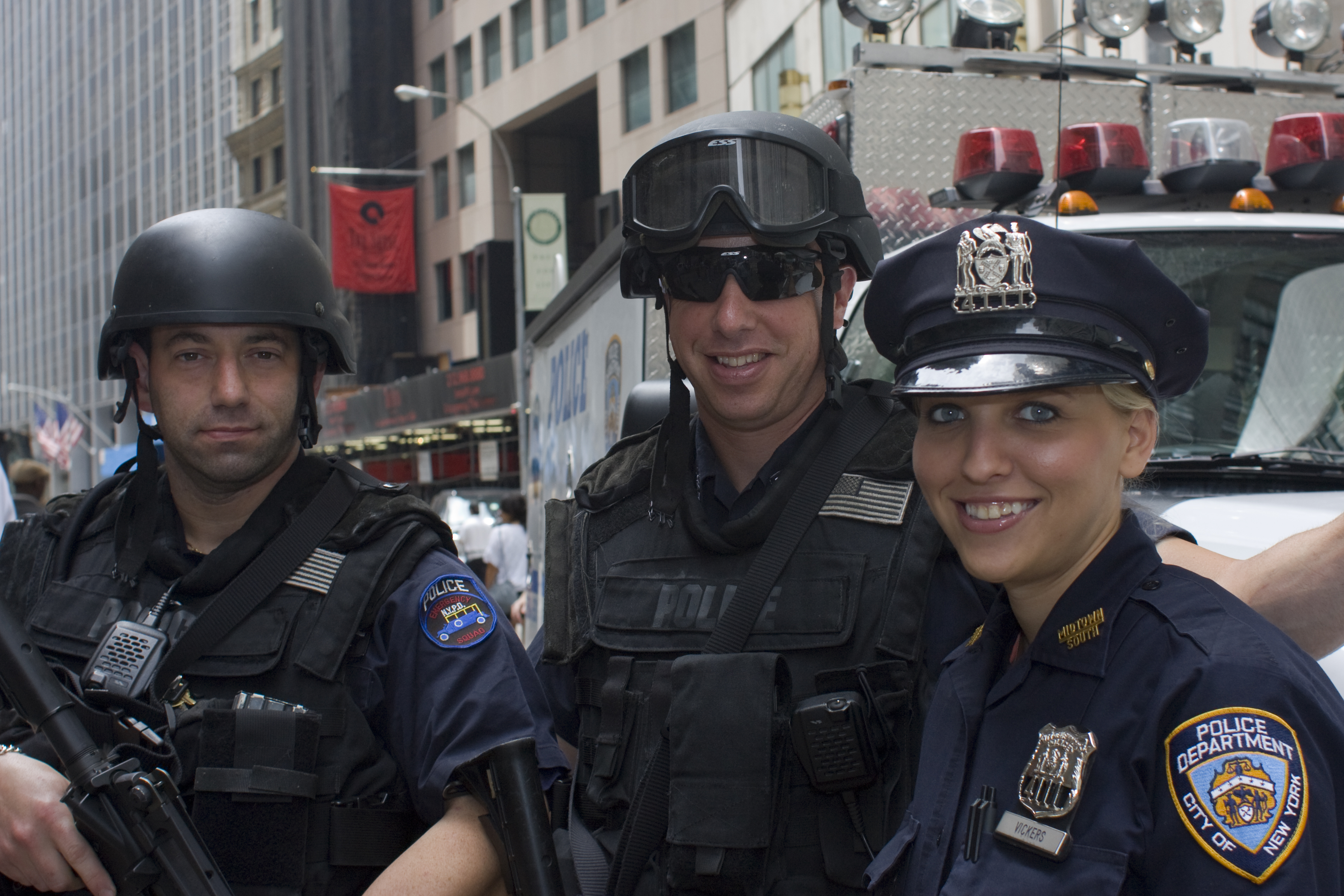
Officers from the Emergency Service Unit

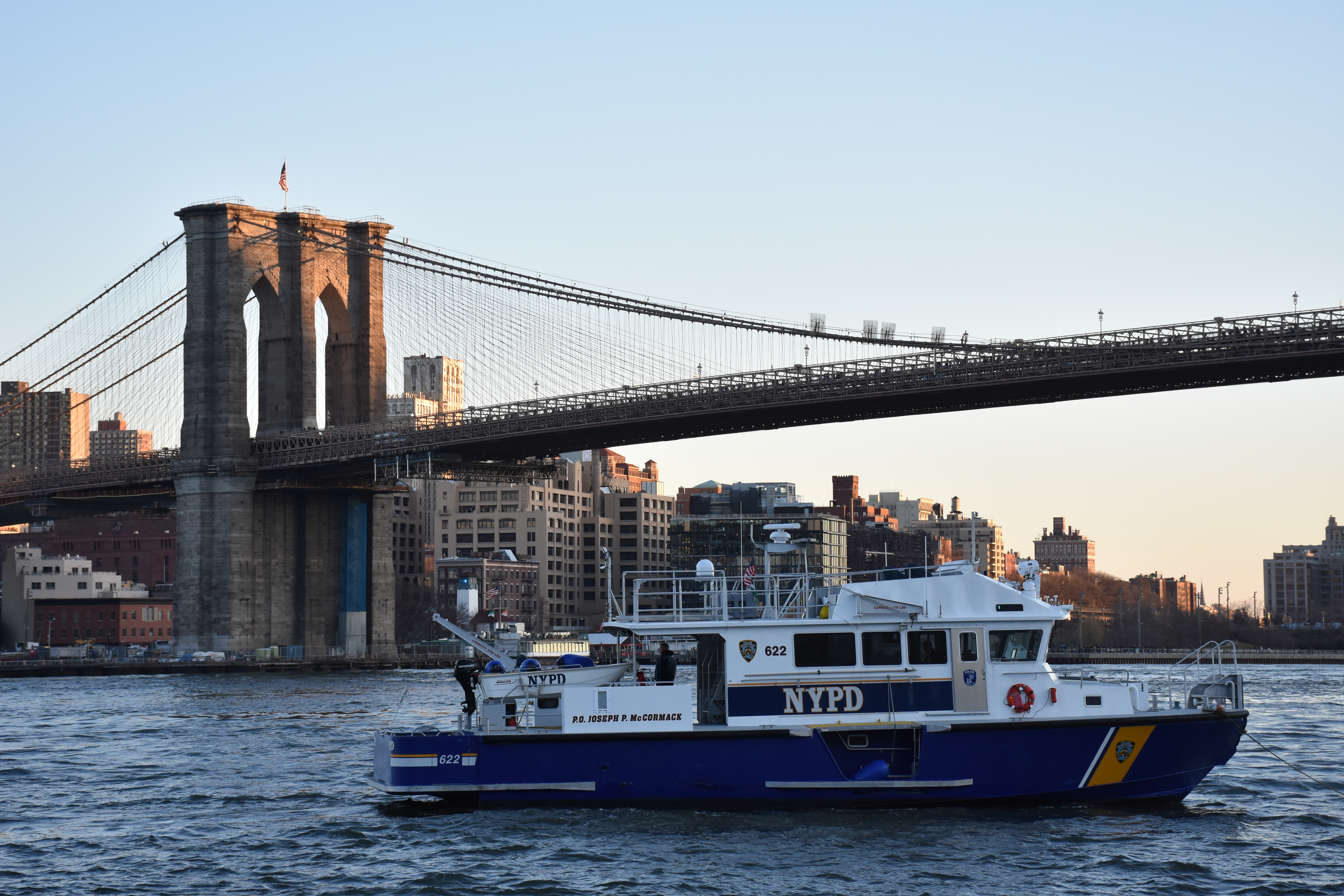
Police boat patrolling the East River

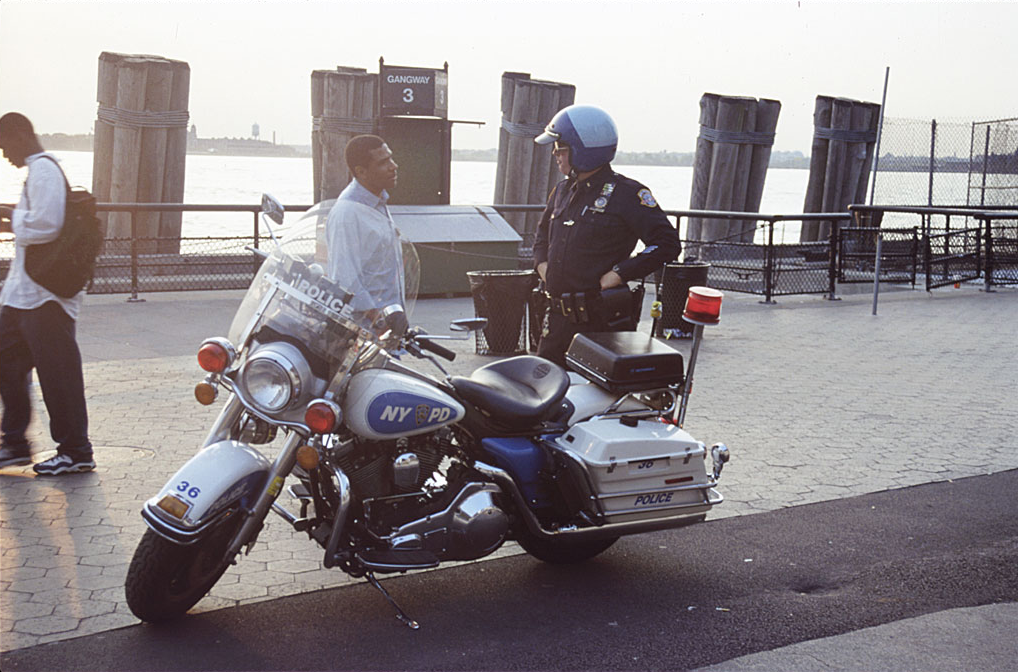
A Highway Patrol officer speaks with a passerby

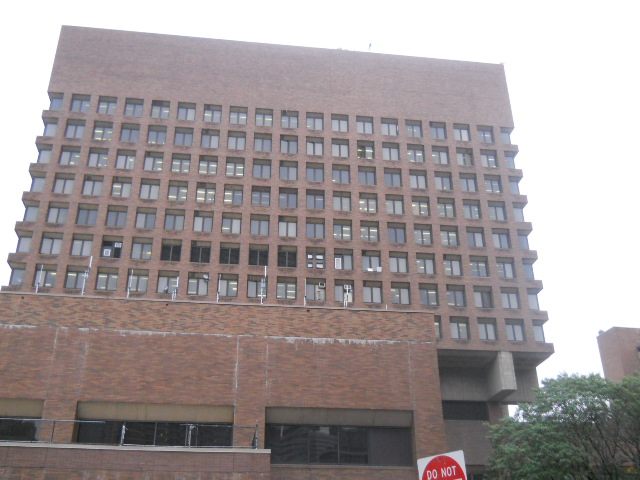
1 Police Plaza, NYPD headquarters

Bureau	Commanding officer	Description	Subdivisions
Patrol Services	Chief of Patrol	The Patrol Services Bureau oversees most of the NYPD's uniformed patrol officers. This is the largest bureau. It is under the command of the Chief of Patrol.	There are nine patrol borough commands (Manhattan North & South, Bronx North & South, Brooklyn North & South, Queens North & South, and Staten Island), with each command headed by an assistant chief. These are further divided into 78 police precincts, which are commanded by a captain, deputy inspector, or inspector; depending on size.
Special Operations	Chief of Special Operations	The Special Operations Bureau manages NYPD responses to major events and incidents that require specifically trained and equipped personnel. It is under the command of the Chief of Special Operations.	The Special Operations Bureau is responsible for the Emergency Service Unit, Aviation Unit, Harbor Unit, Mounted Unit, Strategic Response Group, Crisis Outreach and Support Unit.
Transit	Chief of Transit	The Transit Bureau oversees NYPD transit officers in the New York City Subway. It is under the command of the Chief of Transit.	This bureau is responsible for 12 transit districts, each located within or adjacent to the subway system, and overseen by three borough commands: Manhattan, Brooklyn, and Bronx/Queens. Specialized units within the Transit Bureau include Borough Task Forces, Anti-Terrorism Unit, Citywide Vandals Task Force, Canine Unit, Special Projects Unit, and MetroCard Fraud Task Force.
Housing	Chief of Housing	The Housing Bureau oversees law enforcement within New York City public housing. It is under the command of the Chief of Housing.	There are nine police service areas, each covering a collection of public housing developments.
Transportation	Chief of Transportation	The Transportation Bureau oversees highway patrol and traffic management in New York City. It is under the command of the Chief of Transportation.	Traffic Management Center, Highway District, Traffic Operations District, Traffic Enforcement District
Counterterrorism	Deputy Chief of Counterterrorism	The Counterterrorism Bureau counters, investigates, analyzes, and prevents terrorism in New York City. It is under the command of the Deputy Chief of Counterterrorism, who is subordinate to the Deputy Commissioner of Intelligence & Counterterrorism.	Critical Response Command, Counterterrorism Division, Terrorism Threat Analysis Group, Lower Manhattan Security Initiative, World Trade Center Command
Detective	Chief of Detectives	The Detectives Bureau oversees NYPD detectives. The Detectives are in charge of preventing, detecting, and investigating crime in New York City. It is under the command of the Chief of Detectives.	There is a detective squad for every precinct. These squads are overseen by 9 Detective Borough Commands. Each borough command also operates borough-wide detective squads for serious crimes like homicide and narcotics. The bureau also includes special citywide investigative commands like the Special Victims Division, Forensic Investigations Division, Special Investigations Division, Criminal Enterprise Division, Fugitive Enforcement Division, Real Time Crime Center, Central Robbery Division, District Attorneys Squads, Grand Larceny Division, Gun Violence Suppression Division, Vice Enforcement Division, and the Domestic Violence Unit.
Intelligence	Assistant Chief of Intelligence	The Intelligence Bureau oversees the collection and analysis of data to detect and disrupt criminal and terrorist activity in New York City. It is under the command of the Assistant Chief of Intelligence, who is subordinate to the Deputy Commissioner of Intelligence & Counterterrorism.	Intelligence Operations and Analysis Section, Criminal Intelligence Section
Crime Control Strategies	Chief of Crime Control Strategies	The Crime Control Strategies Bureau oversees the analysis and monitoring of trends across New York City, develops strategies targeted to reduce crime, and applies strategies to the NYPD. It is under the command of the Chief of Crime Control Strategies.	CompStat Unit, Crime Analysis Unit
Community Affairs	Deputy Commissioner of Community Affairs	The Community Affairs Bureau works with community leaders, civic organizations, block associations, and the public to educate on police policies and practices; it is also responsible for NYPD officers in schools and investigates juvenile delinquency. It is under the command of the Deputy Commissioner of Community Affairs.	Community Outreach Division, Crime Prevention Division, Juvenile Justice Division, School Safety Division
Internal Affairs	Chief of Internal Affairs	The Internal Affairs Bureau investigates police misconduct within the NYPD. It is under the command of the Chief of Internal Affairs.	N/A
Personnel	Chief of Personnel	The Personnel Bureau oversees the recruitment and selection of personnel, as well as managing the human resource functions of the NYPD. It is under the command of the Chief of Personnel.	Candidate Assessment Division, Career Enhancement Division, Employee Management Division, Personnel Orders Section, Staff Services Section, Enterprise Risk Management Section, Enterprise Risk Management Civilian Complaint Stat Unit, Early Intervention Unit
Training	Chief of Training	The Training Bureau oversees the training of recruits, officers, staff, and civilians. It is under the command of the Chief of Training.	Recruit Training Section, Physical Training and Tactics Department, Tactical Training Unit, Firearms and Tactics Section, COBRA Training, In-Service Tactical Training Unit, Driver Education and Training Unit, Computer Training Unit, Civilian Training Program, School Safety Training Unit, Instructor Development Unit, Criminal Investigation Course, Leadership Development Section, Citizens Police Academy
Employee Relations	Deputy Commissioner of Employee Relations	Employee Relations oversees the fraternal, religious, and line organizations of the NYPD, as well as ceremonial customs. It is under the command of the Deputy Commissioner of Employee Relations.	Employee Relations Section, Chaplains Unit, Ceremonial Unit, Sports Unit
Information Technology	Deputy Commissioner of Information Technology	The Information Technology Bureau oversees the maintenance, research, development, and implementation of technology to support strategies, programs, and procedures within the NYPD. It is under the command of the Deputy Commissioner of Information Technology who is also known as the Chief Information Officer.	Administration, Fiscal Affairs, Strategic Technology, IT Services Division, Life-Safety Systems, Communications Division
Legal Matters	Deputy Commissioner of Legal Matters	The Legal Matters Bureau assists NYPD personnel regarding department legal matters; controversially, it has a memorandum of understanding with the Manhattan District Attorney to selectively prosecute New York City Criminal Court summons and court cases. It is under the command of the Deputy Commissioner of Legal Matters.	Civil Enforcement Unit, Criminal Section, Civil Section, Legislative Affairs Unit, Document Production/FOIL, Police Action Litigation Section
Public Information	Deputy Commissioner of Public Information	Public Information works with media organizations to provide information to the public. It is under the command of the Deputy Commissioner of Public Information.	Digital Communications Section, Public Information Section
Strategic Initiatives	Deputy Commissioner of Strategic Initiatives	Strategic Initiatives oversees data analysis, department policies, strategic development and the publishing of the department manual which is composed of the Patrol, Administrative, Organization, and Detective Guides. It is under the command of the Deputy Commissioner of Strategic Initiatives.	Office of Management Analysis and Planning (OMAP), Management Orders and Directives Section (MODS), Management Analysis Section (MAS), Office of Research and Evaluation (ORE), Project Management Office (PMO)
Support Services	Deputy Commissioner of Support Services	Support Services Bureau manages equipment, maintenance, and storage, primarily evidence storage and fleet maintenance. It is under the command of the Deputy Commissioner of Support Services.	Fleet Services Division, Property Clerk Division, Central Records Division, Printing Section

== Rank structure ==
Officers graduate from the Police Academy after 26 weeks (or sometimes more) of training in various academic, physical, and tactical fields. For the first 18 months of their careers, they are designated as "Probationary Police Officers" or, more informally, "rookies". There are three career "tracks" in the NYPD: supervisory, investigative, and specialist. The supervisory track consists of nine ranks; promotion to the ranks of sergeant, lieutenant, and captain are made via competitive civil service examinations. After reaching the rank of captain, promotion to the ranks of deputy inspector, inspector, deputy chief, assistant chief, (bureau) chief, and chief of department is always at the discretion of the NYPD commissioner. Promotion from the rank of police officer to detective is discretionary by the police commissioner or required by law when the officer has performed outstanding investigative duty for eighteen months or more.

=== Badges ===
Badges in the New York City Police Department are referred to as "shields" (the traditional term), though not all badge designs are strictly shield-shaped.

Every rank has a different badge design (except "police officer" and "probationary police officer") and, upon change in rank, officers receive a new badge. Lower-ranked police officers are identified by their shield numbers. Lieutenants and above do not have shield numbers and are identified by tax registry numbers.

Some officers carry replica badges, called "dupes", when on patrol as officers are punished for losing their shield by losing up to ten days' pay.

Insignia	Rank	Badge design	Badge color	Badge number	Uniform
	Police Commissioner	With requisite number of stars and rank	Gold, with silver star(s)	No	No uniform
	First Deputy Commissioner	With requisite number of stars and rank	Gold, with silver star(s)	No	No uniform
	Chief of Department	With requisite number of stars and rank	Gold, with silver star(s)	No	White shirt, dark blue peaked cap, velvet cap band, gold hat badge, five gold leaves each side of the cap visor
	Deputy Commissioner (has no operational command; however, has a rank equivalent to a bureau chief)	With requisite number of stars and rank	Gold, with silver star(s)	No	White shirt, dark blue peaked cap, velvet cap band, gold hat badge, five gold leaves each side of the cap visor
	Bureau Chief & Bureau Chief Chaplain †	With requisite number of stars and rank	Gold, with silver star(s)	No	White shirt, dark blue peaked cap, velvet cap band, gold hat badge, five gold leaves each side of the cap visor
	Assistant Chief & Assistant Chief Chaplain †	With requisite number of stars and rank	Gold, with silver star(s)	No	White shirt, dark blue peaked cap, velvet cap band, gold hat badge, five gold leaves each side of the cap visor
	Deputy Chief & Deputy Chief Chaplain †	Chaplain and Surgeon badges differ	Gold, with silver star(s)	No	White shirt, dark blue peaked cap, velvet cap band, gold hat badge, five gold leaves each side of the cap visor
	Inspector & Chaplain †	Chaplain and Surgeon badges differ	Gold	No	White shirt, dark blue peaked cap, velvet cap band, gold hat badge,
	Deputy Inspector		Gold	No	White shirt, dark blue peaked cap, velvet cap band, gold hat badge,
	Captain		Gold	No	White shirt, peaked cap, striped black cap band, gold hat badge
(shoulder & collar)	Lieutenant		Gold	No	White shirt, peaked cap, striped black cap band, gold hat badge
(sleeve)	Sergeant		Gold	Yes	Navy blue shirt, peaked cap, gold hat badge
None	Detective		Gold	Yes	Navy blue shirt, peaked cap, gold hat badge
None	Officer		Silver	Yes, matching hat badge	Navy blue shirt, peaked cap, silver hat badge with matching number
None	Probationary Officer ("probie")		Silver	Yes, matching hat badge	Navy blue shirt, peaked cap, silver hat badge with matching number
None	Recruit		Silver	Yes	Slate grey, black garrison cap
None	Cadet	None			Slate grey, black garrison cap

†: Rank that has no police powers

== Department headcount and demographics ==
As of July 27, 2026, quarterly headcount and demographic data released by the NYPD via New York City Office of Technology and Innovation breaks down the Department's headcount as 33,975 Uniformed Members of Service and 16,012 civilians, and tabulates their ethnic demographics as follows:

Uniformed Members of Service by Rank and Racial Group
Rank	Total	White %	Hispanic %	Black %	Asian	Native American
Police Officer	22,091	29.5%	37.9%	18.8%	13.8%	< 1%
Detective	5,071	49.1%	29.0%	15.8%	6.0%	< 1%
Sergeant	4,419	45.4%	27.7%	13.3%	13.6%	< 1%
Lieutenant	1,606	51.7%	25.2%	11.1%	11.9%	< 1%
Captain	349	41.8%	28.7%	16.9%	12.6%	0%
Deputy Inspector	178	50.6%	18.0%	16.3%	15.2%	0%
Inspector	103	61.2%	14.6%	15.5%	8.7%	0%
Deputy Chief	86	67.4%	17.4%	9.3%	5.8%	0%
Surgeon	33	81.8%	3.0%	6.1%	9.1%	0%
Assistant Chief	28	57.1%	14.3%	28.6%	0.0%	0%
Chief	11	63.6%	18.2%	18.2%	0.0%	0%
Grand Total	33,975	36.0%	34.2%	17.2%	12.5%	< 1%

Civilian Members of Service by Title and Racial Group
Title	Total	Black %	Hispanic %	Asian %	White %	Native American %
Traffic Enforcement Agent	2,783	30.5%	12.9%	50.8%	5.7%	< 1%
School Safety Agent	3,160	64.2%	23.5%	7.5%	4.6%	< 1%
Senior Police Administrative Aide	739	52.2%	20.6%	10.6%	16.4%	< 1%
School Crossing Guard	2,230	33.4%	32.6%	14.3%	19.1%	< 1%
Principal Administrative Associate	283	68.6%	15.9%	5.7%	9.9%	0%
Police Communications Technicians	1,642	65.2%	23.0%	7.2%	4.4%	< 1%
Police Administrative Aide	872	49.8%	22.0%	12.2%	15.5%	< 1%
Other	4,007	33.7%	21.3%	14.7%	30.0%	< 1%
Cadet	296	13.5%	47.3%	30.1%	9.1%	0%
Grand Total	16,012	44.3%	22.4%	18.5%	14.4%	< 1%

=== Place of residence ===
As a rule, NYPD officers can reside in New York City as well as Westchester, Rockland, Orange, Putnam, Suffolk and Nassau counties; approximately half of the sworn force lives outside the city (51% in 2020, up from 42% in 2016). Notably, NYPD officers cannot have their permanent place of residence in neighbouring Northern New Jersey, despite many of the region's residents commuting to NYC for jobs.

=== Women in the NYPD ===
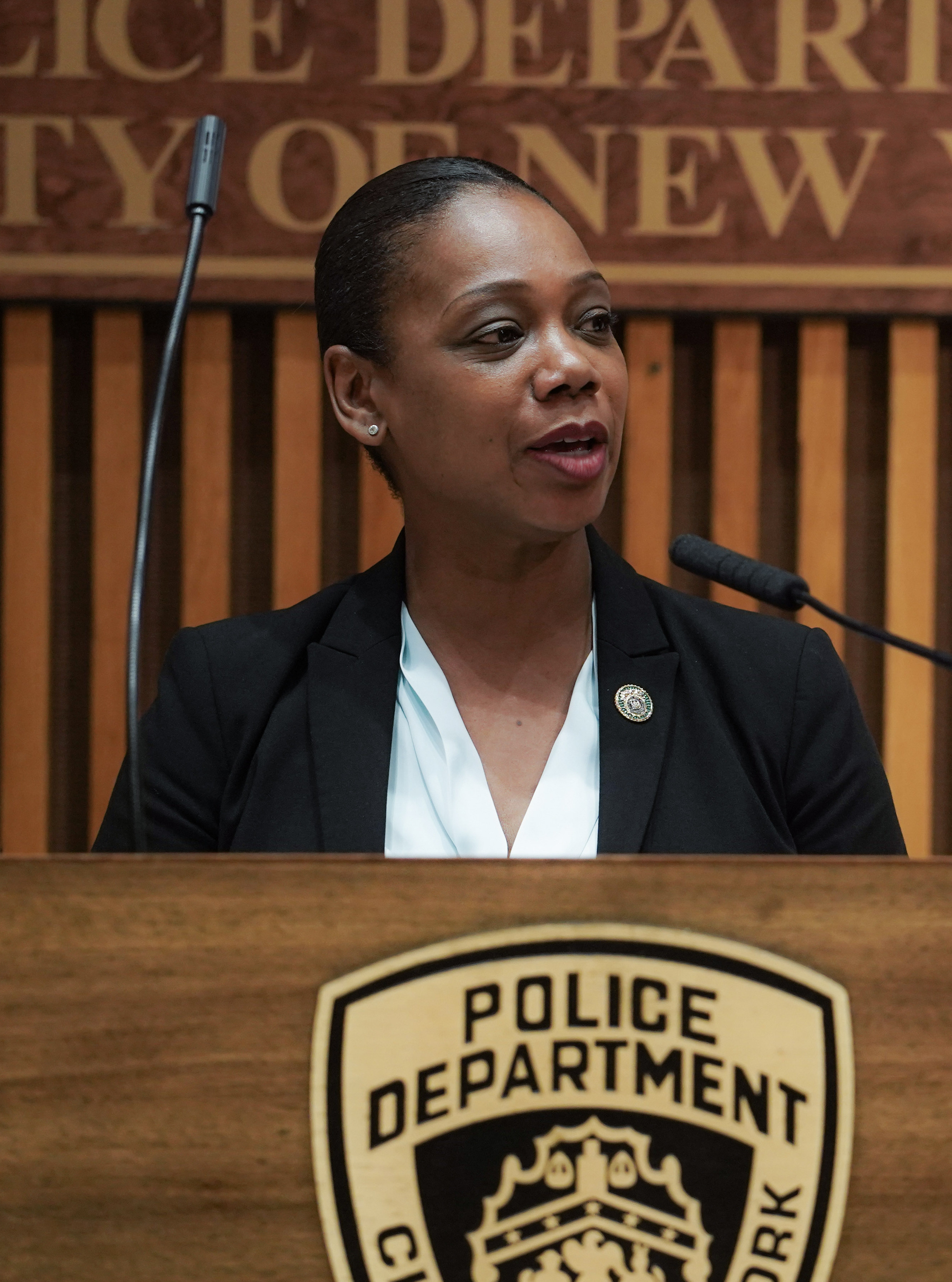
Keechant Sewell

On January 1, 2022, Keechant Sewell became the first woman to serve as the NYPD Commissioner. Juanita N. Holmes, appointed Chief of the Patrol Bureau in 2020, was the first black woman to hold this command and at the time of her appointment, was the highest-ranked uniformed woman in the NYPD. On June 12, 2023, Sewell announced that she was stepping down as commissioner. No reason was given for her departure.

On November 25, 2024, Mayor Eric Adams appointed Jessica Tisch as the NYPD commissioner. She is the second woman to serve in the job.

As of July 27, 2026 women make up 21.6% of uniformed members of service and 64.2% of civilian members. Personnel demographic self-report data allows respondents to self-identify gender, including a "non-binary" option; as of this quarterly report 15 uniformed individuals identified as such including 10 police officers, 2 detectives, 2 lieutenants, and 1 captain.

== Line of duty deaths ==
The NYPD has lost 932 officers in the line of duty since 1849. This figure includes officers from agencies that were later absorbed by or became a part of the modern NYPD, in addition to the NYPD itself. This number also includes 28 officers killed on and off duty by gunfire of other officers on duty. Gunfire from adversaries has resulted in the deaths of 286 officers. The NYPD lost 23 officers in the September 11, 2001, attacks, not including another 247 who later died of 9/11-related illnesses. The NYPD has had more line-of-duty deaths than any other American law enforcement agency.

== Services ==
The NYPD has a broad array of specialized services, including the Emergency Service Unit, K9, harbor patrol, air support, bomb squad, counter-terrorism, criminal intelligence, anti-gang, anti-organized crime, narcotics, public transportation, and public housing units. The NYPD Intelligence Division & Counter-Terrorism Bureau has officers stationed in eleven cities internationally.

In 2025, the NYPD responded to 567,668 reports of crime and made 278,953 arrests.

To evaluate its long-term performance, the NYPD has tracked criminal complaints for seven major felony offense categories encompassing homicide, rape, robbery, assault, burglary, grand larceny and auto theft. Attempted felonies in these categories are counted under these categories (e.g., an attempted burglary is recorded as a burglary), with the exception of attempted murders (counted as felony assault). There were 121,652 major felonies reported in 2025, compared to a high of 527,257 in 1990 and a low of 95,593 in 2020. Below, find the last ten years of data.

Criminal Complaints for Seven Major Felony Offenses by Year Since 2016
Crime	2016	2017	2018	2019	2020	2021	2022	2023	2024	2025
Murder & Non-Negligent Manslaughter	335	292	295	319	468	488	438	391	382	309
Rape	1,438	1,449	1,794	1,755	1,427	1,491	1,617	1,455	1,748	2,048
Robbery	15,500	13,956	12,913	13,371	13,106	13,831	17,411	16,910	16,580	15,075
Felony Assault	20,847	20,052	20,208	20,698	20,572	22,835	26,063	27,876	29,461	29,838
Burglary	12,990	12,083	11,687	10,783	15,478	12,811	15,746	13,773	13,070	12,798
Grand Larceny	44,279	43,150	43,558	43,250	35,505	40,870	51,565	50,586	48,450	48,061
Grand Larceny of Automobile	6,327	5,676	5,428	5,430	9,037	10,415	13,749	15,795	14,199	13,523
Total Seven Major Felony Offenses	101,716	96,658	95,883	95,606	95,593	102,741	126,589	126,786	123,890	121,652

The NYPD's data do not correspond to the Uniform Crime Report (UCR) format of the Federal Bureau of Investigation and are thus not directly comparable to other jurisdictions.

== Public opinion ==
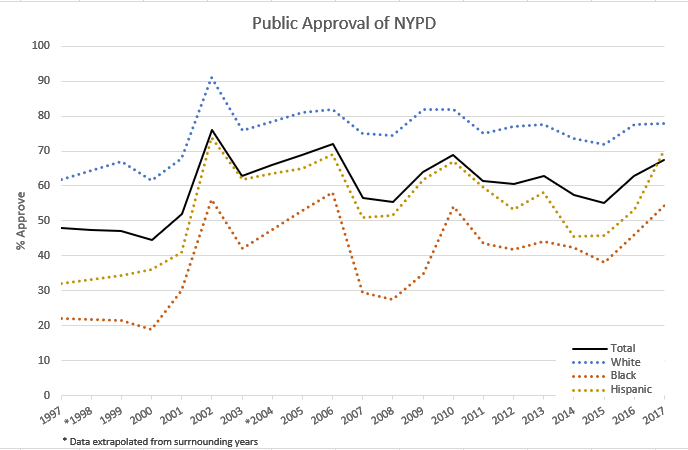
Public approval of the NYPD over time

The Quinnipiac University Polling Institute has been regularly measuring public opinion of the NYPD since 1997 when just under 50% of the public approved of the job the NYPD was doing. Approval peaked at 78% in 2002 following the World Trade Center terrorist attacks in September 2001, and has ranged between 52 and 72% since. Approval varies by race/ethnicity, with black and Hispanic respondents consistently less likely to say they approve of the job the NYPD is doing than whites.

In 2017, the Quinnipiac poll found that New York City voters approve of the way NYPD, in general, does its job by a margin of 67–25%. Approval was 79–15 percent among white voters, 52–37 percent among black voters, and 73–24 percent among Hispanic voters. 86% of voters said crime is a serious problem, 71% said police brutality is a serious problem and 61% said police corruption is a serious problem.

A 2020 poll commissioned by Manhattan Institute for Policy Research reported that the public approved of the NYPD 53% to 40% against, again with strong racial differences: 59% of whites and Asians approved, as did 51% of Hispanics, whereas 51% of black residents disapproved.

== Brutality, corruption, and misconduct cases ==
The NYPD's history has included police brutality, corruption, misconduct, and discrimination, which critics argue persist into the present. Critics, including from within the NYPD, have accused the NYPD of manipulating crime statistics. In 2009, NYPD officer Adrian Schoolcraft was arrested, abducted by his fellow officers and involuntarily admitted to a psychiatric hospital after he provided evidence of manipulation of crime statistics (intentional under reporting of crimes) and intentional wrongful arrests (to meet arrest quotas). He filed a federal suit against the department, which the city settled before trial in 2015, also giving him back pay for the period when he was suspended.

The Knapp Commission found in 1970 that the NYPD had systematic corruption problems. The Civilian Complaint Review Board is a civilian-led 13-member panel tasked with investigating misconduct or lesser abuse accusations against NYPD officers, including abuse of authority, discourtesy, excessive use-of-force, and offensive language. Complaints against officers may be filed online, by mail, by phone, or in person at any NYPD station. On June 8, 2020, both houses of the New York state assembly passed the Eric Garner Anti-Chokehold Act, which provides that any police officer in the state of New York who injures or kills somebody through the use of "a chokehold or similar restraint" can be charged with a class C felony, punishable by up to 15 years in prison. New York governor Andrew Cuomo signed the police reforms into law on June 12, 2020, which he described as "long overdue".

In 2020, during the early part of the COVID-19 pandemic, many NYPD officers refused to wear face masks while policing protests related to racial injustice, contrary to the recommendations of health experts and authorities. During the George Floyd protests, The New York Times reported that more than 60 videos showed NYPD police attacking protesters, many of whom were attacked without cause. Included in these attacks were the 'kettling' of protesters, an officer removing the mask of a protester and pepper spraying him, and an incident where police vehicles were driven into a crowd. An investigation by New York City's Department of Investigation concluded that the NYPD had exercised excessive force during the George Floyd protests.

In 2024, the NYPD tossed out more than 400 civilian complaints about police misconduct without reviewing the evidence. All of the cases had been investigated by the Civilian Complaint Review Board. In March, NYPD commissioner Edward Caban said that the force had exceeded its overtime budget by $100 million, spending $2.5 million a week on overtime alone amid political demonstrations throughout the city and increased deployments in the subway system. Police overtime spending went from $4 million in 2022 to $155 million in 2023. In September, the NYPD was also accused of extorting a Brooklyn bar owner. The owner said that associate director Ray Martin of the mayor's Office of Entertainment and Nightlife told him that he could pay Commissioner Caban's brother for better treatment from police. Caban resigned his commission shortly after, following a federal investigation into the NYPD's nightclub enforcement. Three days before resigning, Caban watered down the NYPD's misconduct rules, reducing penalties for officers "guilty of abusing authority, using offensive language, failing to take a civilian complaint, and conducting an unlawful search." The NYPD has been persistently criticized by safe streets community advocates for endangering cyclists by parking their vehicles in bike lanes, and for misapplying the law when ticketing cyclists riding outside blocked bike lanes. According to a 2021 FiveThirtyEight analysis, New York City spent at least an average of US$170 million annually in settlements related to police misconduct over ten years.

Between 2023 and 2024, Lieutenant Thomas Fabrizi stole $64,000 in overtime compensation for shifts he spent at home and working for McCann Protective Services, a security contractor. In December 2024, the Chief of Internal Affairs, Miguel Iglesias, was forced out amid criticism of his handling of sexual abuse allegations against former Chief Jeffrey Maddrey, prompting a leadership shake-up and a department-wide personnel review.

== Technology ==
In the 1990s, the NYPD developed a CompStat system of management which has also since been established in other cities. The NYPD has extensive crime scene investigation and laboratory resources, as well as units that assist with computer crime investigations. In 2005, the NYPD established a "Real Time Crime Center" to assist in investigations; This is essentially a searchable database that pulls information from departmental records, including traffic tickets, court summonses, and previous complaints to reports, as well as arrest reports. The database contains files to identify individuals based on tattoos, body marks, teeth, and skin conditions, based on police records.

The NYPD also maintains the Domain Awareness System, a network that provides information and analytics to police, drawn from a variety of sources, including a network of 9,000 publicly and privately owned license plate readers, surveillance cameras, shotspotter data, NYPD databases, radiation, and chemical sensors. The Domain Awareness System of surveillance was developed as part of Lower Manhattan Security Initiative in a partnership between the NYPD and Microsoft. It allows the NYPD to track surveillance targets and gain detailed information about them. It also has access to data from at least 2 billion license plate readings, 100 million summonses, 54 million 911 calls, 15 million complaints, 12 million detective reports, 11 million arrests, and 2 million warrants. The 9,000 CCTV cameras consist of data text records that will be kept for 30 days. The system is connected to 9,000 video cameras across New York City.

In 2020, the NYPD deployed a robotic dog, known as Digidog, manufactured by Boston Dynamics. The robotic dog has cameras which send back real-time footage along with lights and two-way communication, and it is able to navigate on its own using artificial intelligence. Reaction by locals to Digidog was mixed. Deployment of Digidog led to condemnation from the Surveillance Technology Oversight Project and the American Civil Liberties Union due to privacy concerns. In response to its deployment, a city council member has proposed a law banning armed robots; this would not apply to Digidog as Digidog is not armed and Boston Dynamics prohibits arming its robots. On April 24, 2021, U.S. Representative Ritchie Torres proposed new federal legislation requiring police departments receiving federal funds to report use of surveillance technology to the Department of Homeland Security and Congress. The NYPD states that the robot is meant for hostage, terrorism, bomb threat, and hazardous material situations, and that it was properly disclosed to the public under current law. Following continued pushback against Digidog, including opposition to the system's $94,000 price tag, the NYPD announced on April 28, 2021, that its lease would be terminated. In April 2023, Mayor Eric Adams announced the revival of the Digidog program in a reversal of his predecessor Bill de Blasio, saying "Digidog is out of the pound." Two robots were purchased at that time for a total of $750,000 using funds from asset forfeiture.

== Surveillance practices ==
The NYPD has deployed a wide range of surveillance technologies and strategies, many of which have drawn criticism from civil liberties organizations, residents and public health experts. Scholars have traced the roots of radicalized surveillance in New York City back to the 18th century, when colonial "lantern laws" required Black, mixed-race, and Indigenous enslaved people to carry candle lanterns if they walked through the city after sunset without a white companion Any white person was authorized to stop those who did not comply. Simon Brown, a professor of African and African Diaspora Studies at the University of Texas at Austin, has argued that these latter laws established a legal framework for surveillance practices that continued into the modern era, including the NYPD's policing of public housing.

=== Omnipresence program ===
In 2014, the NYPD launched a strategy called "Omnipresence," which deployed officers as stationary sentries and installed high-intensity floodlights powered by diesel generators across public housing developments in neighborhoods such as Brownsville, Brooklyn. Residents describe the lights shining into their apartments and the constant noise from the generators. One resident told "VICE" that "the lights shine into people's rooms making it hard for them to sleep." The program received almost no public documentation at its launch, and the NYPD initially declined to explain what Omnipresence was when asked by journalists". Brett Stoudt, a psychologist at the John Jay College of Criminal Justice, noted the psychological toll of aggressive policing on low-income communities of color and described the lack of clarity around the program as "confounding".

The program was later formalized under Mayor Bill De Blasio's Mayor Action Plan for Neighborhood Safety (MAP), a $140 million initiative targeting 15 NYCHA (New York City Housing Authority) developments that counted for 20 percent of all violent crime in public housing in 2014. MAP included the installation of over 13,000 CCTV cameras, layered access control doors, and permanent LED lighting at NYCHA sires across the city. The city reported an 11.2 percent drop in violent crime at MAP developments between fiscal years 2014 and 2015, with shootings down 14. 7 percent.

Each temporary floodlight tower deployed under the program approximately 600,000 lumens, roughly four times brighter than the brightest lights at Yankee Stadium. A study by the National Bureau of Economic Research found that the floodlights led to a 36 percent reduction in nighttime outdoor index crimes, including assault, robbery, and motor vehicle theft, over a six-month period. An updated study drawing on three years of data from 80 sites estimated a 45 percent reduction in nighttime index crime. However, the program has faced significant criticism. The American Medical Association issued guidelines warning against the health affect of high-intensity LED lighting in residential areas, noting associations with reduced sleep, impaired functioning, and obesity. The executive director of the International Dark-Sky Association described the program as "weaponizing light," and the president of the National Institute of Crime Prevention stated that such lighting "would not happen in an affluent neighborhood." One resident compared the floodlit courtyard to a "concentration camp." The New Yorker noted that the city never tested gentler lighting alternatives in a single public housing development, despite using warmer, lower-intensity street lighting in wealthier neighborhoods. Filmmaker Nadia Hallgren, who documented the program in her short film "Omnipresence", observed that in wealthy communities, complaints about lighting "get taken of the next day," while in NYCHA developments, "the lights beam into children's bedrooms, and the noise from the generator is really loud, and people cant sleep–and no one cares." Researchers have connected the Omnipresence program to the city's longer history of racialized surveillance. Josh Scannell, a graduate student at the City University of New York, drew a direct link between the 18th century lantern laws and the NYPD's use of high-intensity artificial lights in public housing, describing both as forms of "violent illumination" imposed on Black communities in the same city space.

=== Facial recognition and surveillance infrastructure ===
A 2019 report by the Brennan Center for Justice catalogued 15 categories of surveillance technology acquired by the NYPD, many without public disclosure or the New York City Council's oversight. These include facial recognition systems, video analytics developed in partnership with IBM that could search surveillance footage by perceived skin tone, cell site simulators which have been used in over 1,000 investigations, automatic license plate readers with access to a database of over 2.2 billion reads, a DNA database containing over 82,000 genetic profiles, predictive policing algorithms, social media monitoring tools, x-ray vans, drone, and SkyWatch surveillance towers. The report found that many of these technologies lacked standalone public policies governing their use and that they disproportionately impacted communities of color.

A 2021 investigation by Amnesty International revealed that the NYPD could track individuals across the city by running images from over 15,000 surveillance cameras through facial recognition software, and that the department had used facial recognition in approximately 22,000 cases since 2017. The Brennan Center report noted that the NYPD's Facial Identification Section runs static photos against databases that include arrest photos of children as young as 11, and when that footage is blurry, investigators have used photo editing tools and even celebrity photos to generate potential matches.

The NYPD has also expanded its surveillance capabilities through partnerships with private technology companies. In November 2022, "The Verge" reported on the NYPD's partnership with the Neighbors platform, an Amazon-operated surveillance network that allows police to view posts and use footage from residents home security cameras for criminal investigations.

=== Fusus camera integration program ===
In June 2023, the NYPD partnered with Fusus, a camera integration platform owned by Axon, to launch a proof-of-concept program in the 109th Precinct in Flushing, Queens. The platform allows private businesses to voluntarily share their security camera feeds with local NYPD precincts in real time. During the first 60 days, the NYPD used intelligence gathered through the program to close a citywide burglary pattern involving 15 incidents.

Following the proof-of-concept, the NYPD established a one-year, $1.5 million contract with Fusus to expand the program to nine additional precincts across all five boroughs. The city also indicated that it was exploring the possibility of expanding the platform to include residential cameras. Axon has described Fusus as a "one-stop shop" for real-time crime centers, highlighting its ability to integrate camera feeds, automated license plate readers, and community-contributed footage into a single platform accessible from both command centers and mobile devices.

Civil liberties organizations have raised concerns about the growth of public-private surveillance partnerships. The Brennan Center report noted that the extent to which the NYPD shares surveillance data with federal agencies, including Immigration and Customs Enforcement (ICE), remains unknown. Activists and privacy advocates have described the expansion of surveillance technology in New York City as part of a broader pattern in over-surveillance and under-protection in low-income communities of color.

== Vehicles ==
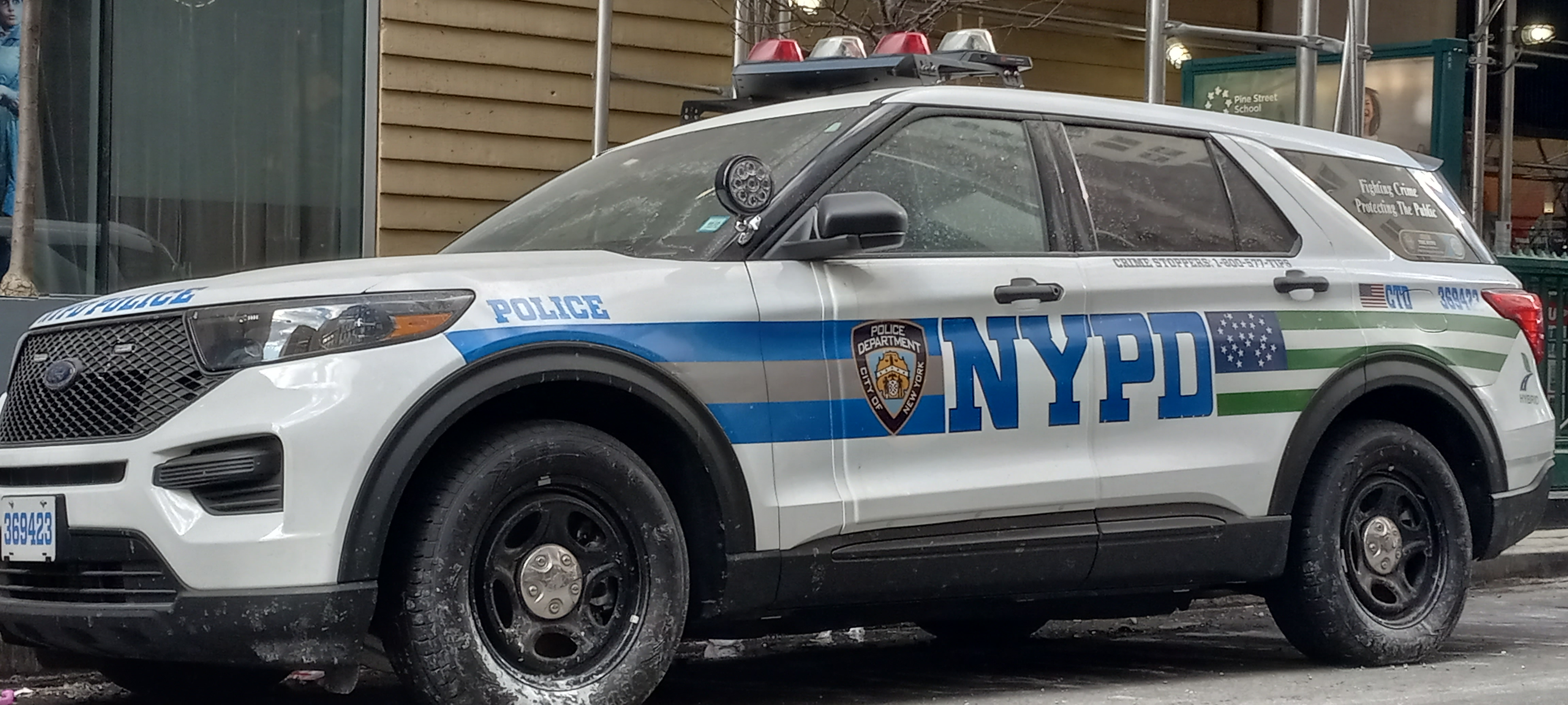
NYPD new redesigned patrol vehicles

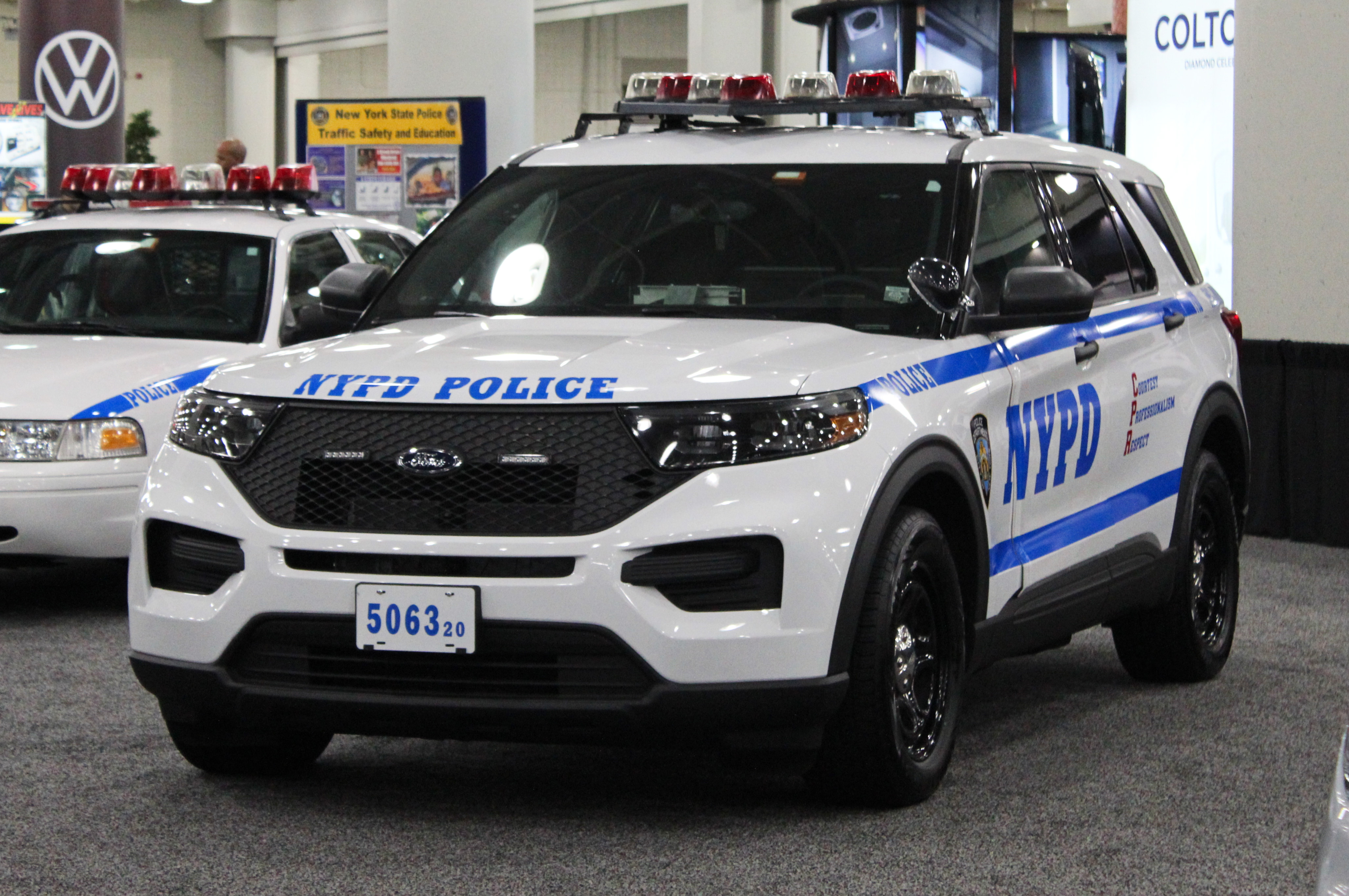
NYPD Ford Police Interceptor Utility

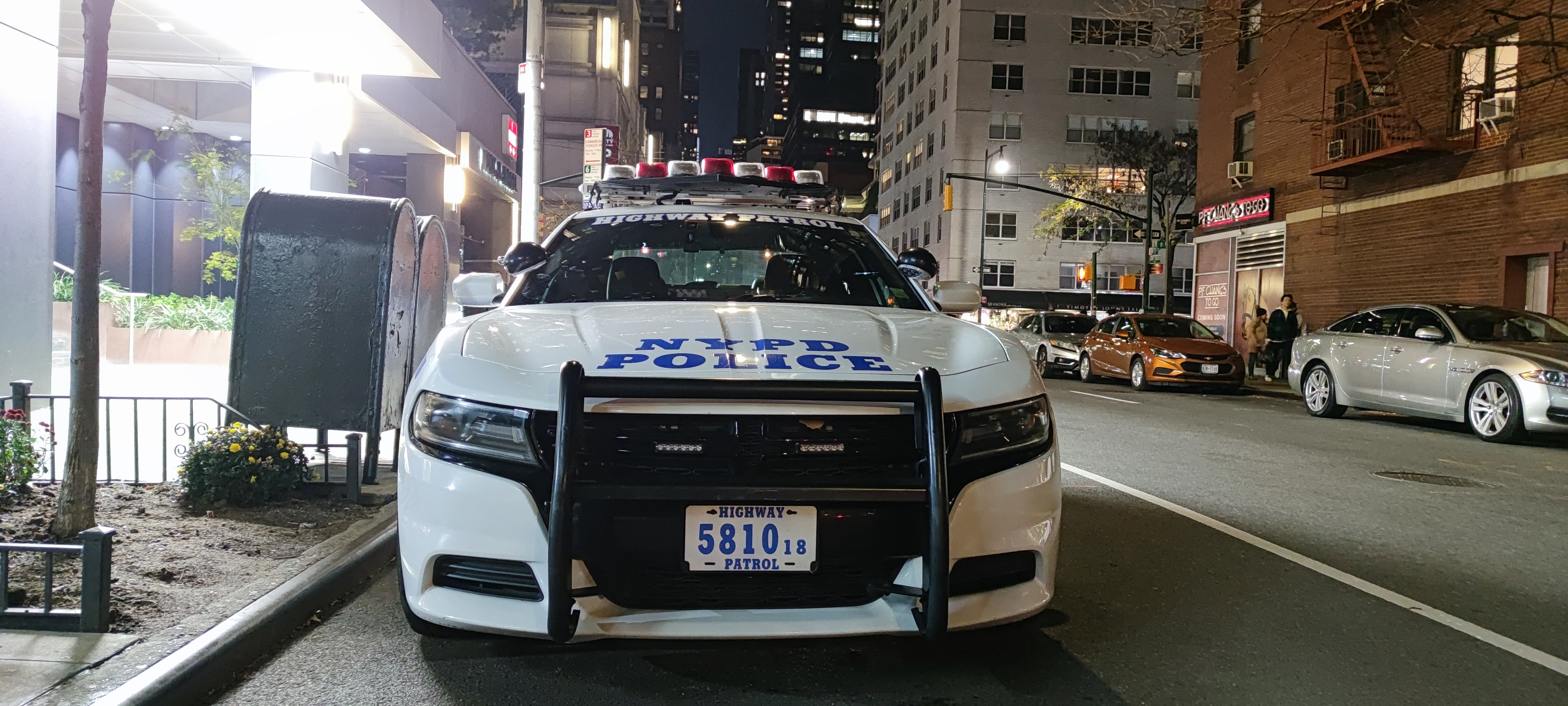
NYPD Dodge Charger

== Firearms ==
New NYPD officers are allowed to choose from one of two 9mm service pistols: the Glock 17 Gen4 and Glock 19 Gen4. All duty handguns were previously modified to a 12-pound (53 N) NY-2 trigger pull, though recruits were being issued handguns with a factory standard trigger pull as of 2021. Approved off-duty firearms are Springfield XD-S, Glock 26, and Sig Sauer P365. Smith & wesson M&P shield.

The Smith & Wesson 5946 and Sig Sauer P226 semi-automatic 9mm pistol with double action only (DAO) trigger, were issued to recruits in the past; however, those models are no longer issued, with the Smith & Wesson model being discontinued. While it is no longer an option for new hires, officers who were issued the weapons may continue to use them. Shotgun-certified officers were authorized to carry Ithaca 37 shotguns, which are being phased out in favor of the newer Mossberg 590. Officers and detectives belonging to the NYPD's Emergency Service Unit, Counter-terrorism Bureau and Strategic Response Group are armed with a range of select-fire weapons and long guns, such as the Colt M4A1 carbine and similar-pattern Colt AR-15 rifles, Heckler & Koch MP5 submachine gun, and the Remington Model 700 bolt-action rifle. NYPD ESU Officers also use the Ruger AC-556, chambered in 556.45 MM.

=== Discontinued handguns ===
From 1926 until 1986, the standard sidearms of the department were the Smith & Wesson Model 10 and the Colt Official Police .38 Special revolvers with four-inch barrels. Female officers had the option to choose to carry a three-inch barrel revolver instead of the normal four-inch model due to its lighter weight. Before 1994, the standard sidearm of the NYPD was the Smith & Wesson Model 64 DAO, a .38 Special revolver with a three- or four-inch barrel, and the Ruger Police Service-Six with a four-inch barrel. This type of revolver was called the Model NY-1 by the department. After the switch in 1994 to semi-automatic pistols, officers who privately purchased revolvers before January 1, 1994, were allowed to use them for duty use until August 31, 2018. They were grandfathered in as approved off-duty guns. Before the issuing of the 9mm semi-automatic pistol, NYPD detectives and plainclothes officers often carried the Colt Detective Special and/or the Smith & Wesson Model 36 "Chief's Special" .38 Special caliber snub-nosed (two-inch) barrel revolvers for their ease of concealment while dressed in civilian clothes. The Kahr K9 9mm pistol was an approved off-duty/backup weapon from 1998 to 2011. It was pulled from service because it could not be modified to a 12-pound trigger pull.

== Affiliations ==
The NYPD is affiliated with the New York City Police Foundation and the New York City Police Museum. It also runs a Youth Police academy to provide a positive interaction with police officers and to educate young people about the challenges and responsibilities of police work. The NYPD additionally sponsors a Law Enforcement Explorer Program through Scouting America (formerly the Boy Scouts of America). The department also operates the Citizens Police Academy, which educates the public on basic law and policing procedures.

== See also ==
- Detectives' Endowment Association
- Law enforcement in New York City
- New York City Office of Administrative Trials and Hearings
- Police Benevolent Association of the City of New York
- Police surveillance in New York City
- Sergeants Benevolent Association
