= New York City Police Department Mounted Unit =

Police on horseback in New York, US

Mounted Unit
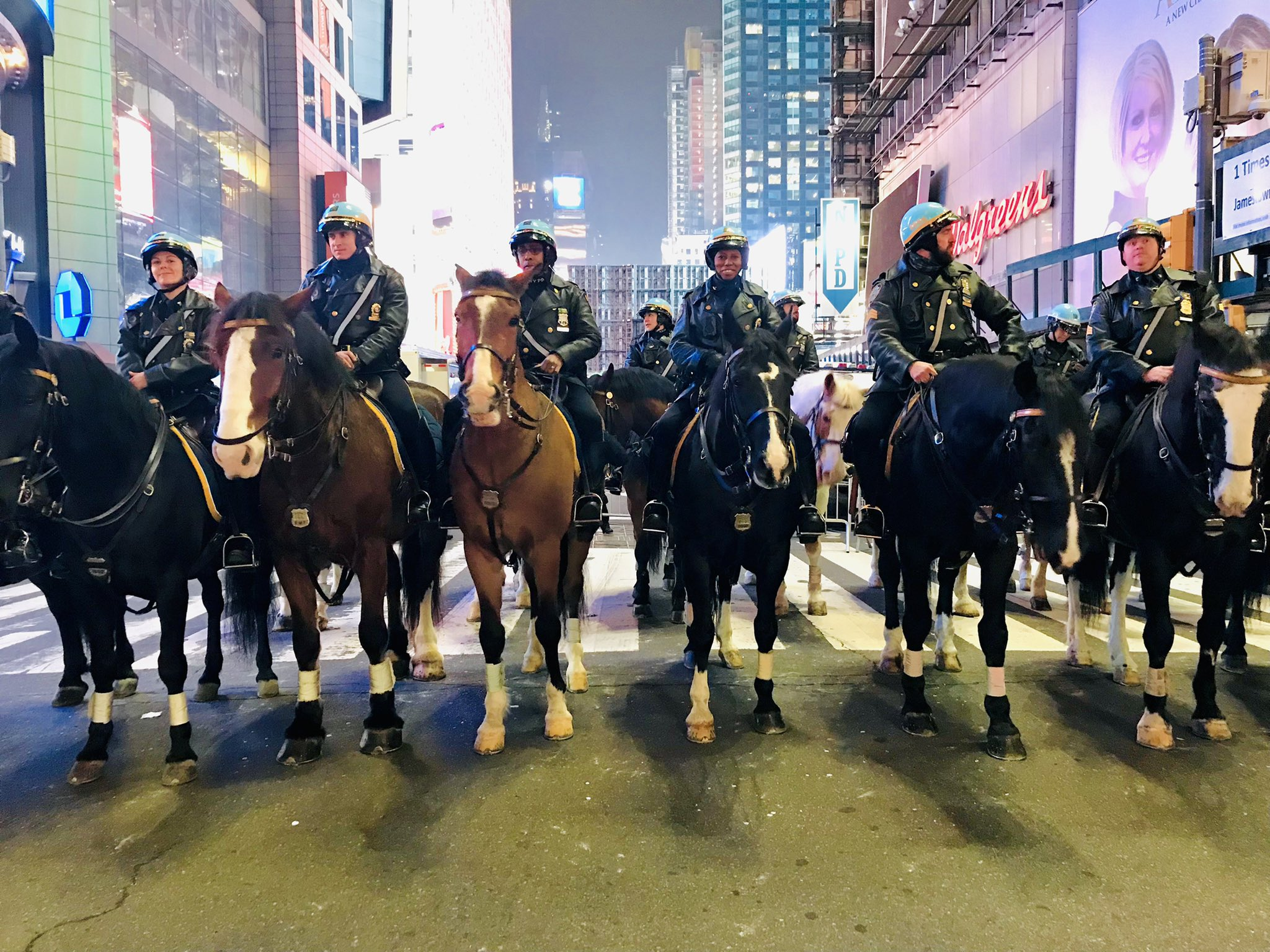
- NYPD Mounted Unit in Times Square 2022
- Active: 1858–present
- Country: United States
- Agency: New York City Police Department
- Part of: Special Operations Bureau
- Headquarters: 553 W 53rd St, New York, NY 10019

Structure
- Troops: Troop B (Manhattan); Troop D (Bronx); Troop E (Brooklyn); Troop F (Queens)

Commanders
- Current commander: Inspector Barry M. Gelbman

Equipment
- Vehicles: Horse trailers, Ford F-250s, and other various support vehicles
- Animals: 35 Horses

Website
- www1.nyc.gov/site/nypd/bureaus/patrol/citywide-operations.page

The Mounted Unit is part of the Special Operations Bureau of the New York City Police Department (NYPD) and is one of the largest mounted police units in the United States. The Mounted Unit, referred to as "10 foot cops", is used as a crime deterrent and often deployed for crowd control at demonstrations, protests, concerts, sporting events, and parades throughout four of New York's five boroughs. Staten Island does not have a mounted unit troop.

== History ==
The Mounted Unit was founded in 1858 to regulate and enforce traffic laws on horse riders and carriages on the streets of the city.

Staten Island once had mounted police at least prior to consolidating into New York City.

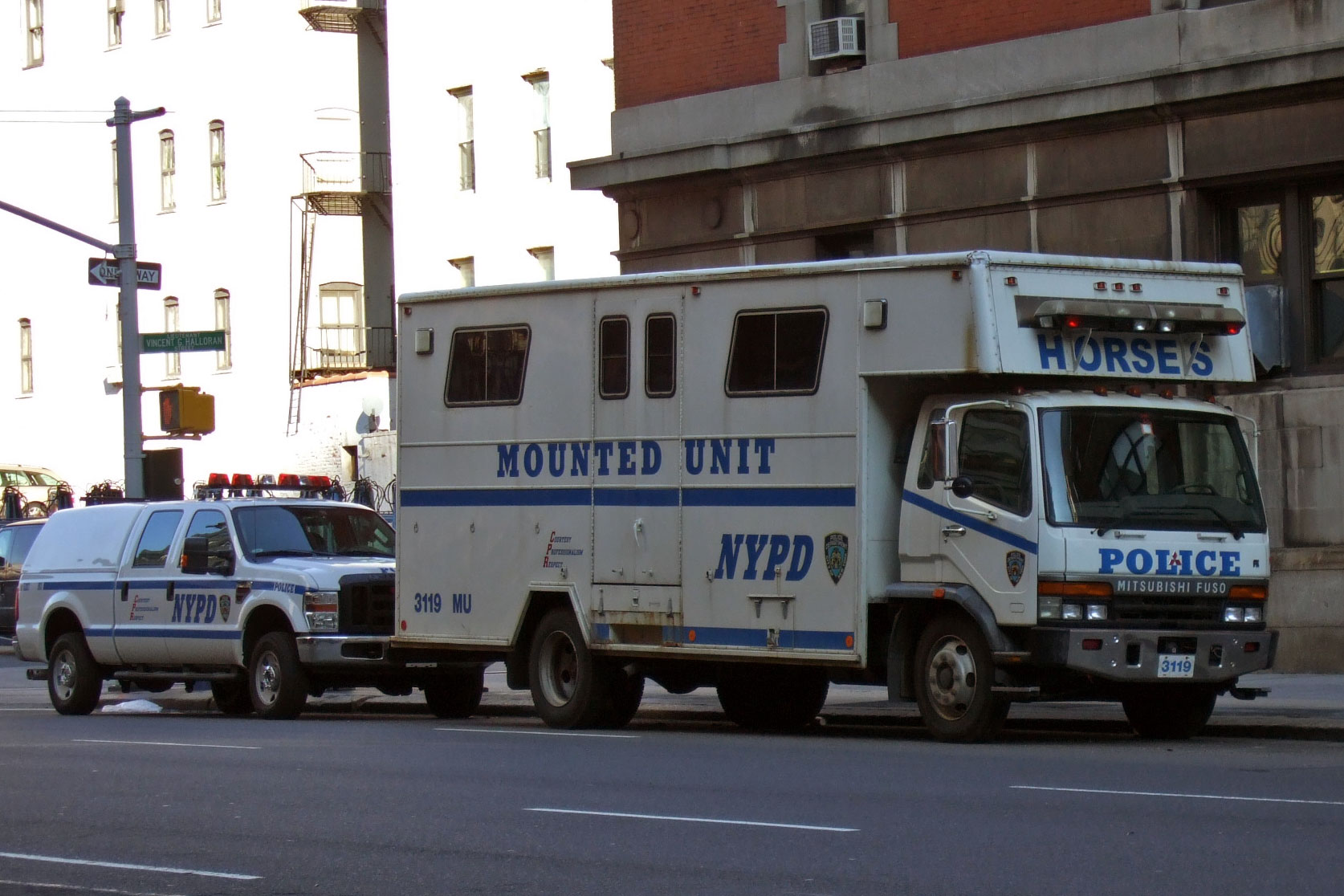
Mounted Unit support vehicles

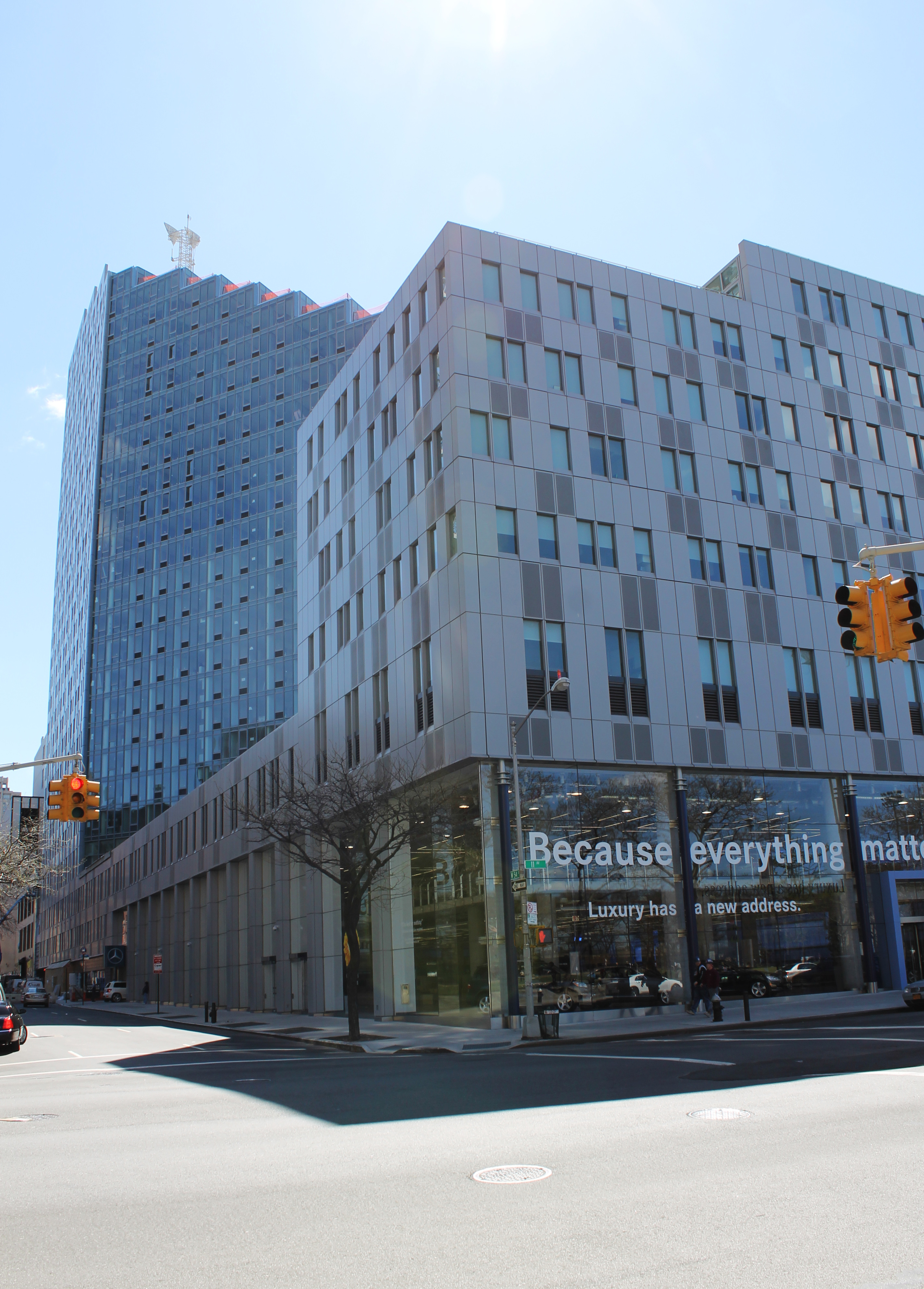
Mercedes House where the Mounted Unit HQ and Troop B are now located

In 2015 the unit moved its headquarters and Troop B stables from Pier 76 in Hell's Kitchen to a new state-of-the-art stables located on the ground floor of the Mercedes House luxury apartment building and the adjacent Mercedes Manhattan dealership in the north part of the same neighborhood.

== Horse selection and training ==
Mostly raised in Pennsylvania, the horses don't begin training for the NYPD until they're fully grown. Members of the Mounted Unit will pick out around five to six horses at a time, bring them back to the unit's training facility in Pelham Bay Park in the Bronx and put them through a week or two of training.

== Uniform and equipment ==
The Mounted Unit wears different uniforms than normal patrol officers.

Similar to the Highway Patrol, mounted unit officers normally wear blue NYPD helmets, Motor Vehicle Operator (MVO) breeches with a gold stripe, black leather jackets (in winter), and black riding boots.

Mounted patrol officers are equipped with standard-issue Glock sidearms and a long wooden baton, although this equipment may change depending on conditions and mission.

== See also ==
- Mounted police
- New York City Police Department
