= New York City Police Department Aviation Unit =

Aerial police force in the United States

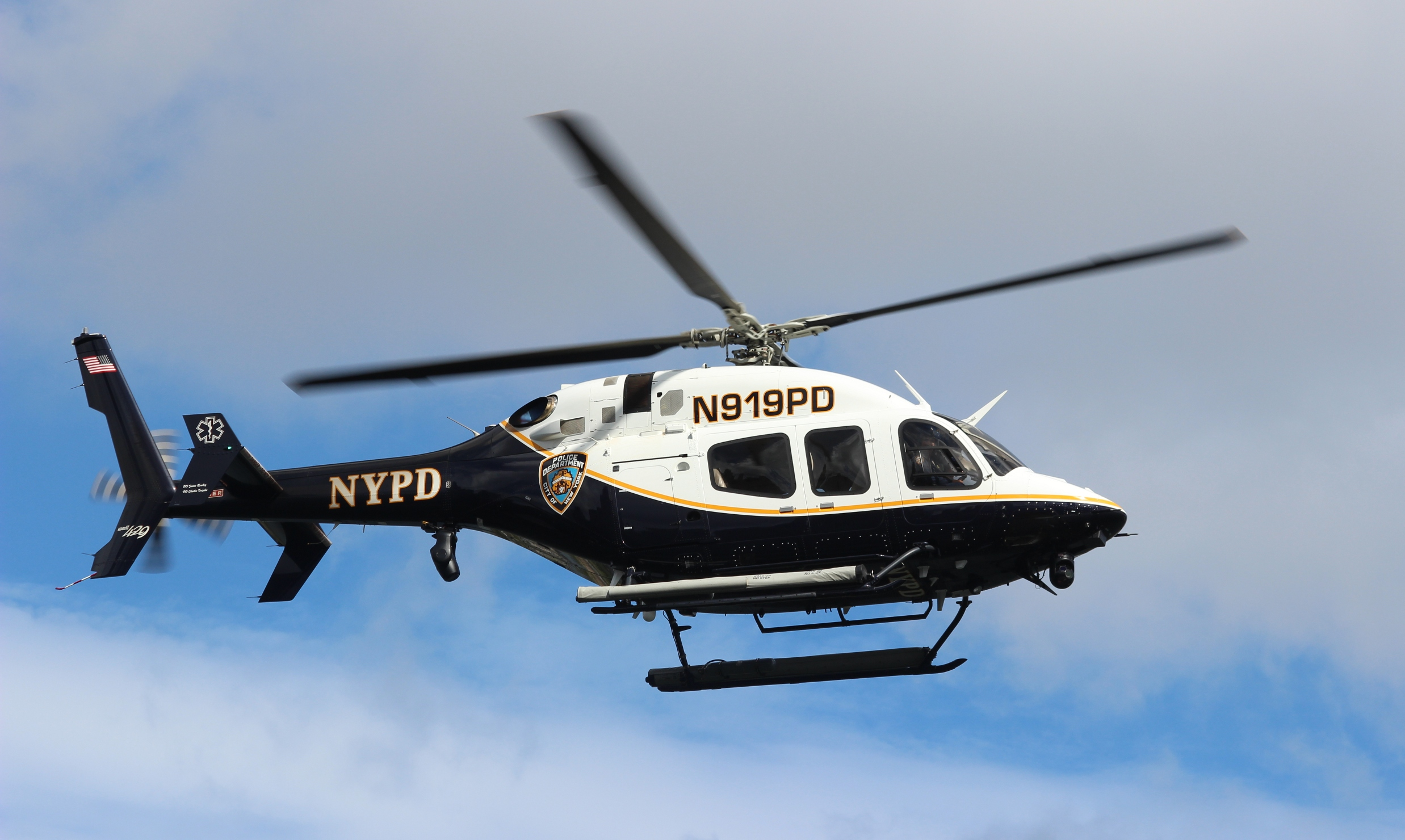
- NYPD air unit, radio callsign "Finest"

Agency overview
- Formed: December 1918; 107 years ago
- Type: Law Enforcement
- Jurisdiction: New York City
- Headquarters: Floyd Bennett Field, Brooklyn
- Employees: 67 (2024)
- Agency executive: Wilson Aramboles, Assistant Chief
- Parent department: NYPD Special Operations Bureau
- Parent agency: New York City Police Department
NYPD Air Operations Heliport
- IATA: none; ICAO: none; FAA LID: NY22
Summary
- Airport type: Private
- Owner/Operator: City of New York
- Elevation AMSL: 6 ft (1.8 m)
- Coordinates: 40°35′25″N 73°52′54″W
Map
- Interactive map of NYPD Air Operations Heliport
Helipads
Number	Length		Surface
Number	ft	m	Surface
H1	70	21	Concrete
- Data via FAA Airport Data and Information Portal as of November 2021

The New York City Police Department Aviation Unit is a division of the New York City Police Department (NYPD) focused on airborne law enforcement and public safety. Operating under command of the NYPD Special Operations Bureau, the unit frequently works alongside partner agencies like the NYPD Harbor Unit and United States Coast Guard (USCG) to service New York City and its surrounding waters. The unit is headquartered at Floyd Bennett Field in Brooklyn, and boasts emergency response times within 8–10 minutes to most parts of the city.

In March 2021, Airbus Helicopters responded to a request for proposal (RFP) from the unit to replace its Bell 412EP search and rescue helicopters with two new H175 models.

== History ==
=== Background ===
Initial development of police aviation as a tool was rooted in national security concerns stemming from the United States' entry into World War I. Early 20th century fears of foreign sabotage in the US were compounded by domestic political violence related to Anarchist and Labor movements, plus the 1916 federalization and mobilization of the National Guard had left many states (and their municipalities) feeling unprepared to handle internal emergencies without organized security forces of their own.

In New York City, this perceived vulnerability was addressed by the 1916 formation of the Home Defense League under Police Commissioner Arthur H. Woods. That unit was reorganized in 1918 as the Reserve Police Force under Special Deputy Commissioner Rodman Wanamaker, and split into both a reserve component and a training corps. While the Reserve was a general-purpose body, SDC Wanamaker—an early aviation investor and friend of Glenn Curtiss—envisioned a volunteer aviation squadron within its ranks. External events, like the Black Tom explosion and specifically the Morgan Munitions Depot explosion, reinforced the need for such a capability. In the latter, private pilots at nearby Roosevelt Field were asked by New York City officials to survey the disaster in real-time. Their efforts provided valuable reconnaissance for firefighters on the ground and cemented the NYPD leadership's resolve to launch a professional air wing of its own.

One month later, the Armistice of November 1918 ended the war and brought home thousands of American service members—many of them newly trained airmen who would soon participate in the booming US aviation industry. While the end of hostilities alleviated some national security concerns, Police leadership still realized that peacetime regulation would be needed as airplanes became mainstream technology. As Colonel Jefferson De Mont Thompson—soon to become New York's first chief of aerial police—put it, "If traffic rules and regulations are necessary to keep order where streets and courses are plainly marked, it is doubly important that there be those aloft invested with authority to preserve safety." In addition to regulatory enforcement, he laid out several potential missions for the fledgling unit including maritime search and rescue, riot control, and firefighting direction.

=== Formation ===
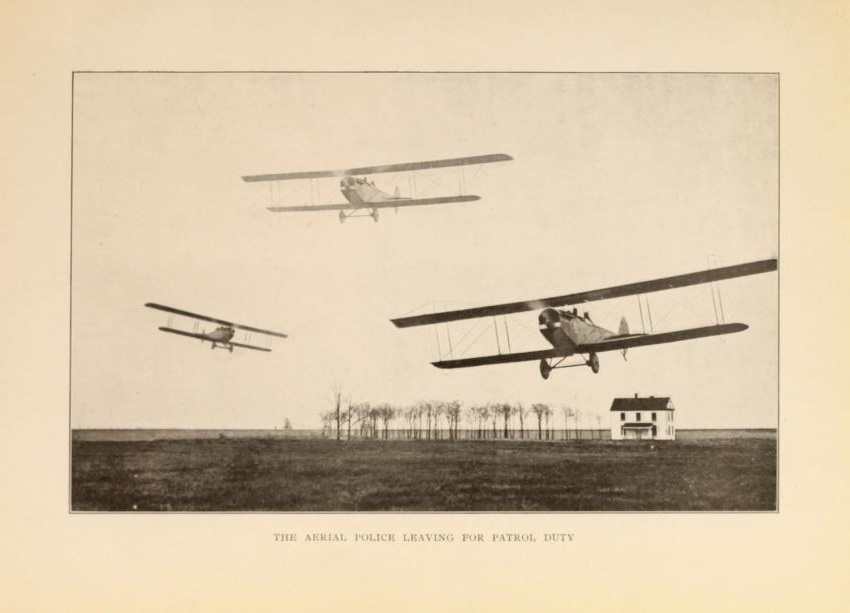
Curtiss JN-series biplanes of the NYPD Reserve departing for a patrol mission (circa 1919)

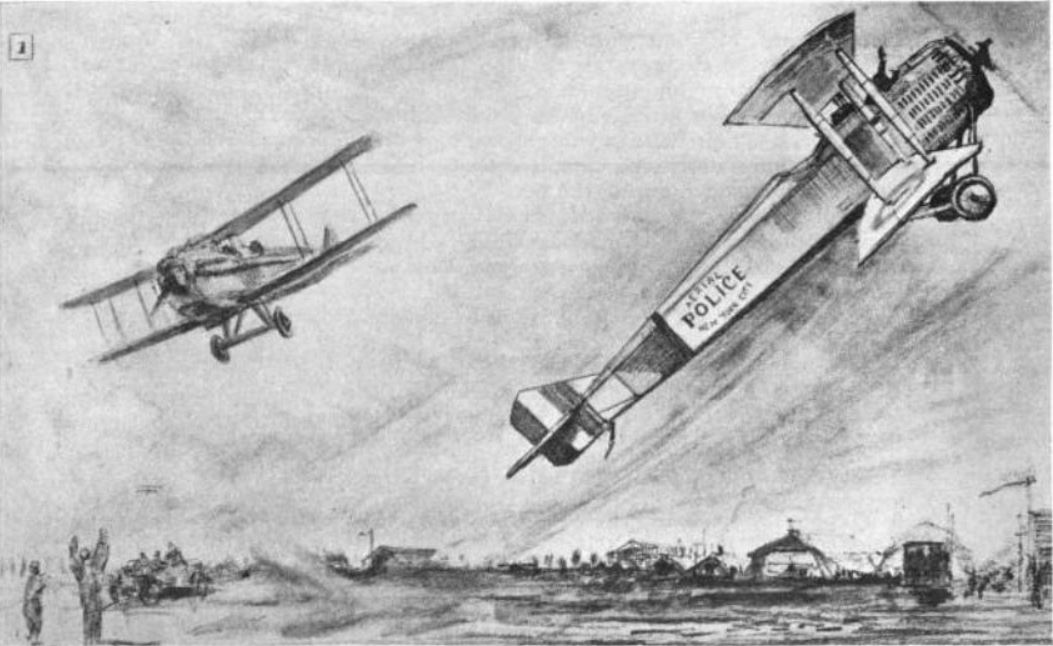
Drawing of NYPD Salmson biplane piloted by Granville A. Pollock, originally published in The Illustrated London News, February 28, 1920.

In December 1918 The New York Times announced the world's first Aerial Police Reserve, citing consultant and aviation journalist Henry Woodhouse:

A police department is very much in the position of a legislative body. If it is led by progressive men, it looks ahead into the future and adopts progressive measures to meet the conditions. If it is not progressive it waits until the need for measures is emphasized by harmful effects and then it tries to patch up the harm done. Considering the step taken by the New York City Police Department there is no gainsaying the fact that it belongs in the first category.

— Henry Woodhouse

On March 28, 1919, an initial cadre of 26 aerial police officers were sworn in from a pool of over 125 applicants. Colonel Jefferson De Mont Thompson was appointed Chief, and Granville A. Pollock its commanding officer. The unit's first official flight took place on April 30, 1919, from Sheepshead Bay Race Track destined for Philadelphia, PA.

Early visions of the unit's mission and tactics invoked a highly militarized tone; its first airplanes were armed with machine guns and tracer ammunition. Newspapers also imagined dogfights against "sky pirates" or the hunting-down of "river pirates" in the city's waterways, and even published headlines like "Armed With Machine Guns, They Open the Season's Campaign on Air Traffic Violators."

By May 1919, the reserve numbered 150 airmen and 7 Department-owned airplanes, each equipped with wireless telephones and telegraphs. In October of that year, the department announced recruitment for a new women's aviation corps. Laura Bromwell was the first graduate of this program, becoming the world's first aerial policewoman at 21 years of age.

The NYPD Annual Report for 1920 counted the unit's assets as two seaplanes, two landplanes, and three "flying stations" located on the Hudson River, at Fort Hamilton, and a site which eventually became Leif Ericson Park in Brooklyn.

=== Re-establishment ===
On July 12, 1939, Mayor Fiorello La Guardia re-established the Aviation Unit at Floyd Bennett Field under the command of Arthur W. Wallander. Coinciding with both the 1939 World's Fair and the reopening of LaGuardia Airport that summer, the department recruited a staff of 6 pilots and 6 mechanics to operate its two new Stinson Reliants. Early missions of the newly reformed unit included aerial photography, highway traffic reporting, and regulatory enforcement.

=== Unit Citation Award ===
The Aviation Unit was awarded a 2023 Unit Citation. The Unit Citation is awarded to a specific unit or precinct for outstanding accomplishments.

=== Rise in spending ===
Spending on helicopter usage spiked dramatically under Mayor Eric Adams.

== Capabilities ==
=== Law enforcement ===
Most of the unit's annual flight hours are accumulated through daily patrol duties, which often include general surveillance or support of NYPD street officers conducting manhunts and suspect pursuits. These missions are typically crewed by one Pilot-in-command and one Tactical Flight Officer (TFO) employing imaging and detection equipment like Wescam infrared cameras and Spectrolab searchlights. The unit's helicopters are also equipped with Global Positioning System (GPS) technology providing real-time street grid and position data overlaid on multi-function displays (MFDs). Live video can be streamed to ground units and headquarters via a microwave data link.

=== Search and rescue ===
With the 1998 closure of CGAS Brooklyn and consolidation of Coast Guard air assets at CGAS Atlantic City, NYPD Aviation became the sole maritime search and rescue provider in the NYC metropolitan area. Tasked with responding to emergencies within 60 miles of the city, the unit's SAR helicopters are certified for instrument flight rules (IFR) and equipped with hoists, auto-hover functionality, and capacity for six rescue litters. As of 2013, NYPD Aviation was also the only law enforcement agency in the US to maintain 24/7 SCUBA diving capability.

=== Counter-terrorism ===
In the wake of the September 11, 2001 attacks, the unit's focus increasingly shifted toward its counterterrorism mission. In 2003 it took delivery of a $9.8 million (equivalent to $17,151,773 in 2025) unmarked Bell 412EP, extensively outfitted with intelligence, surveillance, and reconnaissance (ISR) equipment, designated N23FH in honor of the 23 New York City police officers killed on September 11. In addition to advanced imaging and communication systems, the aircraft reportedly featured the ability to detect tracking beacons used by officers on the ground. After a decade of NYPD service, the helicopter was retired from the unit and replaced in January 2017 with a Cessna 208B Caravan. The new airplane was obtained with Federal Emergency Management Agency (FEMA) "Preparedness Grant" funding, and was delivered with airborne radiological detection capability. This unspecified equipment enables the airborne detection of dirty bombs from altitudes up to 200 feet (61 m) by, for example, overflying ships approaching New York Harbor.

== Fleet ==
The unit's fleet primarily consists of light-duty helicopters tasked with patrol duties and midsize utility helicopters for search and rescue and medevac missions.

Active
Entered service	Type	Quantity	Usage	Serial
2014-2015	Bell 429 GlobalRanger	4	Patrol	57148, 57188, 57220, 57233
	Bell 412EP	2	Utility, Rescue, Counter-terrorism	36516, 36563
2014	Bell 407	1	Training	53061
	Cessna 208 Caravan	1	Surveillance, counter-terrorism	N929NY

Formerly operated
Type	Quantity	Entered service	Serial	Fate (as of 2021)
Curtiss JN-4D Jenny		1919		
Salmson 2		1920		
Keystone–Loening Commuter	1	1929		
Savoia-Marchetti S.56	4	1929		
Fleet biplane	1			
Stinson SR-10K Reliant	2	1939		
Grumman G-21 Goose	1	1948		
Grumman G-44 Widgeon	1	1948		
Bell 47		1947-1950s		
Bell 206A Jet Ranger	unknown		330	Destroyed via mid-air collision in July 1983
Bell 206B-3 Jet Ranger	unknown		4262	Unknown
Bell 412SP	2		33126	Operated by Babcock Mission Critical Services for Government of Spain
Bell 412SP	2		33180	Privately operated in South Africa
Bell 412EP	5		36106	Privately operated in United States
Bell 412EP	5		36142	Operated by Houston Police Department
Bell 412EP	5		36233	Unknown
Bell 412EP	5	2003	36307	Operated by Montenegrin Air Force
Bell 412EP	5		36515	Destroyed via forced landing in September 2010
AgustaWestland AW119 Koala	4		14035	For sale as of September 2021
AgustaWestland AW119 Koala	4		14038	Privately operated in United States
AgustaWestland AW119 Koala	4		14039	Unknown
AgustaWestland AW119 Koala	4		14040	Privately operated in United States

== Personnel ==
As of February 2021, NYPD Aviation had 76 members. Prospective new hires are drawn from the department's force of existing police officers, and new pilots reportedly average 5 years of seniority with the department. Upon selection, they undergo training in helicopter flight operations and specialized missions like maritime search and rescue (SAR) and counterterrorism. The unit conducts flight training utilizing both a helicopter simulator and live instruction in its Bell 407.

Maintenance of the unit's aircraft is performed in-house, and its mechanics also double as crew chiefs.

== Notable incidents ==
- On the night of August 27, 2004, an NYPD Bell 412EP equipped for intelligence, surveillance, and reconnaissance (ISR) was used to film a couple having sex on the roof of their home. The helicopter was dispatched to monitor an unpermitted public assembly nearby, but the crew used its Wescam MX-15 thermographic camera to record the unwitting pair for nearly 4 minutes, prompting a civil complaint.
- In May 2021, a man was arrested in Brooklyn after aiming a green laser pointer at nearby helicopters, one of which was an NYPD Aviation unit. The aircraft's camera recorded the illumination event and was used to support felony endangerment charges.

== Accidents ==
- The unit's first helicopter loss occurred on December 21, 1967, when two crewmembers died in a crash near the Brooklyn Bridge.
- On March 1, 1970, a Bell 206 belonging to the unit lost power and crashed in Glen Oaks, Queens. Both crewmembers were killed on impact.
- On July 22, 1983, a fatal mid-air collision occurred between one of the unit's Bell 206 helicopters and a commercially operated Cessna 206 seaplane. The accident took place over Red Hook, Brooklyn and resulted in 4 deaths and 2 survivors.
- On September 22, 2010, one of the unit's Bell 412EP helicopters (registration N412PD) was substantially damaged after a gearbox failure resulted in a forced landing on Jamaica Bay. All 6 occupants escaped serious injury; the probable cause was determined to be fatigue cracking in the output drive gear resulting from manufacturing deficiencies. The aircraft was 18 months old at the time of the accident, and the City later filed a breach-of-contract lawsuit against manufacturer Bell Textron.
