= Jeffrey Maddrey =

American police chief in New York City (born 1971)

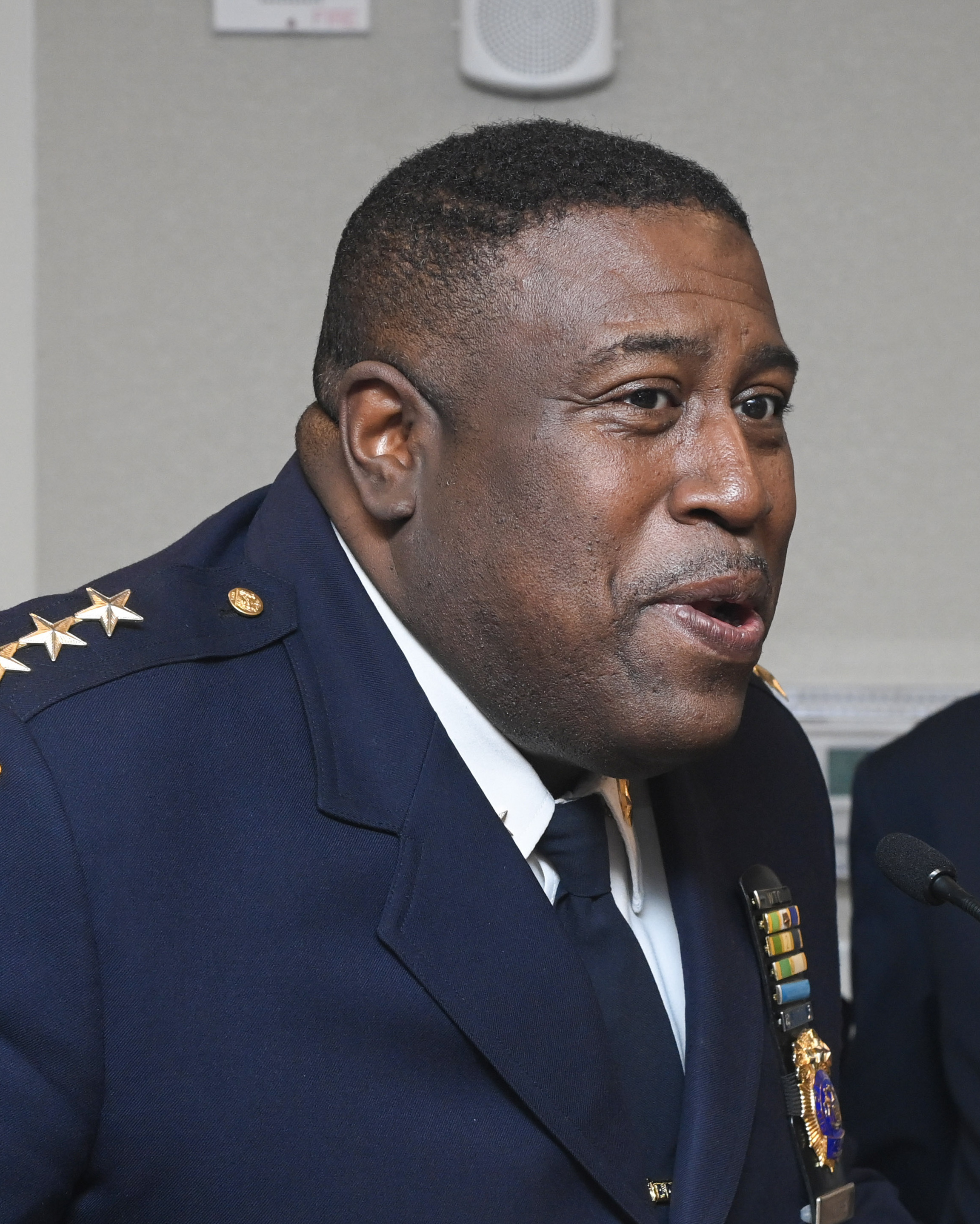

Chief of Department for the New York Police Department
- In office December 1, 2022 – December 20, 2024
- Commissioner: Keechant Sewell; Edward Caban; Thomas G. Donlon; Jessica Tisch
- Preceded by: Kenneth E. Corey
- Succeeded by: John Chell

Chief of Patrol for the New York Police Department
- In office May 28, 2022 – December 1, 2022
- Commissioner: Keechant Sewell
- Preceded by: Kathleen O’Reilly
- Succeeded by: John Chell

Chief of Housing for the New York Police Department
- In office January 20, 2022 – May 28, 2022
- Commissioner: Keechant Sewell
- Preceded by: David Barrere
- Succeeded by: Kathleen O’Reilly

Personal details
- Born: Jeffrey B. Maddrey
- Party: Democratic

Jeffrey B. Maddrey is an American former police officer who served as the chief of the New York Police Department until his resignation from that post following allegations of sexual misconduct. He was appointed to the position by New York City Mayor Eric Adams.

Maddrey was a former inspector in the 75th Precinct in Brooklyn and former assistant chief.

Maddrey was sued in 2016 by a subordinate in civil court, accusing him of assaulting her and making persistent sexual advances. Federal charges failed but he did face internal discipline.

In 2021, Maddrey was criticized for ordering the release of a retired officer who had been arrested for menacing children with a gun.

In 2024, an NYPD officer accused Maddrey in a lawsuit of causing his demotion after he ticketed Maddrey's friend for traffic violations.

== Sexual misconduct allegations ==
At the end of 2024, Jeffrey Maddrey, a high-ranking official in the New York City Police Department (NYPD), resigned following allegations of sexual misconduct. The allegations had surfaced after a female officer, Lt Quathisha Epps, who at the time had been a longtime subordinate in his office, came forward, detailing incidents of inappropriate behavior by Maddrey. According to Epps, Maddrey had made explicit sexual advances, including requesting that she kiss his penis and engage in anal sex. Epps claimed that the sexual demands began in June 2023, when Maddrey became the Chief of the Department. These allegations led to an internal investigation within the NYPD. Maddrey, who held a significant position within the department, stepped down from his role in response to the mounting pressure and the seriousness of the allegations. The NYPD took the allegations seriously and was cooperating with the investigation. The incident sparked widespread concern about the culture and conduct within the NYPD. Epps's account was corroborated by other evidence, leading to Maddrey's swift resignation. The NYPD reaffirmed its commitment to maintaining a workplace free from harassment and misconduct. The case was handled in accordance with departmental policies and legal procedures. Maddrey's resignation marked a significant development in continuing efforts to address and prevent sexual misconduct within the NYPD.

Police appointments
| Preceded by Kenneth E. Corey | NYPD Chief of Department; December 2022–December 2024 | Succeeded by John Chell |
| Preceded by Kathleen O'Reilly | NYPD Chief of Patrol; May 2022-December 2022 | Succeeded by John Chell |
| Preceded by David Barrere | NYPD Chief of Housing; January 2022-May 2022 | Succeeded by Kathleen O'Reilly |
| Preceded by Nilda Hofmann | NYPD Chief of Community Affairs; July 2020-January 2022 | Succeeded by Mark Stewart |
