= John Chell =

American law enforcement officer

Chief of Department for the New York Police Department
- In office Acting: December 20, 2024 – December 31, 2024; January 1, 2025 – October 8, 2025
- Commissioner: Jessica Tisch
- Preceded by: Jeffrey Maddrey
- Succeeded by: Mike Lipetri

Chief of Patrol for the New York Police Department
- In office December 2, 2022 – December 31, 2024
- Commissioner: Keechant Sewell; Jessica Tisch
- Preceded by: Jeffrey Maddrey
- Succeeded by: Phil Rivera

Personal details
- Born: John M. Chell

John M. Chell is an American law enforcement officer who served as the chief of department for the New York City Police Department (NYPD) from 2024 to 2025. He held various leadership roles within the NYPD, including chief of patrol, and has been involved in public safety operations, media relations, and departmental controversies.

== Career ==
=== Chief of Patrol ===
John M. Chell served as the chief of patrol for the New York City Police Department (NYPD) until he was succeeded by Phillip Rivera on December 31, 2024. His role involved overseeing public safety operations and media relations.

In April 2024, Chell faced scrutiny during an interview with WNYC radio host Brian Lehrer. Lehrer questioned him about his approach to responding to media criticism, specifically concerning allegations that his social media activity intimidated journalists. Chell denied these claims, emphasizing his intention to counter misinformation. Lehrer also raised a 2017 incident where Chell shot and killed a man during a car chase. While official reports classified the shooting as accidental, differing accounts led to a civil jury awarding $2.5 million to the deceased's family. Chell described the incident as a "tragic accident" and noted that he was cleared by the district attorney at the time.

In March 2024, Chell engaged in a dispute with journalist Harry Siegel over coverage of NYPD activities. This exchange drew criticism from within the department and the public.

In October 2024, Chell appeared on duty at a political rally for Donald Trump in his official NYPD uniform. During the event, he conducted interviews with multiple media outlets, including Newsmax. His appearance on Newsmax drew criticism from figures like Shahana Hanif, a City Council member, and Frank Figliuzzi, a former FBI assistant director, who expressed concerns about the perceived politicization of the NYPD. Mayor Adams responded “What do we believe John Chell did that was wrong? I’m not quite understanding people. Because when I looked at the interviews, he didn’t make any political statements. And he better have been in uniform, he was working. He was making sure that people who were attending the rally, walking down the block, that they were all protected.”

Chell has also faced accusations of violating the New York City Conflict of Interest Law through his social media activity. A group of 39 Democratic politicians criticized him for allegedly using his official NYPD account to attack lawmakers and journalists. The group called for disciplinary actions, citing concerns over his rhetoric and its implications for public trust.

In 2025, it was reported that Chell had faced internal discipline for tax evasion that took place from 1997 to 2003.

=== Chief of Department ===
In 2024, Chell was appointed by commissioner Jessica Tisch as the interim chief of department for the NYPD following the resignation of Jeffrey Maddrey. He is the highest-ranking uniformed position in the department. He was formally appointed to the role on December 31, 2024.

== Killing of Ortanzso Bovell ==
On August 7, 2008, Chell shot and killed Brooklyn resident Ortanzso Bovell in East Flatbush, Brooklyn. At the time, Chell was a lieutenant with the Patrol Boro Brooklyn South Auto Larceny Unit and approached Bovell in a vehicle with his weapon drawn. Chell claimed that he fired his weapon accidentally after being struck by Bovell's vehicle. Despite the city Medical Examiner ruling the shooting a homicide, the Brooklyn District attorney's office closed its investigation on the ground that the killing had been unintentional.

In a civil trial in 2017, Bovell's family was awarded $1.5 million dollars, after the jury determined that Chell had fired at Bovell intentionally.

Police appointments
Preceded by Jeffrey Maddrey	NYPD Chief of Department; Acting: December 20, 2024 – December 31, 2024 January 1, 2025 - October 8, 2025	Succeeded by Mike Lipetri(Interim)
Preceded by Jeffrey Maddrey	NYPD Chief of Patrol; 2022-2024	Succeeded by Philip P. Rivera
