= Murder of Chaim Weiss =

Unsolved 1986 murder

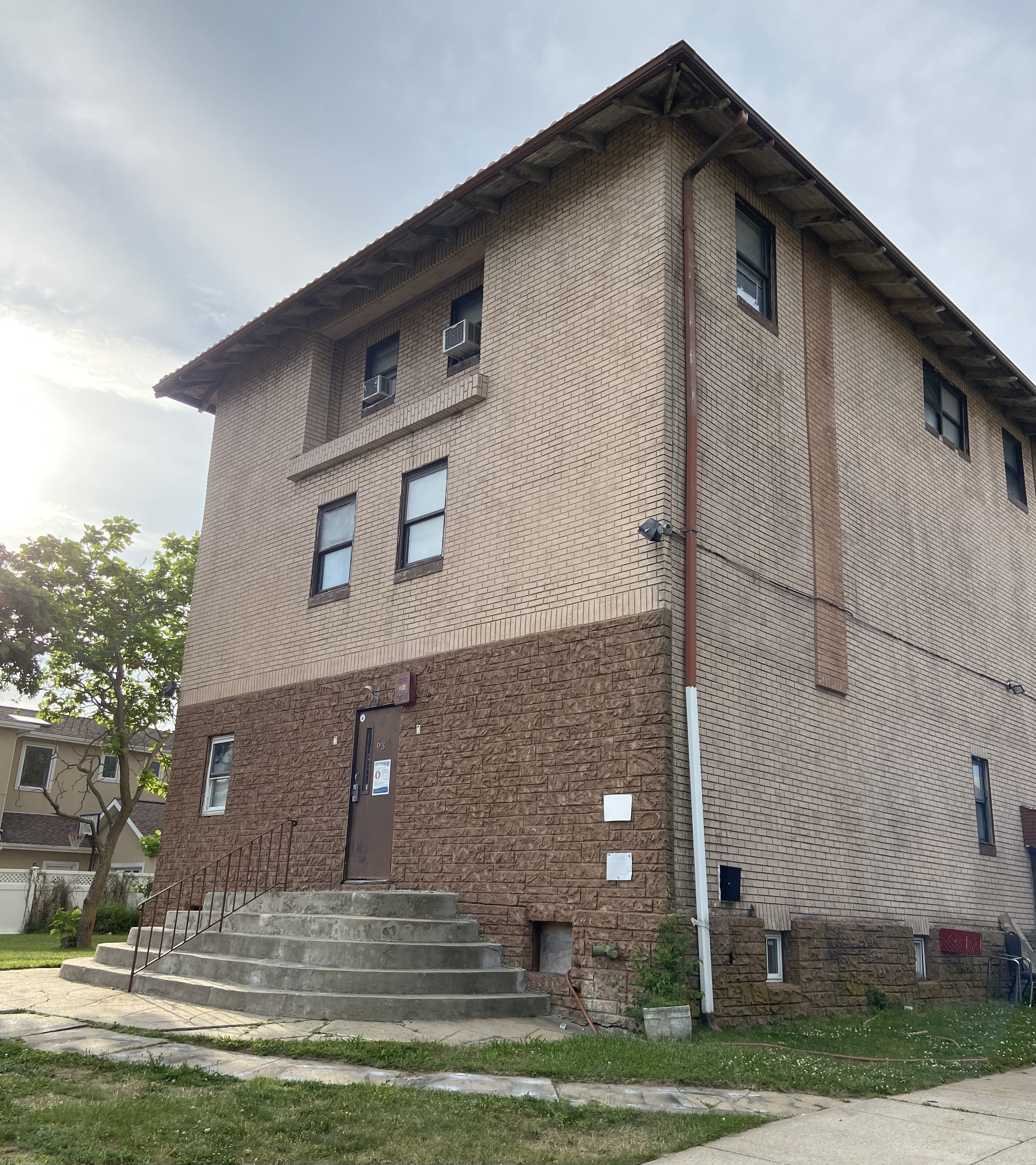
- 63 East Beech Street in Long Beach, New York, the site of the murder, as it appeared in 2021
- Location: Long Beach, New York, United States
- Date: November 1, 1986; 40 years ago
- Attack type: Bludgeoned to death
- Weapon: Hatchet-like weapon
- Victim: Chaim Weiss

The murder of Chaim Weiss, a 16-year-old student at the Torah High School yeshiva in Long Beach, New York, took place on November 1, 1986. Weiss was bludgeoned to death while sleeping in his dormitory room, with no motive or evidence being found except that his body and the crime scene were possibly tampered with.

Weiss' murder remains unsolved, though investigators believe the murderer was likely a student or faculty member of the yeshiva. The Daily News called it "one of New York’s most baffling unsolved mysteries". In 2013, the Nassau County Police Department announced they would reopen their investigation into the murder.

== Murder and crime scene ==
On November 1, 1986, between the hours of 1:20 and 6:00 AM, Chaim Weiss was killed while sleeping at Torah High School, an Orthodox Jewish yeshiva at 63 East Beech Street in Long Beach, New York. Weiss, a 16-year-old student at the yeshiva, was sleeping alone in his third-floor dormitory room, being one of only two students in the dormitory to have his own room. There was no back door to the room. Weiss was struck twice in the head by a large knife or hatchet-like weapon with such force that it crushed his skull and severed his spinal column, in what a detective described as "an extremely brutal murder". His body had been moved to the floor, the window of his room was opened, and the murder weapon was never recovered. Weiss was last seen alive at approximately 12:45 AM Saturday morning by a study partner. His parents, Anton and Pessy Weiss, were living in Willowbrook, Staten Island and only received word of his death towards the end of Shabbat, when notified by local police. 1,000 mourners attended Weiss' funeral service at the Shomrei Hadas Chapel in the Borough Park section of Brooklyn.

=== Peculiarities ===
There were multiple peculiarities that led police to believe that the murderer was knowledgeable in Jewish rituals of death. The window was found open which, according to police, may be a Jewish custom to allow the deceased's soul to depart. This was strange as the outside temperature was 40°F (4°C) and Weiss was taking antibiotics for a sore throat, making it unlikely that he would have opened it. Weiss' body was found on the floor, clad in pajamas, and with his feet propped on the bed. Police determined that the body was in the bed for several hours after the attack.

A few months before the murder, while Weiss was spending the summer at home, the principal of Torah High School called his home twice, seeking to set up a meeting with him. His parents stated that he did not want to talk about what was discussed in his private meeting with the principal at a Brooklyn home.

In 1994 a letter was sent to the late Chaim Weiss at his parents' house in Staten Island. In the letter was a humorous Easter card which read "Know what happens to chickens when they are too old to lay Easter eggs? They dye." Around that time, a stone slab at the decedent's gravesite was vandalized with three Hebrew letters. The message appears to be Hebrew for "murder", but with the last letter incorrect.

== Investigation ==
Yeshiva officials refused to discuss the case extensively until after Shabbat. Investigators looked into a janitor and a mentally ill man and also considered the possibility that the murder was committed by a Halloween thrill-seeker. The suspects and the thrill-seeker theory were since ruled out. School administrators told the media that they had no previous issues with antisemitism. Police assigned 25 detectives to the case full time for months, and a mobile command center was situated outside the yeshiva for a week open for anyone to share information. A single strand of hair not belonging to Weiss was found near his body. The police are waiting for a suspect before running a DNA test on the sample, for fear of ruining it. An FBI profile suggested the killer was someone Weiss knew and around his age. There was no sign of forced entry or sexual assault and no students reported hearing sounds of a struggle.

Anton Weiss was disappointed with the Nassau County Police Department's handling of the case and requested the naming of a special prosecutor, though that never happened.

=== Reopening of case ===
In May 2013, Nassau County police reopened the case and increased the reward to $25,000 for information leading to an arrest. Anton Weiss appeared at the press conference alongside police urging former students at Torah High School to come forward with any information.

After a PIX 11 interview with Anton Weiss in 2017, the outlet reported that a former student at the yeshiva came forward alleging physical abuse a decade before the murder. They also reported on a suicide by hanging in the yeshiva dorm shower several years before the murder.

== Media ==
Weiss' murder was the subject of episode 4.30 of Unsolved Mysteries and was featured on the true crime podcast Killer Instincts.

== See also ==
- List of unsolved murders
