= John B. Pickett fellowship =

American law enforcement fellowship

The John B. Pickett fellowship is a National Institute of Justice fellowship program for law enforcement practitioners seeking either a mid-career Master of Public Administration or an intensive 3 weeks of education for senior-level executives at Harvard University's Kennedy School of Government. It was founded in 1997 in honor of John B. Pickett, the first director of planning and management at the National Institute of Justice. One fellowship is awarded each year.

== List of notable alumni ==
- New York State Assemblyman Bob Castelli (three-week program)
- Edward F. Davis, commissioner of the Boston Police Department (three-week program)
- Jerome Holmes, federal judge on the United States Court of Appeals for the Tenth Circuit (master's program)
- Richard Pennington, former chief of the Atlanta Police Department and New Orleans Police Department (three-week program)
- New York City Police Department First Deputy Commissioner Rafael Piñeiro (three-week program)
