= Tania Kinsella =

American police commissioner (born 1980)

First Deputy Commissioner of the New York City Police Department
- Incumbent
- Assumed office July 17, 2023
- Commissioner: Jessica Tisch
- Appointed By: Edward Caban
- Preceded by: Edward Caban

Personal details
- Born: Tania Mohabeer
- Education: John Jay College of Criminal Justice (BS, MA)
- Police career
- Department: New York City Police Department
- Service years: 2003-present

Tania Kinsella is an American police officer and First Deputy Commissioner of the New York City Police Department appointed in July 2023 by Mayor Eric Adams. Kinsella previously served as executive officer of the Office of the Chief of Patrol, where she was promoted to deputy chief.

== Early life ==
Kinsella possesses a Bachelor of Science degree in Legal Studies, as well as a Master of Arts degree in Police Leadership and Criminal Justice from the John Jay College of Criminal Justice.

== Career ==
Kinsella began her journey within the NYPD in 2003, initially as a police officer, taking to the streets of the 122nd Precinct on Staten Island. She achieved the rank of sergeant in 2008, assuming responsibilities at the 68th Precinct located in Brooklyn.

She was promoted to the role of lieutenant in 2013, with her duties centered at the 13th Precinct in Manhattan. In 2016, Tania Kinsella's ascent continued as she earned the title of captain. This phase inaugurated with her serving as the executive officer of the 120th Precinct. Notably, 2018 witnessed her appointment as the commanding officer of Housing Police Service Area 1, a role she undertook until her elevation to the rank of deputy inspector in 2019.

The subsequent year, 2020, bore witness to her return as the commander of the 120th Precinct. She achieved the rank of inspector in 2021. Venturing into 2022, Tania Kinsella undertook the role of executive officer within the Office of the Chief of Patrol, subsequently attaining the position of deputy chief.

She was designated First Deputy Commissioner of the New York City Police Department on July 17, 2023.
