= Benjamin B. Tucker =

American police officer

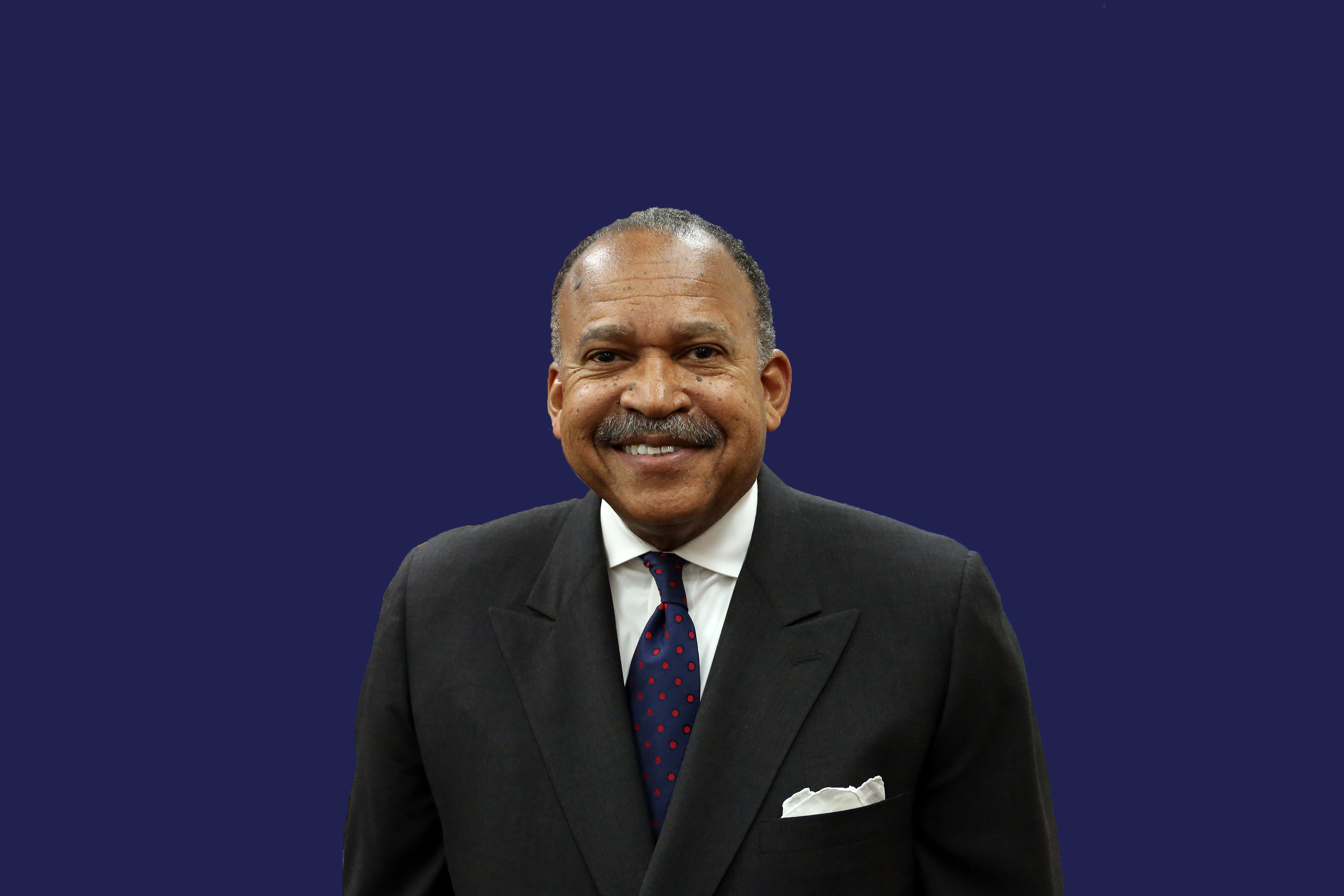

First Deputy New York City Police Commissioner
- In office November 5, 2014 – December 31, 2021
- Appointed by: William Bratton
- Preceded by: Rafael Piñeiro
- Succeeded by: Edward Caban

Deputy Head of the U.S. Office of National Drug Control Policy for State, Local and Tribal Affairs
- In office 2009–2014

Personal details
- Born: Benjamin B. Tucker; 1951 (age 74–75) Bedford-Stuyvesant, Brooklyn
- Spouse: Diana Tucker
- Education: John Jay College; City University of New York; Fordham University

Benjamin B. Tucker is an American police officer and administrator who was appointed First Deputy New York City Police Commissioner on Nov. 5, 2014, in a ceremony at 1 Police Plaza in New York City. Commissioner Tucker is the NYPD's 43rd first deputy commissioner. "This is an amazing moment and time in my life," Tucker said. "I joined the NYPD family on November 21, 1969, as an 18-year-old." He was sworn in as a police officer trainee at that time, and is now second in command of the nation's largest police force with a uniformed strength just shy of 35,000, plus several thousand in support staff. He later retired from the New York Police Department in December 2021.

== Career ==
With more than four decades of experience in the fields of law enforcement and criminal justice. Tucker left the NYPD in the 1980s to work for the city's Civilian Complaint Review Board and several other director positions with the Ed Koch administration. He also worked with former Manhattan Borough President Ruth Messinger and He ultimately retired from the force in 1991.

In September 1995, Mr. Tucker was appointed by President William Jefferson Clinton and served as deputy director for Operations in the Office of Community Oriented Policing Services at the U.S. Department of Justice, where he was responsible for funding decisions and recommendations resulting in the awarding and oversight of grants to state and local law enforcement agencies in excess of five billion dollars.

Deputy commissioner Tucker is a recognized expert in community policing. Prior to joining ONDCP, Mr. Tucker served as a professor of criminal justice at Pace University. He has also worked as a consultant to the Urban Institute and as Director of Field Operations and Senior Research Associate at the National Center on Addiction and Substance Abuse at Columbia University. Within government, Mr. Tucker served as deputy director for Operations at the U.S. Department of Justice, Office of Community Oriented Policing Services; executive director of the New York City Commission on Human Rights; Deputy Assistant Director for Law Enforcement Services in the Office of New York City Mayor Michael Bloomberg as Chief Executive for School Safety and Planning at the New York City Department of Education. On June 22, 2010, the U.S. Senate confirmed Tucker's nomination as deputy director of State, Local and Tribal Affairs for the Office of National Drug Control Policy (ONDCP).

"He has an intimate understanding of crime, drug abuse, youth and the law," said Commissioner Bratton at a police headquarters news conference. "These areas make up the essential challenges facing the New York City Police Department this time in our history." Mr. Bratton further commented that Mr. Tucker would be a powerful leader in an "extraordinarily powerful and impactful position," During his time as Deputy Police Commissioner, Tucker oversaw the New York Police Department's most integral operations.

== Education ==
Deputy Commissioner Tucker holds a Bachelor of Science degree in Criminal Justice from John Jay College of Criminal Justice, in 1977
City University of New York and a Juris Doctor (J.D.) from Fordham University School of Law.

== Joined the NYPD "quite by accident" ==
"I had a buddy of mine, James, ring my bell, and one morning he said, "Lets go take this exam" Tucker said. "I said 'What exam?'
And he said, 'Police exam,' and that's how it happened. It was quite by accident, but it turned my life around. "I kind of grew up in
this department," he said, "and this department gave me opportunities, I would probably never have had as a kid from Bedford-Stuyvesant, Brooklyn."

== Dates of rank ==
Appointed Police trainee - 1969
Sworn in as a Patrolman - 1972
Promoted to Sergeant - 1983
Active Retiree - 1991
Promoted to Deputy Commissioner, Training - 2014
Appointed to First Deputy New York City Police Commissioner - 2014

Police appointments
Preceded by Rafael Piñeiro	First Deputy New York City Police Commissioner; 2014-2021	Succeeded by Edward Caban
