= Rafael Piñeiro =

American police chief

First Deputy New York City Police Commissioner
- In office September 2010 – October 2014
- Appointed by: Raymond W. Kelly
- Preceded by: George Grasso
- Succeeded by: Benjamin B. Tucker

Chief of Personnel, New York City Police Department
- In office 2002–2010
- Preceded by: James Lawrence
- Succeeded by: Thomas Dale

Personal details
- Born: Rafael Piñeiro; 1949 (age 76–77) Valencia, Spain
- Education: New York Institute of Technology; Brooklyn Law School; New York University; Columbia University; Harvard University

Rafael Piñeiro (born 1949) is the former First Deputy Commissioner of the New York City Police Department (NYPD) and at that time the highest ranking Hispanic American member of the NYPD. In November 2013, he was rumored to be on Mayor-elect Bill de Blasio's short list to replace Ray Kelly as NYPD Commissioner.

== Law enforcement career and background ==
Piñeiro was born in Valencia, Spain. He immigrated with his family from Cuba to the United States of America when he was 12. After graduating from the New York Institute of Technology with a Bachelor of Science in Behavioral Science, he was appointed to the NYPD in June 1970 after graduating at the top of his New York City Police Academy class and receiving the Chief of Personnel's Award for the highest combined academic and physical fitness scores.

According to his official biography, he was promoted up the ranks to Deputy Chief in 1991 and Assistant Chief in 1994. When he was promoted to Deputy Chief he was the Commanding Officer of the Police Commissioner's Office and later the Executive Officer of Patrol Borough Bronx. As Assistant Chief he served as Executive Officer Housing Bureau and was the Commanding Officer of the following commands; Patrol Borough Bronx, Criminal Justice Bureau, Management Information Systems Division, Personnel Bureau In 1995, he founded the National Law Enforcement Explorer Academy. He served as executive officer of the 17th Precinct, commander of the 41st Precinct. In 2002, he was appointed Chief of Personnel and became the longest serving Chief of Personnel in NYPD history. He was elevated to First Deputy Commissioner in 2010. His awards and decorations include the Police Combat Cross, the Department's second highest award for valor, which he received for confronting a gun wielding suspect who had robbed a convenience store. In 2010 he became the first Hispanic-American ever appointed as First Deputy Commissioner of the New York City Police Department.

Rafael Pineiro serves at the chief executive assistant and advisor to the Police Commissioner in the management and administration of the Police Department and assumes the duties and responsibilities of the Police Commissioner in his absence. He maintains responsibility for the highest levels of policy formation, program development and decision making in the NYPD and is responsible for four major commands responsible for critical aspects of agency operations; the Personnel Bureau, Support Services Bureau, Criminal Justice Bureau and Office of Labor Relations. The First Deputy Commissioner is the highest level representative of the Police Commissioner and serves on his behalf as executive liaison to the city, state and federal criminal justice and law enforcement agencies and represents the Police Commissioner at meetings and conferences conducted to address and resolve high level policy, program and procedural issues with agency-wide ramifications.

Piñeiro graduated with a Juris Doctor from Brooklyn Law School, holds a Master of Public Administration from New York University's Robert F. Wagner Graduate School of Public Service a graduate of the inaugural class of the Police Management Institute at Columbia University. In 1995, he attended the Kennedy School of Government at Harvard University as a Pickett Fellow in Criminal Justice. He is married to Sheila Ahern.

== Speculation on appointment as NYPD Commissioner ==
Even before the 2013 New York City mayoral election, Piñeiro was referenced as a potential replacement for NYPD Police Commissioner Ray Kelly. During a televised debate, de Blasio's opponent, Joe Lhota, stated Piñeiro would be his pick to replace Kelly were he elected.

After de Blasio indicated during the campaign that he would seek a new Commissioner for the NYPD, the NYPD Hispanic Society held a press conference along with the New York Dominican Officers Organization and National Latino Officers Association advocating for Rafael Pineiro to be considered and given an opportunity to be interviewed based on his credentials and qualifications. The Hispanic Society President Detective Dennis Gonzalez stated that he would be the first Hispanic-American to ever serve as Police Commissioner. In his statement, Gonzalez stated is this, "a tale of two cities, one white and one black, Latinos not included", apparently referencing the fact that Pineiro was not being recognized in the mainstream media but non-Hispanics were."

In November 2013, he formally met with Mayor-elect de Blasio during the annual New York Hispanic legislative conference Somos El Futuro in Puerto Rico to discuss the NYPD transition. Much like Kelly, whom de Blasio stated he would not be reappointing, Piñeiro rose through the ranks of the NYPD from a beat cop to the highest echelon of its hierarchy. Other candidates who met with de Blasio included former NYPD Commissioner Bill Bratton and current NYPD Chief of Department Philip Banks III. Bratton was ultimately appointed on December 5, 2013.

== Retirement ==
Rafael Pineiro retired in October 2014.

== See also ==
- New York City Police Department

Police appointments
Preceded by George Grasso	First Deputy New York City Police Commissioner; 2010-2014	Succeeded by Benjamin B. Tucker
