= Nassau County Police Department =

Law enforcement agency of Nassau County, New York

Coordinates: 40.736706°N 73.639151°W

- Patch of the Nassau County Police Department

- Seal of the Nassau County Police Department

- Flag of the Nassau County Police Department
- Abbreviation: NCPD

Agency overview
- Formed: 1925

Jurisdictional structure
- Operations jurisdiction: Nassau County, New York, USA
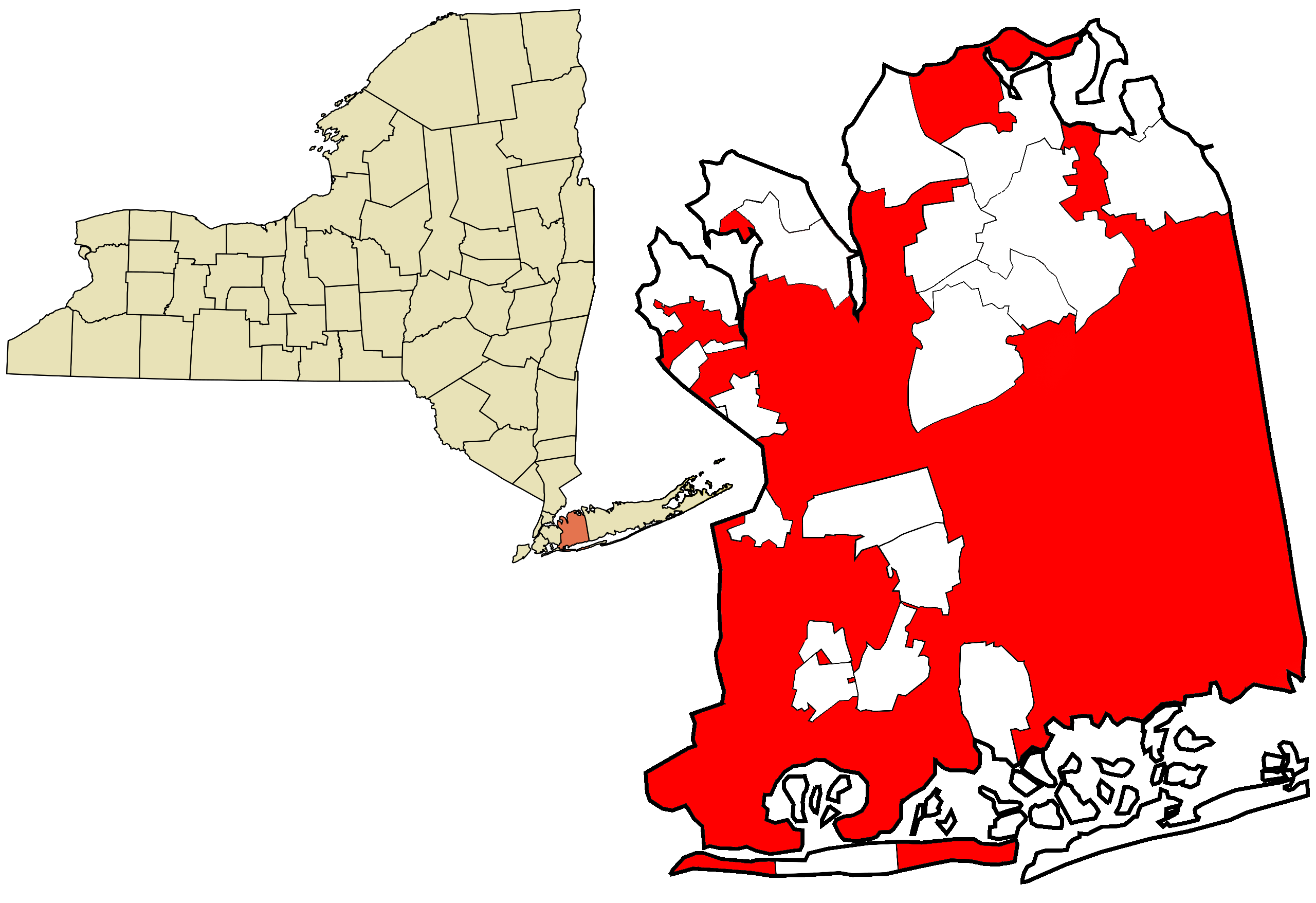
- Map of the Nassau County Police Department's jurisdiction (red)
- Area: 287 square miles (land); 166 square miles (water)
- Population: 1,334,544
- Legal jurisdiction: Nassau County, New York
- General nature: Local civilian police

Operational structure
- Police Officers: 2,400 (2018)
- Police Commissioner responsible: Patrick J. Ryder
- Agency executive: Stephen Palmer, Chief

Facilities
- Precincts: 8
- Airbases: 1
- Marine Units: 6
- Helicopters: 3

Website
- www.pdcn.org

Nassau County, New York, on Long Island, has been ranked by U.S. News and World Report as having the lowest crime rate in the U.S. The Nassau County Police Department (also referred to as the Nassau Police and Nassau County Police and abbreviated as NCPD) is the law enforcement agency of Nassau County.

== History ==
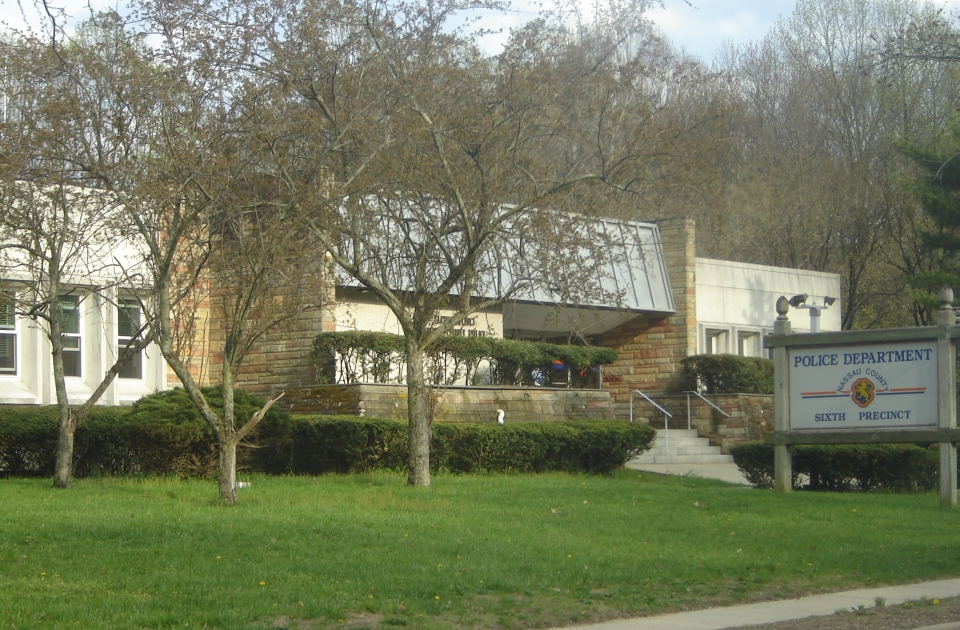
The Sixth Precinct's headquarters in Manhasset

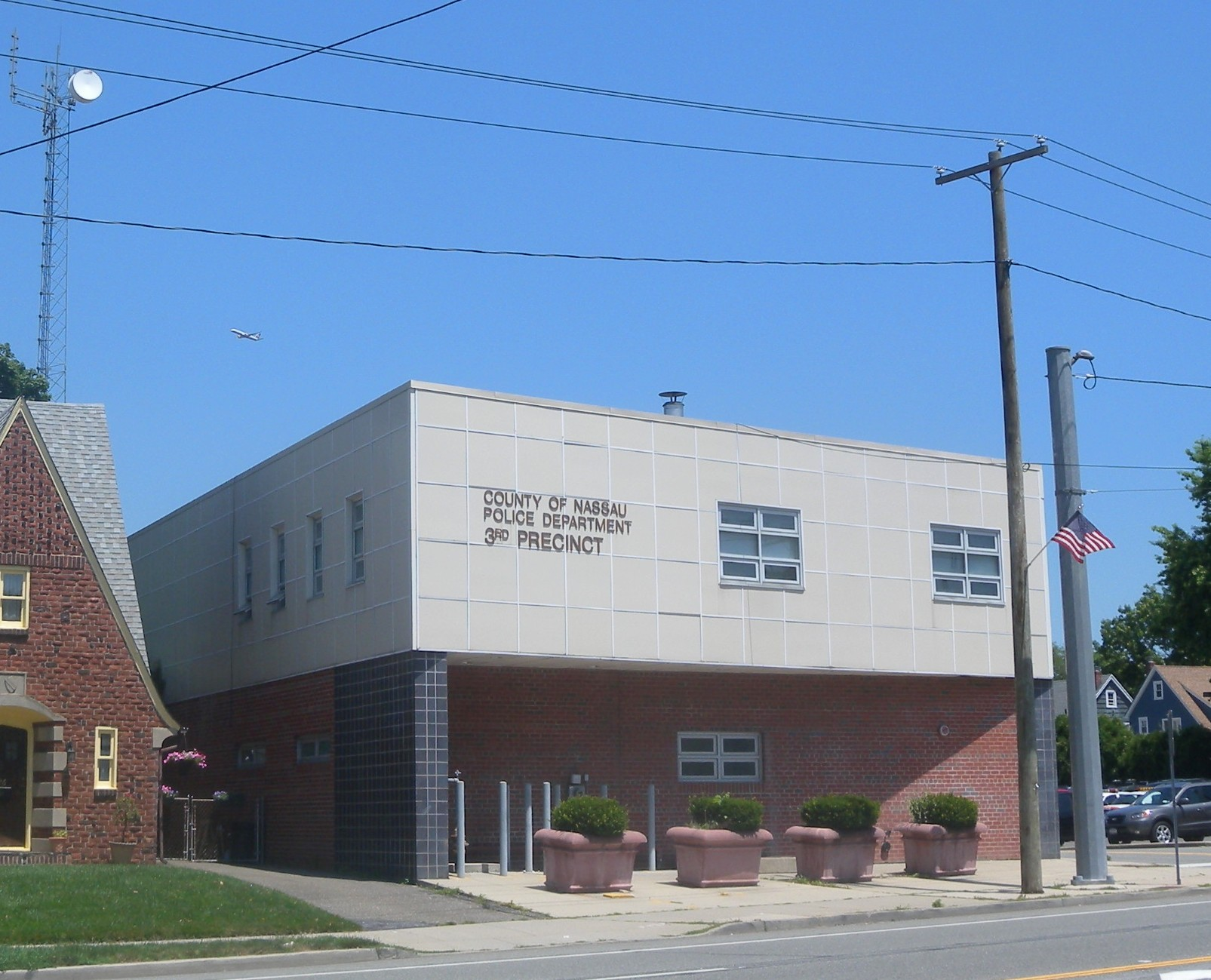
The Third Precinct's headquarters in Williston Park

In 1925, concerned about rising crime rates, the County Board of Supervisors voted to create the Nassau County Police Department, replacing a scattered system of constables and town and village police departments. Some jurisdictions declined to join the police district, however, and have opted to maintain their own independent police forces to this day (i.e.: the Port Washington Police District). Consisting initially of Chief of Police (later Commissioner) Abram Skidmore, 55 officers (absorbed from the Nassau County Deputy Sheriff's) and a fingerprint expert, the force grew to 450 officers by 1932 and reached 650 officers by the time Skidmore retired in 1945.

The expansion accelerated dramatically following World War II with the rapid suburbanization of the county. It reached 1,000 officers in six precincts by 1950. A seventh precinct was opened in 1955 and an eighth followed five years later. In the early 1970s, with crime and civil disorder in neighboring New York City and other cities a major concern, the force was boosted to its greatest strength, nearly 4,200 officers. Since then, it has declined to around 2,600, and it remains one of the largest county police agencies in the United States.

In 1989 officers were equipped with 9mm SIG Sauer P226 semi-automatic pistols to replace older .38 Special revolvers.

Nevertheless, the department's reduced size has been a source of controversy, with the village of Mineola exploring the idea of seceding from the police district and establishing its own police force. On December 5, 2006, however, the village's voters decisively rejected the proposal, 2,936 to 1,288.

In October 2011, the Nassau County Legislature voted on a budget that had the effect of closing three of the eight precincts. In March 2012 the Levittown station was chosen to be the first to be reduced to a "Community Policing Center" followed by the 5th Precinct in Elmont, and 6th Precinct in Manhasset. All previously closed Precincts have since reopened.

The department is headed by a civilian commissioner, appointed by the county executive. On January 24, 2018, County Executive Laura Curran appointed Patrick Ryder, the former commanding Officer of the Asset Forfeiture & Intelligence Unit, as Commissioner. On February 26, 2018, after being unanimously confirmed by the Nassau County Legislature, Ryder was sworn in as Nassau County police commissioner.

In April 2019 the county announced an agreement had been reached between the Democrat County executive and Republican-controlled County legislature, and on April 10, 2019, the 6th Precinct in Manhasset and the 8th Precinct in Levittown were reopened, restoring the department to its original 8 precinct Size.

The NCPD's guiding philosophy is that it is a "service-oriented" police department, promoting the concept of the community as client, and the police as provider. (For example, officers will come to a citizen's home to take a crime report or complaint, rather than ask the citizen to come to the precinct.) Sociologist James Q. Wilson used the Nassau department as the exemplar of this approach in his classic 1968 study, Varieties of Police Behavior.

== Equipment ==
The department has historically been known to quickly embrace new technologies. The Marine Bureau began in 1933 with the gift of an 18-foot Chris Craft mahogany speedboat from the residents of Manhasset Bay. The Aviation Bureau followed a year later with the gift of a Stinson airplane from wealthy county residents. The aircraft was grounded by World War II, but the air unit was revived in 1968 with the purchase of four helicopters to assist in pursuits and medical evacuations. The elite Highway Patrol Bureau, which covers the Long Island Expressway and the Seaford-Oyster Bay Expressway and includes motorcycle officers, was founded in 1935. All police vehicles are now equipped with computer keyboards, and, since 1973, air conditioning.

In addition to these units, the department also maintains many features, such as a Detective Bureau, a police academy, a mounted unit, an arson/bomb squad, a hostage negotiation team, a citizen-based auxiliary police program, a bureau of special operations (SWAT and anti-crime combined) and an Emergency Services Unit (ESU), that are usually found only in the police departments of large cities. The department also adopted its own system for computerized tracking of crime information, formerly known as NASSTAT, but now called Strat-Com. All homicides and auto-related fatalities are investigated by the NCPD, regardless of whether or not they occurred in the police district.

Traffic safety is a major department priority, given Nassau's relative lack of public transportation and its perpetually clogged roads and highways. A unique feature of the department is its Children's Safety Town, an actual village built to 1/3 scale that includes paved streets, two intersections equipped with traffic signals, an overpass, two tunnels, a simulated railroad crossing and 21 buildings. Managed by the department's Traffic Safety Unit, it allows the NCPD to teach traffic and bicycle safety to grade schoolers under controlled conditions.

In July 2025, the department went a step further and opened its "Training Village," a model neighborhood that aims to train officers based on realistic scenarios. The village has about 10 buildings, including a warehouse, gas station and grocery store. The idea for the village came about when the department realized that classroom and academy-based training wasn't adequately preparing officers for the unpredictable realities of daily police work. The village allows trainers to stage a wide variety of incidents, from active shooter and hostage situations to more routine disturbances.

In 1989, concerned about the increasingly heavy weaponry being carried by criminals, the NCPD was among the first police departments in the country to trade their venerable 6 shot .38 Smith & Wesson revolvers for the 15-round, nine-millimeter SIG P226 semi-automatic pistol. In 2009, the department announced it is switching over to the SIG P229 and SIG P226, chambered for .40 S&W with the Double Action Kellerman (DAK) trigger and integral accessory rail as the new standard firearm. In September 2023, the NCPD began transitioning to the Glock Model 45, chambered in 9mm. Also, officers are re-equipping with expandable batons to replace the straight wooden nightstick.

In 1995, the NCPD became the largest police department in the country to that time, and the first in New York State, to allow its officers to work a steady 10- or 12-hour shift, rather than a rotating 8-hour shift commencing at a different time each week. In early 2007, the NCPD announced that 207 marked patrol vehicles would be equipped with Global Positioning System (GPS) devices, allowing "live" views of the location of all active units.

In late 2006, the department undertook "Operation Gotcha," deploying a new technology that scans the license plate numbers of passing vehicles directly into a mobile crime computer, allowing the immediate apprehension of drivers operating vehicles with expired licenses, suspended registrations or with outstanding arrest warrants. The technology allows the scanning of literally thousands of plates in a single shift.

=== Firearms ===
- SIG Sauer P226 DAK and SIG Sauer P229 DAK, both in .40 S&W—officers have their choice and both weapons replaced older 9mm SIG Sauer P226 pistols.
- SIG Sauer SIGM400
- Glock 45 9mm

=== Police vehicles ===
In the 1990s, the department exclusively used Ford Crown Victorias and Chevrolet Caprices as their main patrol cars. Mounted units used Chevrolet Suburbans.

In 2003, the department switched to the 2000–2005 Chevrolet Impala 9C1. The Ford Crown Victoria was still purchased, albeit in smaller quantities. The department favored the "CVPI" due to the rear-wheel drive and V8 configuration. The department switched back to the Crown Victoria in 2006. Few Impalas are still in service in 2019.

Model year 2006–2010 Dodge Chargers were tested for highway patrol use. The Dodge Charger was a performance leader; however, due to maintenance costs, the department did not use many and few are still in service as of 2018.

The department tried Chevrolet Tahoes in 2010 and they were given to certain sectors. The vehicle proved to be a strong patrol car with good all-weather capability and was a valuable asset during Hurricane Sandy. The Chevrolet Caprice 9C1 was tried out in 2014 and was given to precincts and highway patrol.

The mounted unit operates Chevrolet Tahoes and Suburbans. Highway patrol utilizes the Ford Police Interceptor, Ford Crown Victoria, Chevrolet Caprice and Dodge Charger. The Auxiliary Police unit uses a variety of ex-marked Nassau County Police cars, the majority of which being Ford Crown Victorias and Chevrolet Impalas.

Nassau County Highway Patrol now utilizes 2021-2022 Dodge Chargers and Late model Chevrolet Tahoes for patrol.

Nassau County ended up switching to the Ford Utility Interceptor as their main choice for RMP. Today, the Ford Utility Interceptor is the most widely used car in the fleet.

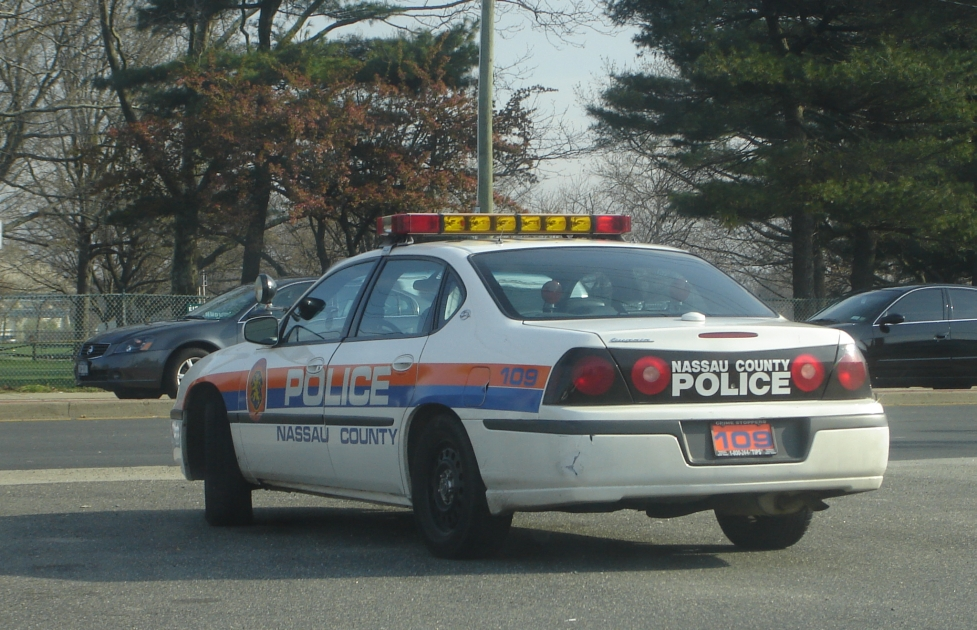
Chevy Impala patrol vehicle at Hempstead Turnpike and Merrick Avenue

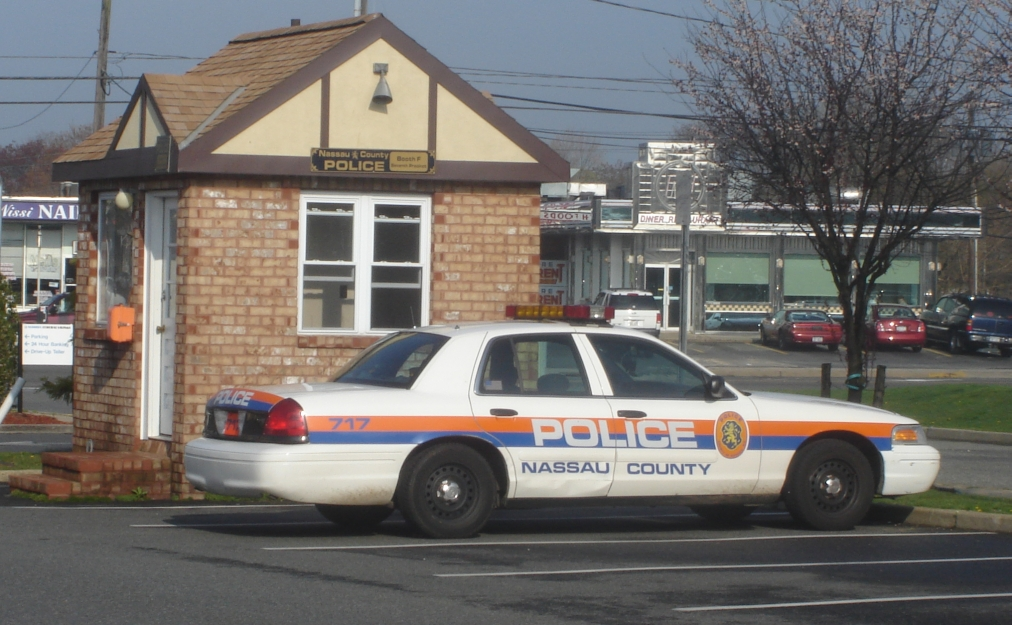
A Ford Crown Victoria Police Interceptor model NCPD marked patrol vehicle parked at Booth F in Wantagh

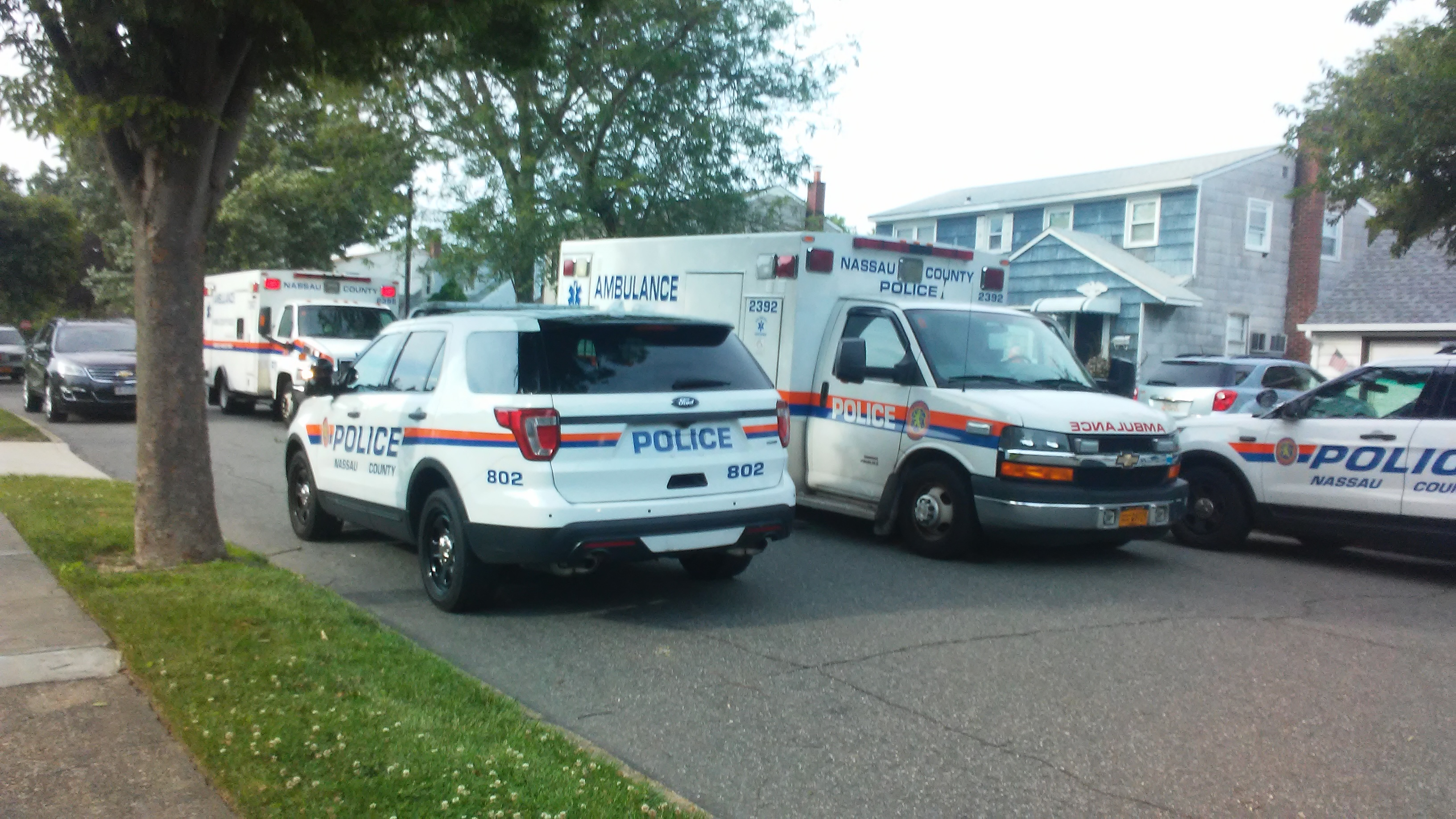
Nassau County Police and EMTs

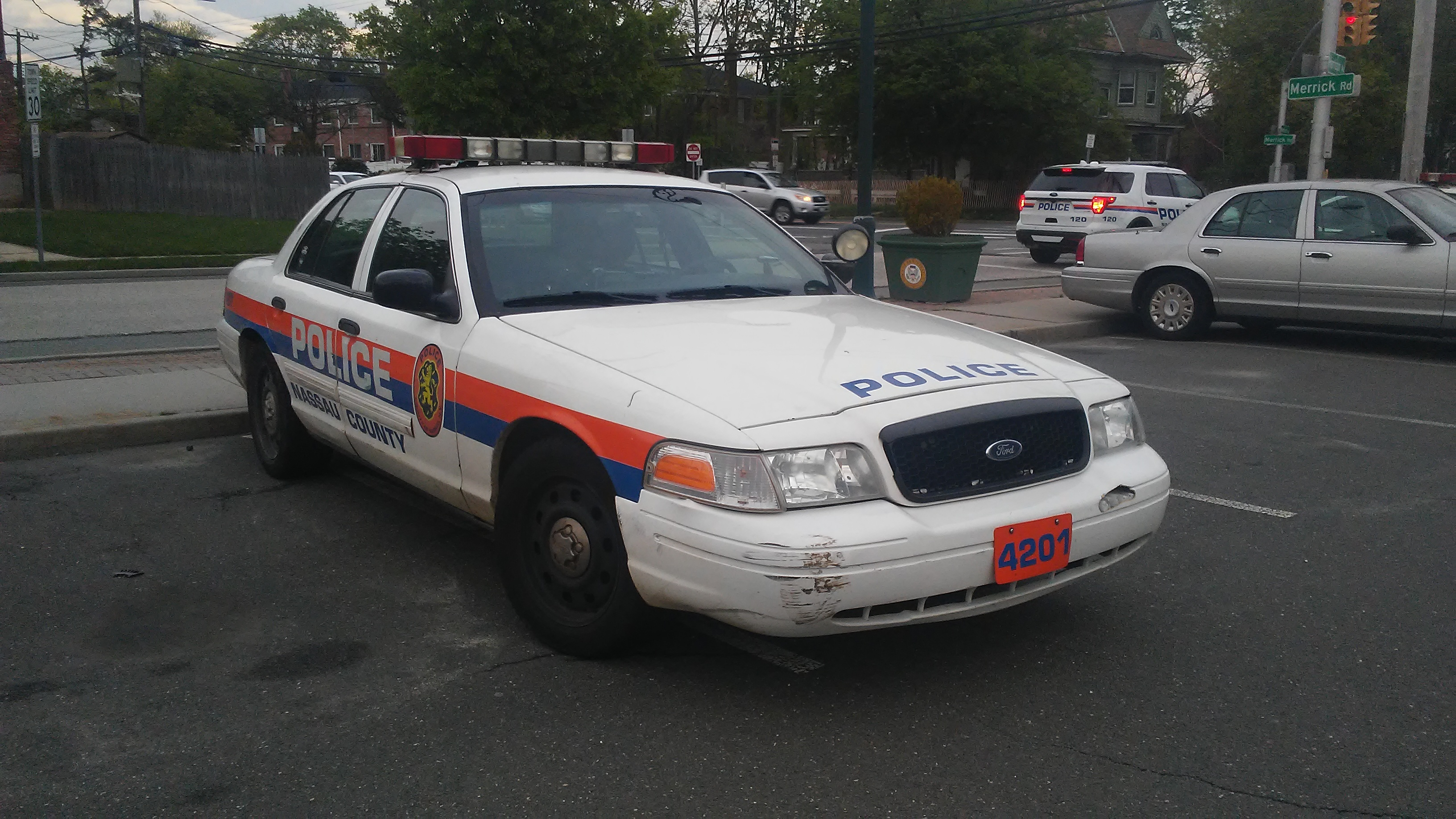
A spare unit Ford Crown Victoria P71

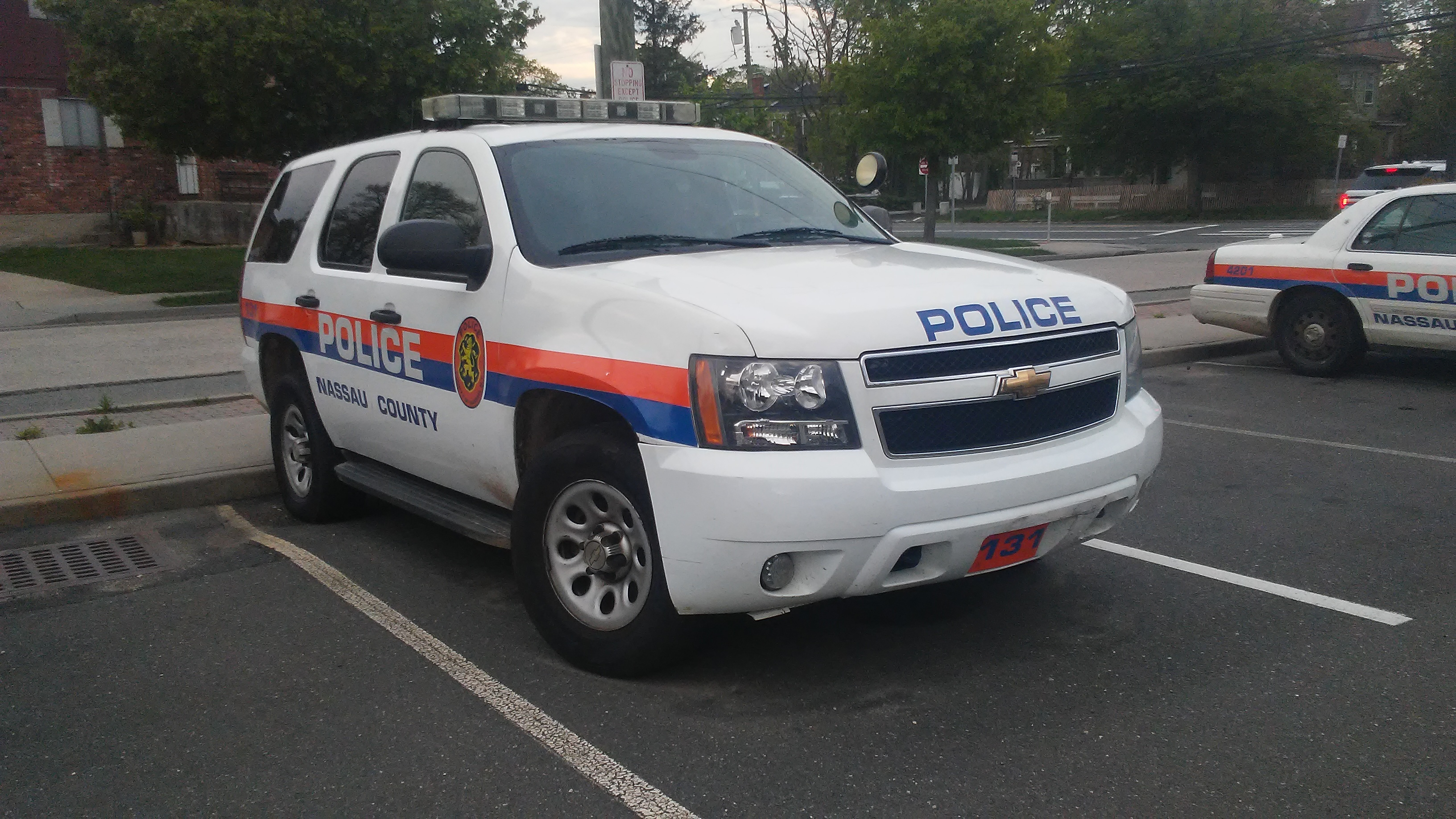
A First Precinct Chevrolet Tahoe

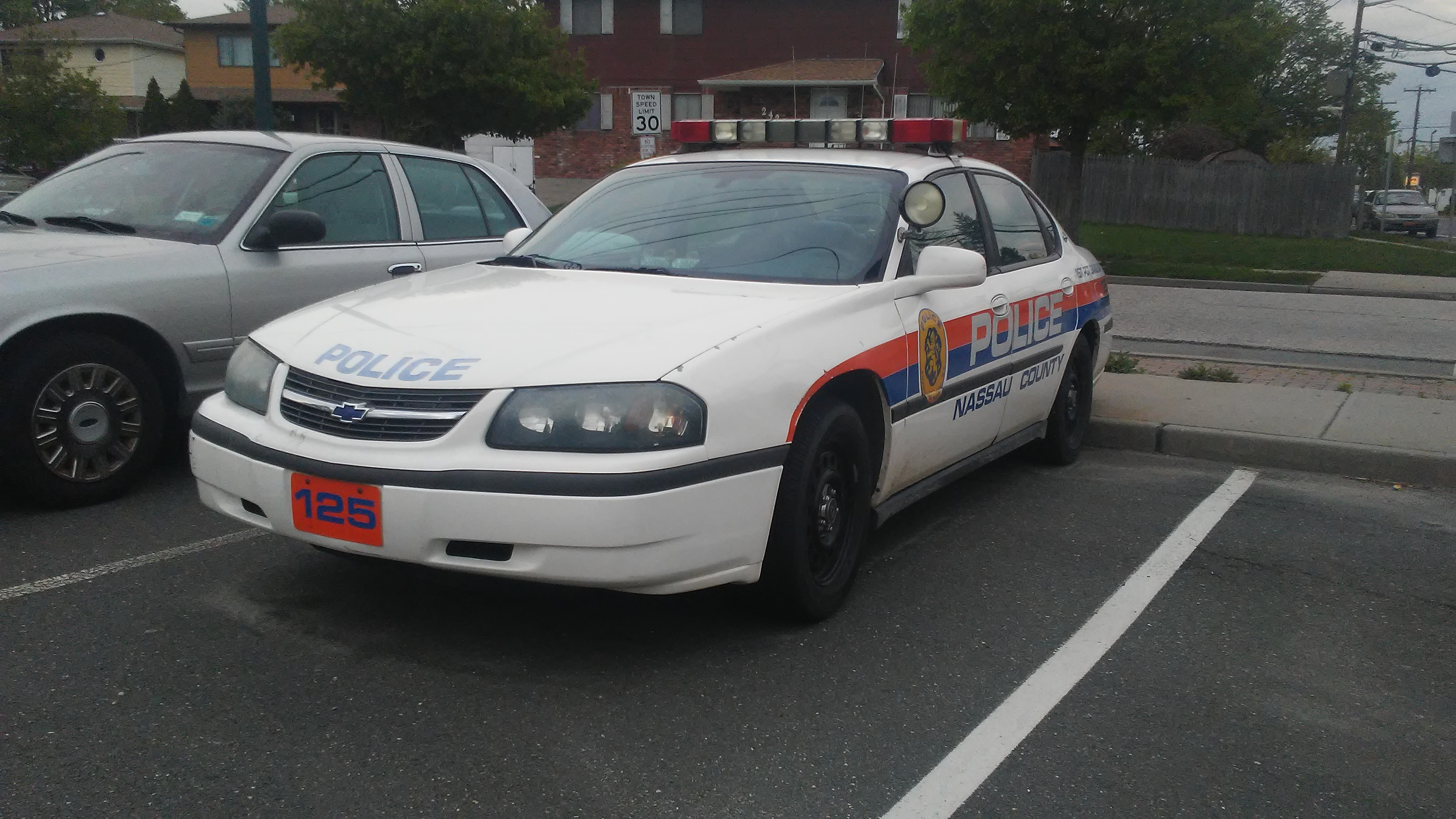
1st Precinct Gang Unit Chevrolet Impala 9C1

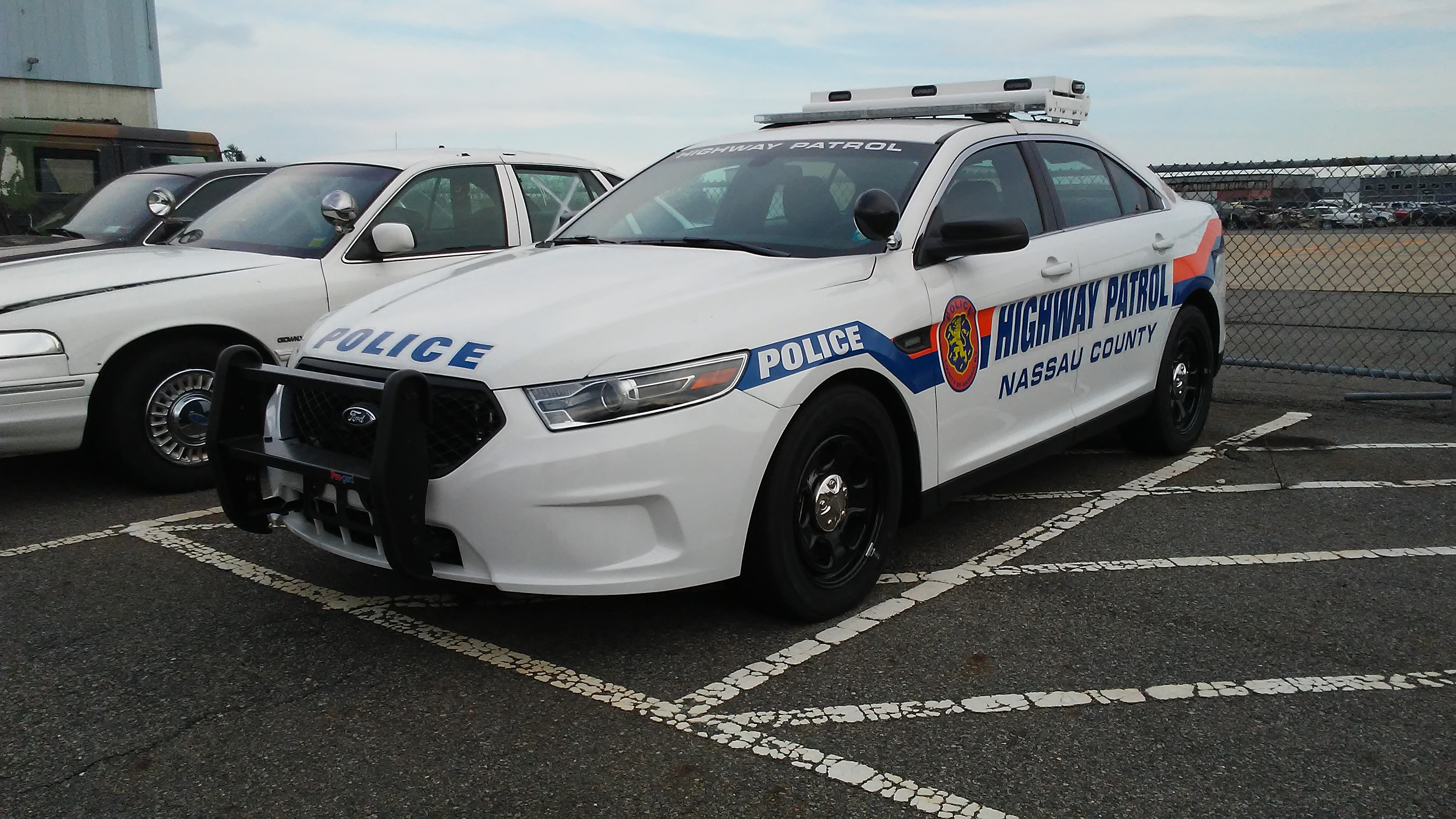
Nassau County Highway Patrol Ford Police Interceptor

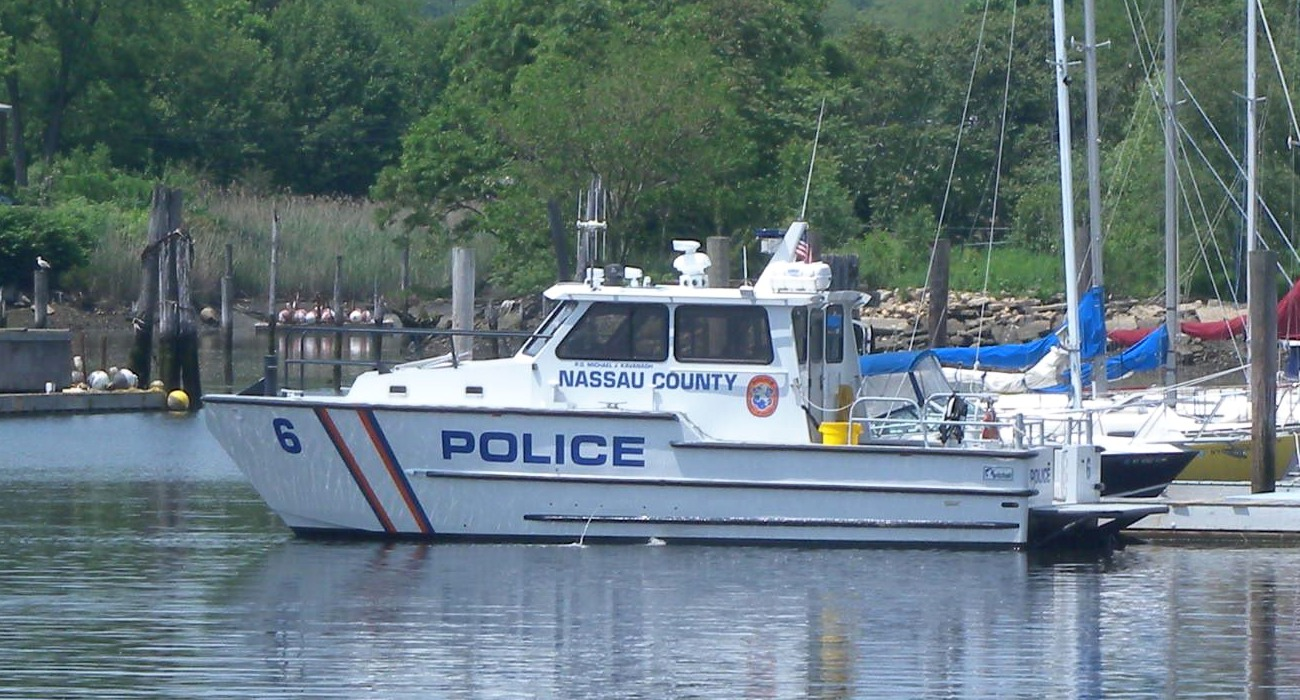
Patrol boat in Port Washington

== Recruitment ==
The Nassau County Police Department (NCPD) recruits candidates for Law Enforcement positions by administering the Nassau County Civil Service application for the position of Police Officer. Candidates will then be required to pass a written examination prior to beginning the hiring process.

It also serves as the hiring authority for law enforcement positions in certain villages and special districts within Nassau County that have their own independent police forces, which are:

1. Brookville
2. Centre Island
3. Floral Park
4. Freeport
5. Great Neck Estates
6. Garden City
7. Hempstead
8. Kensington
9. Kings Point
10. Lake Success
11. Lynbrook
12. Malverne
13. Muttontown-Upper Brookville
14. Old Brookville
15. Old Westbury
16. Oyster Bay Cove
17. Port Washington
18. Rockville Centre
19. Sands Point

Applicants must successfully complete the hiring process with the NCPD in order to be appointed. Preference is usually granted to town or village residents. If there are more positions to be filled than eligible residents, non-residents will then be considered. (Though many jurisdictions require successful applicants to become residents once they are hired.) Applicants with no prior law enforcement experience in New York State commence training at the Nassau County Police Academy, alongside recruits for the NCPD and other county agencies. Some jurisdictions exempt applicants with prior service as police officers in New York State from attending academy training.

The cities of Glen Cove and Long Beach conduct a separate testing and hiring process, though they also send their candidates to the Nassau County Police Academy.

== Rank structure ==
Promotion to the ranks of sergeant, lieutenant, and captain are made via competitive civil service examinations. Promotion to the ranks of detective, detective sergeant, detective lieutenant, detective captain, deputy inspector, inspector and chief are made at the discretion of the police commissioner, though an individual must already have attained the rank of sergeant, lieutenant or captain prior to being designated detective in that grade.

Title	Insignia	Duties / Requirements
Police Commissioner		Civilian head of department
Chief of Department		Highest-ranking sworn officer
Chief of Division		Commands a division
Assistant Chief		Second-in-Command of a Division
Deputy Chief		Commands a Bureau
Inspector		Precinct commander
Deputy Inspector		Second-in-Command of a Precinct
Detective Captain or Captain		Shift commander
Detective Lieutenant or Lieutenant		Shift supervisor
Detective Sergeant or Sergeant		Field supervisor
Detective or Police Officer		

== Other staff ==
The Nassau County Police Department also employs School Crossing Guards, Communication/911 operators, Police Service Aides, Clerk/Typists, Mechanics and Public Safety Officers.

=== Auxiliary Police ===
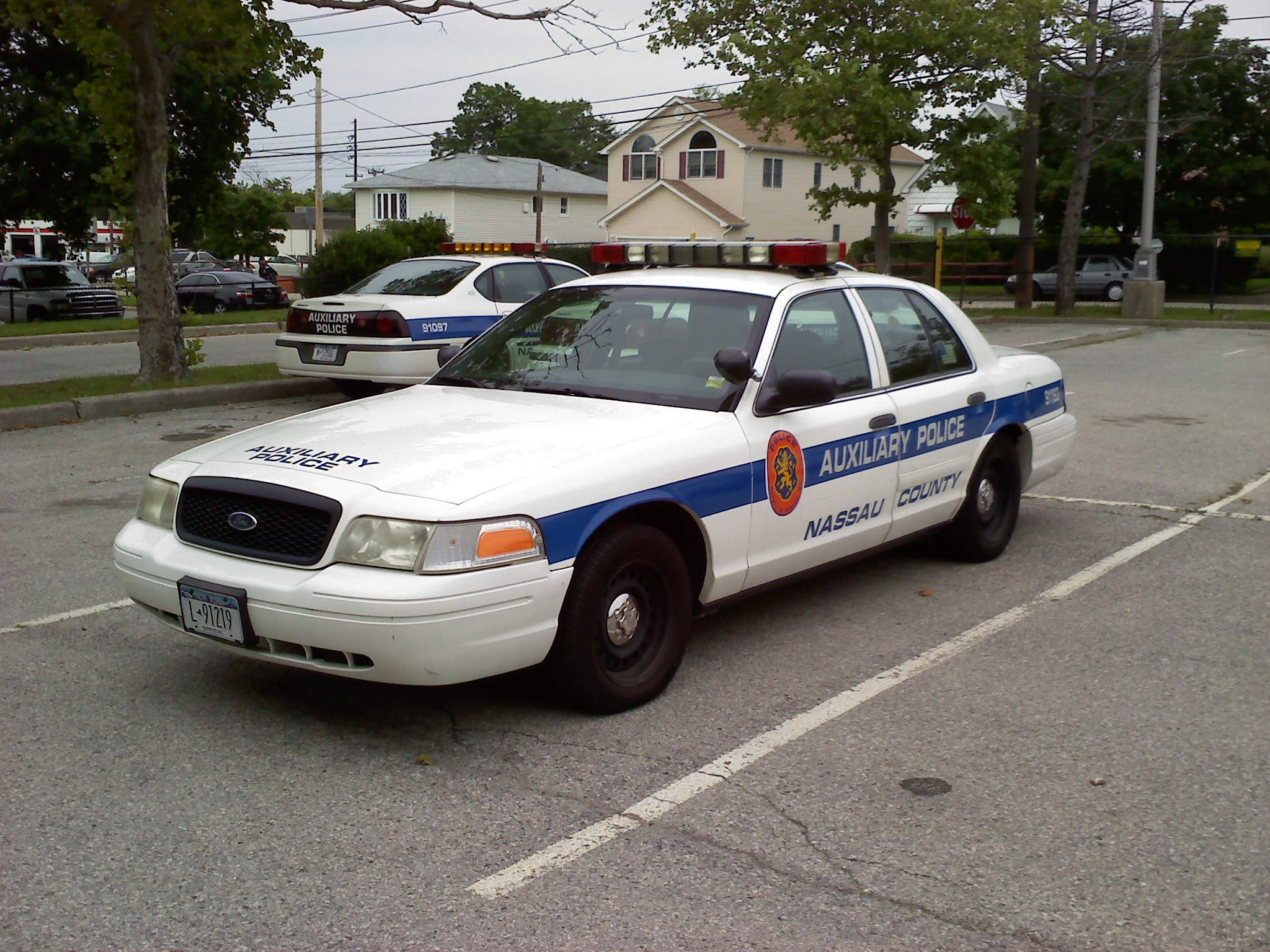
A Ford Crown Victoria Police Interceptor model Nassau County Auxiliary Police marked patrol vehicle parked at the 4th Precinct. The majority of Auxiliary Police cars are retired marked NCPD cars.

The Nassau County Auxiliary Police is a unit of the Nassau County Police Department. These volunteer police officers are assigned to 1 of 36 local community units and perform routine patrols of the neighborhood and provide traffic control for local parades, races, other community events and assist the Police Department as needed. Auxiliary Police officers are empowered to make arrests for crimes that occur in their presence.

Nassau County Auxiliary Police officers must attend and complete a 130-hour, 36-session training course, which is taught by state-certified instructors at the Nassau County Police Academy. Emergency Medical Technician (EMT) training is also available to all officers after certain criteria are met. Basic academy training includes: peace officer powers, New York State Penal Law, hazardous materials awareness, baton training, blood-borne pathogens, basic first aid/CPR, traffic and pedestrian control, and response to critical incidents.

Auxiliary Police officers are certified by the NYS Division of Criminal Justice Services (DCJS) as "Peace Officers" and are registered in the NYS DCJS registry of peace officers.

=== Emergency Ambulance Bureau ===
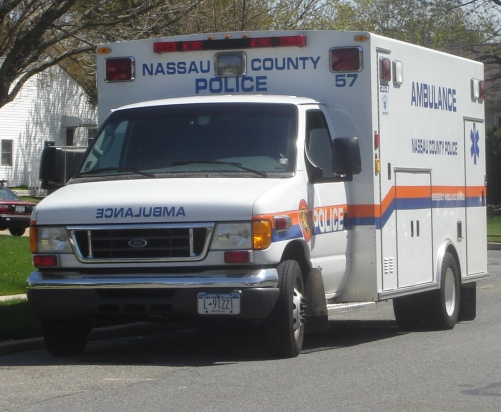
NCPD 7th Precinct Ambulance 2357

In addition to police officers, the department also employs hundreds of civilian Police Medics (PMs) who consist of Critical Care Emergency Medical Technicians (EMT-CCs) and Paramedics. The title “police medic“ is the most recent title given to these employees, who were previously known as “Ambulance medical technicians“ (AMT's).

Unlike most jurisdictions, where emergency medical response and ambulance transport are functions performed primarily by a fire department or other organizations, in Nassau County, the police department and local volunteer fire departments share this responsibility. Nassau is one of the few police agencies in New York State that trains all of its police officers to provide emergency medical services to assist the Police Medics. Nassau Police ambulances are operated by gray and blue uniformed Police Medics rather than police officers.

While Police Medics are civilian employees of the police department, they do have additional equipment and powers when compared to other paramedics. Most Police Medics carry handcuffs and pepper spray, and all Police Medics are issued bulletproof vests. Unlike other paramedics, Police Medics are often placed directly into police situations, including many violent situations that most paramedics would stage away from until the scene was secure. The volunteer fire departments and private ambulance companies who work public 911 contracts in Nassau rely on the Police Medics to handle all violent patients, including psychiatric patients, criminals who require medical treatment, prisoners in need of medical treatment (from the county holding cells or the county jail), and others. Unlike its neighboring municipalities, all psychiatric patients in Nassau go to the hospital by ambulance, due to the county having Police Medics on duty 24/7. In Suffolk or NYC, more violent or dangerous patients would often be taken by police cars instead.

The department operates 18-26 Demers Type I and Braun Type-III modular-style ambulances on any given day, each designated a four digit unit number of the pattern 23xx. For frontline ambulances, the final number matches the precinct the ambulance is assigned to. For example, an ambulance assigned to the fourth precinct would follow this model: 23x4. The third number is chosen at the discretion of headquarters and can be any single digit number, so long as an ambulance with that designation is not already in service. Spare ambulances do not follow this system. All ambulances are advanced life support ambulances and carry heart monitors, defibrillators, oxygen, trauma dressings, intubation kits, IV and IO needles and tubing, Advanced Life Support medications and other vital medical equipment. In mid 2019, NCPD deployed automated CPR devices (specifically the brand "LifeArm") to all its ambulances. These had previously been limited to supervisors vehicles only, due to the expense. However given that police medics ride solo, the dangers CPR poses to an EMS provider while an ambulance is moving, and the effectiveness of automated CPR, the county decided to use asset forfeiture funds to purchase enough additional devices so that all its ambulances could have one. As of October 2019 the deployment of these devices was reported to be complete.

The NCPD Emergency Ambulance Bureau consists of five ranks: Police Medic, Police Medic Supervisor, Police Medic Coordinator, Assistant Bureau director, and Bureau director. As Police Medics are civilian members of the department, they have no rank equivalency to sworn members of the Force (Police Officers), however the lowest rank ever allowed to oversee the bureau was a Deputy Inspector, and in more recent times the bureau was overseen by a full Inspector. At the present time, the bureau is overseen by the chiefs within the patrol division and is considered a part of the patrol division. The Bureau director of the Emergency Ambulance Bureau has been described in the past to function similarly to an inspector or even a deputy chief.

The NCPD Emergency Ambulance Bureau covers over 60,000 calls per year with 22 units operating.

A small number of EAB personnel are designated "Tactical Medics", specially trained and equipped to operate with the NCPD's Bureau of Special Operations to rescue wounded officers and civilians under fire.

After finding the abandoned bodies of a number of newborn children, Nassau AMT Timothy Jaccard and several of his colleagues in the Emergency Ambulance Bureau founded the AMT Children of Hope Foundation, to give these children proper funerals and dignified burials.

== Personnel issues ==
Nassau officers (along with their counterparts in the Suffolk County Police Department), have long been known for having among the highest police pay and benefit packages in the nation, especially when compared with the New York Police Department. In December 2022, County officials and the union representing Nassau Police officers agreed on an 8 1/2-year contract, which would run retroactively from Jan. 1, 2018 until July 1, 2026, and increase the top base pay for officers from $122,000 to $141,000 (excluding overtime, night differential, longevity pay, $3,000 per officer for wearing body cams and other benefits). Starting pay for new officers would also be increased from $35,000 to $37,333.

Many New York City police officers apply for positions in the Nassau force because of this disparity. Failure rates of NYPD officers in the Nassau Police Academy are about the same as non-police officer candidates. Typically, between one-third and one-half of the recruits in every Nassau police academy class are former city officers. A police exam took place in January 2018 and a large class of 185 recruits (including 50 former NYPD officers) entered the police academy in December 2020.

Police pay has been a contentious issue in the county for many years. In 2000, the state formed a financial oversight authority to monitor the county's budget. On January 27, 2011, after several public warnings, the authority moved to take control of the county's finances. In the years following the takeover, budgetary issues curtailed hiring severely. On May 17, 2013, a class of only 37 recruits was sworn into the police academy, the first class since 48 entered in 2004 and 50 recruits in 2008.

Hiring on the Nassau force has long been a bone of contention, with African Americans, Hispanics and other groups, often supported by the U.S. Justice Department, claiming the hiring process is biased toward white males. The county has denied any intentional discrimination, and there have been repeated recruiting drives aimed at convincing more minorities to take the police exam, which itself has been repeatedly redesigned with the aim of making it easier. White candidates have disputed this, claiming the test is now biased against them. These controversies have led to numerous lawsuits, which have repeatedly delayed hiring and account in part for the force's shrinking size.

Another major point of contention between the county government and the police union in recent years has been inadequate police academy training facilities. After being located for several years in a converted elementary school in Williston Park, the academy facilities were "temporarily" relocated for a decade in trailers on the grounds of the county jail in East Meadow. In May 2006, the Suozzi administration announced the academy would move into yet another converted school, this one in Massapequa. A purpose-built police academy, located on the campus of Nassau County Community College in Uniondale, opened in 2021.

Nassau County Executive Bruce Blakeman – upon taking office in 2022 – started a hiring program to increase the ranks of Nassau County Police in direct opposition to the defund the police movement. He hired 100 additional police officers in just his first 18 months in office.

== Notable cases ==
The Nassau County Police investigated the hunt for The Honeymoon Killers Raymond Fernandez and Martha Beck in the late 1940s, the Weinberger kidnapping of 1956 (on which the 2002 Robert De Niro film City by the Sea was very loosely based), the 1974 kidnapping of Jack Teich, the 1986 murder of yeshiva student Chaim Weiss, the crash of Avianca Flight 52 in Cove Neck in 1990, the Joey Buttafuoco/Amy Fisher imbroglio, and the shootings committed aboard a Long Island Rail Road commuter train by Colin Ferguson in 1993. Among the NCPD's few large-scale, high-profile security events have been the 1998 Goodwill Games, which took place largely in Nassau County, and the third 2008 presidential debate, which took place at Hofstra University in Hempstead. Nassau officers also participated in the recovery effort at the World Trade Center site in September 2001.

== Fallen officers ==
In the history of the Nassau County Police Department, 49 police officers have died while on duty.

== In popular culture ==
- The short-lived CBS sitcom Kevin Can Wait told the story of Kevin Gable, a retired Nassau County cop living in Massapequa, who later started a private security company.
- The 1985 film Compromising Positions, starring Susan Sarandon, Raul Julia, and Edward Herrmann, features the NCPD.
- Nassau County Police were featured in the 2013 film The Wolf of Wall Street, starring Leonardo DiCaprio, which takes place in the prosperous neighborhood of Old Westbury.
- Nassau County Police are frequently featured in books by novelist Nelson DeMille, such as his bestseller, Gold Coast.

== See also ==
- List of law enforcement agencies in New York
- List of law enforcement agencies on Long Island
- Nassau County Sheriff's Department
