= Keechant Sewell =

American police officer

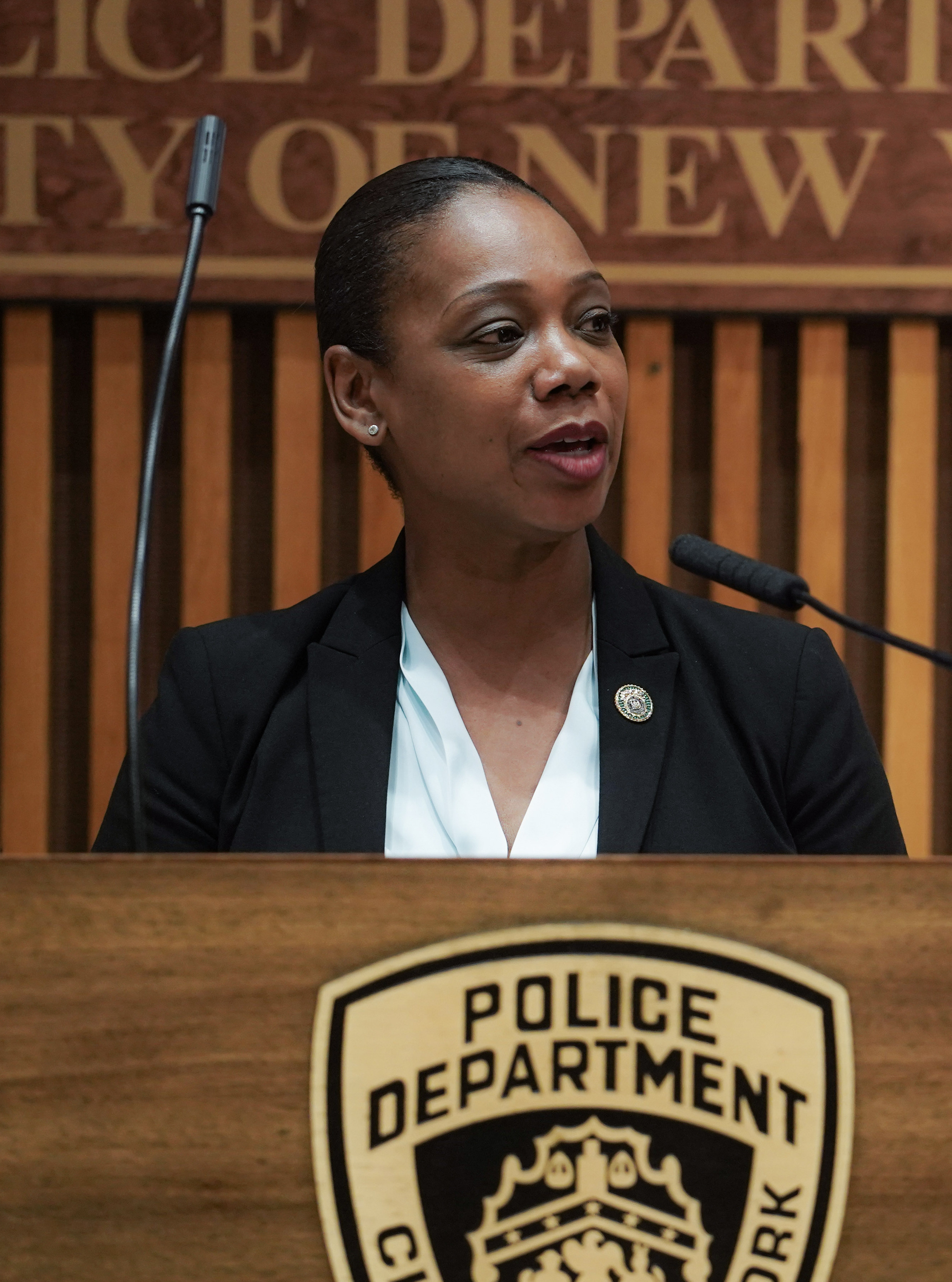
- Sewell in 2022

45th New York City Police Commissioner
- In office January 1, 2022 – June 30, 2023
- Appointed by: Eric Adams
- Preceded by: Dermot Shea
- Succeeded by: Edward Caban

Chief of Detectives of the Nassau County Police Department
- In office September 24, 2020 – December 31, 2021
- Commissioner: Patrick Ryder
- Succeeded by: Christopher Ferro

Personal details
- Born: April 2, 1972 (age 54) New York City, U.S.

Keechant L. Sewell (born April 2, 1972) is an American baseball executive, former police officer and administrator. Sewell is currently the New York Mets Senior Vice President of Security and Guest Experience. She previously served as the 45th New York City Police Commissioner, the first woman and third black person to serve in the position. On June 12, 2023, Sewell announced that she was stepping down as commissioner. No reason was given for her departure.

== Early life ==
Sewell was raised in the Queens neighborhood of Long Island City, including at the Queensbridge Houses. She later lived in the Queens neighborhoods of Corona and Jamaica.

== Career ==
=== Nassau County Police Department ===
In October 1997, Sewell became a police officer assigned to Nassau County Police Department's Fifth Precinct. Sewell was eventually promoted through the ranks to become the commanding officer of the 7th Precinct and then, by 2016, commanding officer of the major case squad. In 2008 Sewell had attended the FBI National Academy, and other assignments included the Professional Standards Bureau, Internal Affairs, and training with the FBI to be the county's chief hostage negotiator. On September 24, 2020, Sewell was promoted to NCPD's chief of detectives, commanding a staff of approximately 350 officers.

Sewell was also a member of the New York–New Jersey Joint-Terrorism Task Force.

=== New York City Police Commissioner ===
On December 14, 2021, it was announced that Sewell would be appointed as the 45th New York City police commissioner by Mayor-Elect Eric Adams. She became the first female commissioner of the New York Police Department, and its third black commissioner. She oversaw 35,000 uniformed officers and 18,000 civilians. On January 1, 2022, Sewell was officially sworn in as commissioner of the New York Police Department. Sewell was criticized for publicly accepting the appointment in front of a mural of Assata Shakur, convicted of killing a police officer.

Sometime during late May 2023, the Police Commissioner and other members of the Adams administration devised a plan using a web portal to seek the public's input on solving cold cases in which gay men were victimized.

On June 12, 2023, Sewell resigned as Commissioner of the NYPD. While no official reason was given for her resignation, The New York Times reported that she felt frustrated and undermined by City Hall, noting that the Adams administration required its approval for police promotions and handpicked the first deputy commissioner and chief of department.

Adams in a statement said, "I want to thank Police Commissioner Sewell for her devotion over the last 18 months and her steadfast leadership. Her efforts played a leading role in this administration's tireless work to make New York City safer. When we came into office, crime was trending upwards, and thanks to the brave men and women of the NYPD, most of the major crime categories are now down. The commissioner worked nearly 24 hours a day, seven days a week for a year and a half, and we are all grateful for her service. New Yorkers owe her a debt of gratitude."

PBA President Pat Lynch stated that Sewell, "took over a police department in crisis and faced tremendous challenges from day one. She cared about the cops on the street and was always open to working with us to improve their lives and working conditions. There are still enormous challenges facing the NYPD. Her leadership will be sorely missed."

Sewell was replaced by Edward Caban, who was hand-picked by Mayor Adams to be the first deputy commissioner under Sewell.

== Personal life ==
At the time of her appointment as New York City Police Commissioner, Sewell was residing in Valley Stream, New York.

Police appointments
Preceded by Dermot Shea	New York City Police Commissioner; January 1, 2022–June 30, 2023	Succeeded by Edward Caban
