= Edward Caban =

American police commissioner (born 1967)

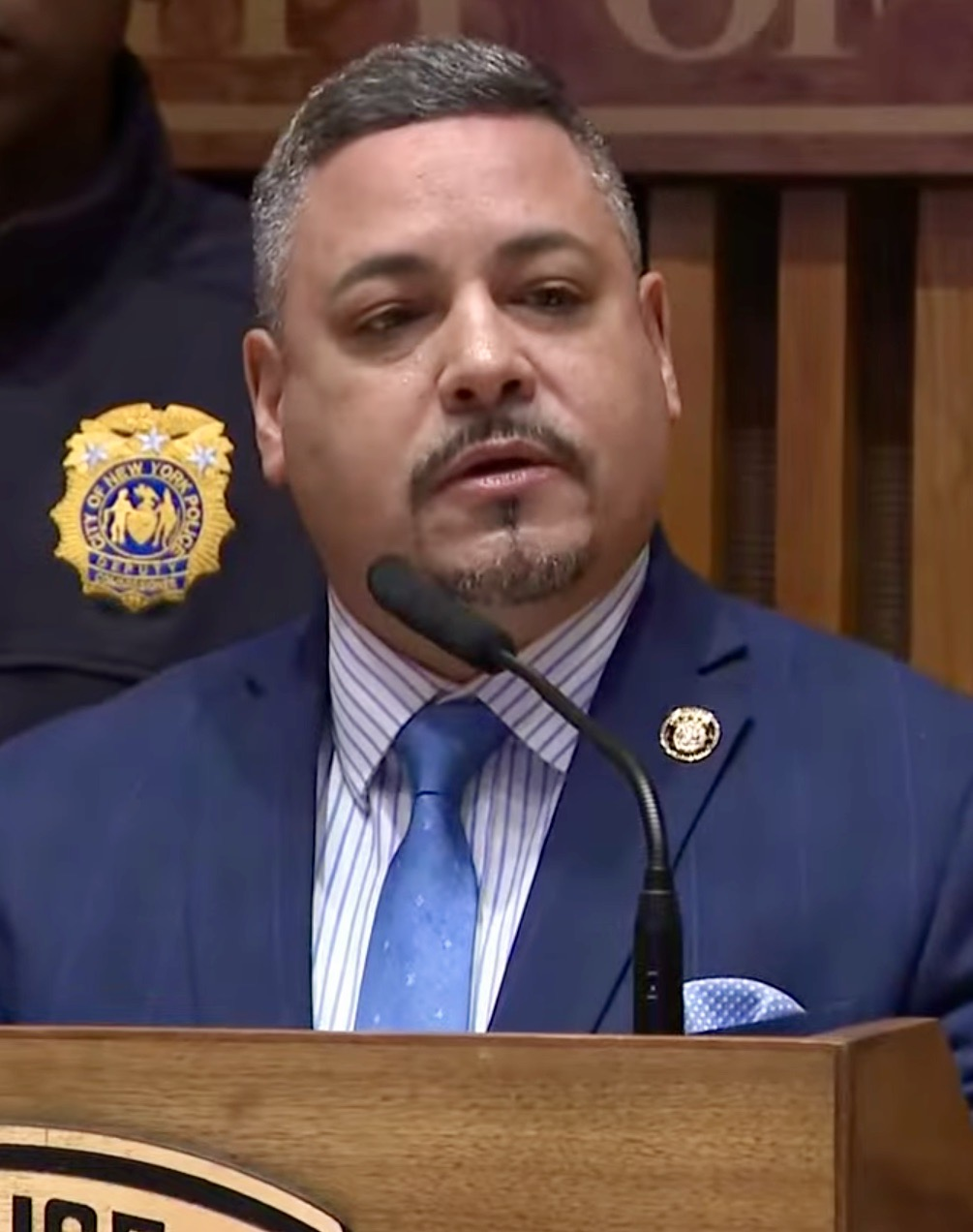
- Caban in 2024

46th New York City Police Commissioner
- In office Acting: July 1, 2023 – July 17, 2023; July 17, 2023 – September 13, 2024
- Appointed by: Eric Adams
- Preceded by: Keechant Sewell
- Succeeded by: Tom Donlon

First Deputy New York City Police Commissioner
- In office January 4, 2022 – July 17, 2023
- Commissioner: Keechant Sewell
- Preceded by: Benjamin Tucker
- Succeeded by: Tania Kinsella

Personal details
- Born: Edward A. Caban; September 8, 1967 (age 59) The Bronx, New York City, U.S.
- Education: St. John’s University (BS)

Edward A. Caban (born September 8, 1967) is an American police officer who served as the New York City Police Commissioner from 2023 to 2024, having been appointed by Mayor Eric Adams, and resigning amidst federal corruption investigations into the Eric Adams administration. He was the first Latino to serve as Commissioner of the NYPD.

During his brief tenure as commissioner, Caban watered down the NYPD's misconduct rules for officers, reducing penalties for officers who commit various offenses. He also vetoed more disciplinary penalties in plea deals between the New York City Civilian Complaint Review Board and police officers accused of misconduct than all New York City commissioners had in the previous 10 years combined.

Caban previously served as First Deputy Police Commissioner under Keechant Sewell.

== Early life ==
Caban was born and raised in the Bronx to a family of Puerto Rican descent. He graduated from Cardinal Hayes High School in 1985. In 1989, he graduated with a BS in Criminal Justice from St. John's University. In 1991, he joined the NYPD. Three years later, he was made Sergeant, then Inspector. Most recently, he was the adjutant in Brooklyn North patrol. His father, Juan, was a New York City Transit Police Detective who also served as the President of the Transit Police Hispanic Society. His twin, James Caban also served in the NYPD.

== Career ==
During his 30 years at the NYPD, Caban was found by the New York City Civilian Complaint Review Board to have engaged in misconduct twice. In one of the cases, he arrested a civilian for not providing identification and was ordered to complete more training. In the second case, he refused to provide names of officers to a civilian when she claimed they had mistreated her; as a result, an admonition was added to his personnel file. In 2010, he was disciplined for "unauthorized personal use of a department vehicle" and for "transporting an unauthorized person in that vehicle." He was docked 20 vacation days and paid $428 in restitution.

=== New York City Police Commissioner ===
On June 12, 2023, it was announced that Caban would fill in as acting NYPD commissioner after Keechant Sewell departed. On July 17, he was formally appointed as NYPD commissioner.

==== Overseeing discipline for officers ====
In his nine months in office, Caban eliminated more disciplinary penalties in plea deals between the New York City Civilian Complaint Review Board and police officers accused of misconduct than all New York City commissioners had in the previous 10 years combined.

In June 2024, ProPublica revealed that, during his first year in office, Caban had used his authority of retention to "retain," or prevent from going to trial, the disciplinary cases of 54 officers before the New York City Civilian Complaint Review Board, including exercising this authority in more than 30 cases where department lawyers and the officers involved had already agreed to disciplinary action.

In September 2024, Caban reduced the suggested punishments for officer misconduct in the NYPD's disciplinary guidelines. In some of these cases, the suggested punishment went from the "loss of five vacation days or a five-day suspension to merely 'additional training.'" The New York Civil Liberties Union claims that this reduction in suggested punishments for misconduct is "reinforcing the NYPD’s culture of impunity."

That same month, Caban signed off on the proposed discipline for an NYPD officer Brendan Sullivan who had "engaged in sexual misconduct," "abused his authority," and was "untruthful with investigators." The officer had left a series of harassing messages on a civilian's phone in retaliation for that civilian reporting police to New York City's 311 compliant line. Caban approved of a small fine and the loss of 60 days of leave for the officer.

==== Federal corruption investigation ====
In September 2024, the FBI raided Caban's home and seized his electronic devices in a federal corruption investigation. Caban's twin brother James also had his phone seized. The investigation into James Caban is focused on his involvement in the nightclub industry and potential monetary benefit he received from his brother's position at the NYPD. James Caban was fired from the NYPD in 2001 after wrongfully detaining and threatening a suspect.

After the raids, several area bars have claimed that Caban's twin brother told them he could resolve "problems with NYPD" over noise complaints if they paid him a $2,500 fee.

New York City Council members Robert Holden, Lincoln Restler, and Tiffany Cabán, as well as the New York Post editorial board, called for Caban to step down as NYPD Commissioner.

A week after the raids, Caban resigned, in the midst of the investigations into the Eric Adams administration, stating, "for the good of this city and this department—I have made the difficult decision to resign as Police Commissioner." Caban's lawyer issued a statement that claimed, "he is not a target of the investigation according to the U.S. attorney’s office in Manhattan." Former New York Homeland Security Director Tom Donlon was named as Caban's interim replacement.

== Personal life ==
In September 2023, Caban, along with New York City Mayor Eric Adams, became a Prince Hall Freemason as well as a 32nd Degree Member of the Scottish Rite.

Police appointments
Preceded by Keechant Sewell	New York City Police Commissioner; July 1, 2023–September 13, 2024	Succeeded by Thomas G. Donlon
