= Thomas G. Donlon =

American law enforcement officer

Thomas Donlon
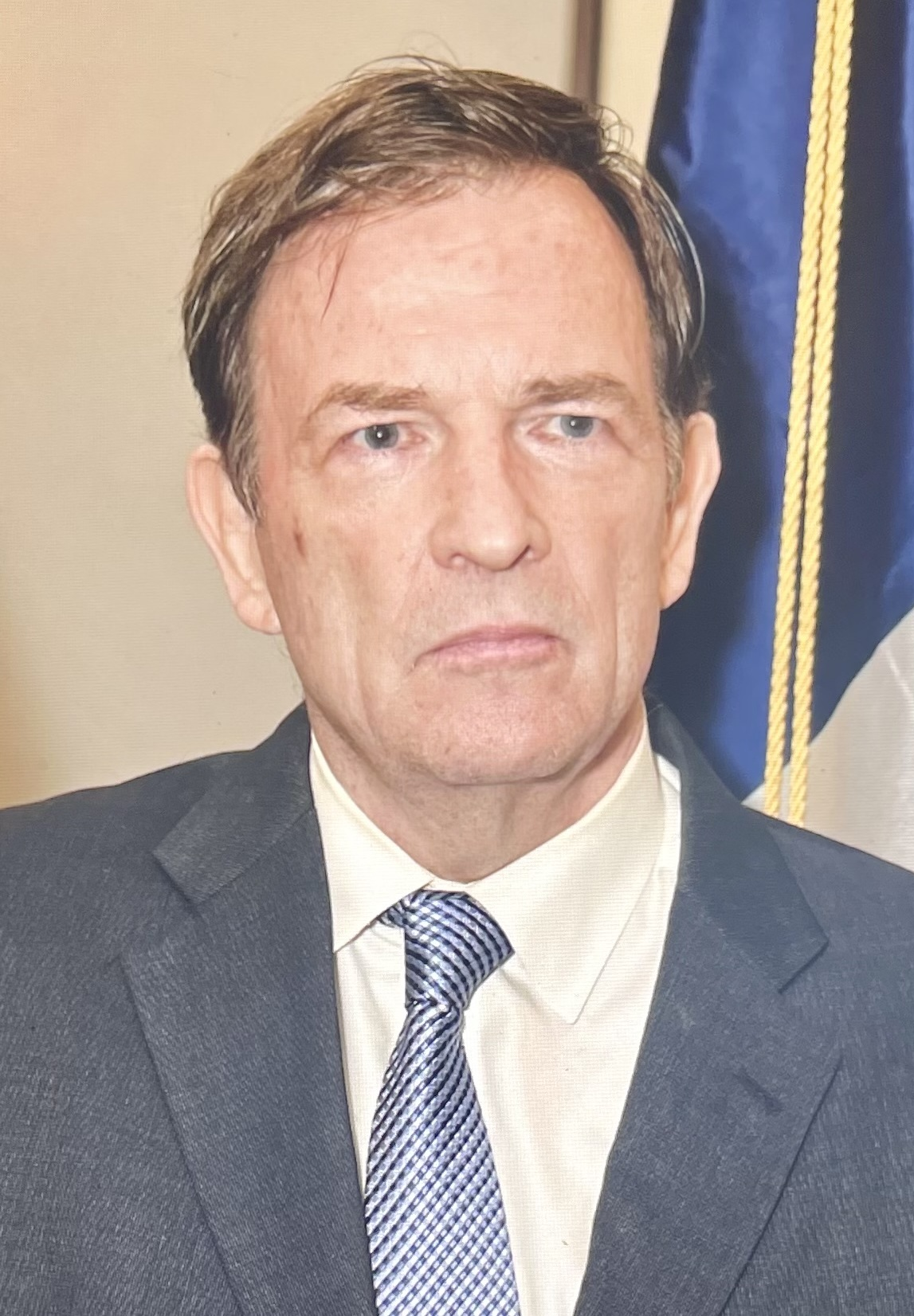
- Commissioner's swearing-in ceremony, September 13, 2024

47th New York City Police Commissioner
- In office September 13, 2024 – November 24, 2024
- Mayor: Eric Adams
- Preceded by: Edward Caban
- Succeeded by: Jessica Tisch

Personal details
- Education: Iona University (BA)

Thomas Donlon is an American law enforcement officer. From September to November 2024, Donlon, a Bronx native, served as the New York City Police Commissioner following the resignation of Edward Caban. He was the third police commissioner to serve under New York City Mayor Eric Adams.

== Early life and education ==
Growing up in the Bronx, Donlon attended Iona University in New Rochelle where he received a Bachelor of Arts degree in 1976.

== Career ==
Donlon was a special agent with the Federal Bureau of Investigation (FBI), where he was in charge of their National Threat Center. He put together the FBI's "Guardian" system, a centralized terror threat database and "managed the FBI’s Terrorism Watch List." He also ran the FBI/NYPD Joint Terrorism Task Force and served as Assistant Special Agent in charge of the FBI's New York Counter-terrorism Division. As a special agent, he was assigned to the Joint Terrorism Task Force-JTTF in the FBI's New York City office, where he was assigned to share the responsibility of investigating the 1993 World Trade Center bombing. That investigation led to five federal court convictions.

After retiring from the FBI, Donlon was a global security director at two financial corporations. Between 2009 and 2010, he served as the Director of New York's Office of Homeland Security.

In 2020, Donlon founded a security firm called Global Security Resolutions. The company produced an event series called Focus Under Pressure that featured Joe Pistone, a former FBI agent who went undercover to investigate organized crime.

=== New York City Police Commissioner ===
Donlon was sworn in as interim New York City Police Commissioner on September 13, 2024. Two months later the temporary post ended as New York City Mayor Eric Adams named Jessica Tisch the next police commissioner.

On September 20, 2024, just over a week into his tenure, several of his homes were raided by the FBI. In response to the raid, Donlon noted that the FBI "took materials that came into my possession approximately 20 years ago and are unrelated to my work with the New York City Police Department." He further noted that since the matter is not an NYPD matter, the department would not be commenting on it.

In July 2025, Donlon filed a lawsuit in which he accused Mayor Adams and numerous former and contemporaneous high-ranking police officials of running the NYPD as a corrupt enterprise, including theft, corruption, and threats of violence, and called on the FBI to take over the department's operations.

== Personal life ==
Donlon is married to Dierdre O'Connor-Donlon, a retired attorney.

Police appointments
| Preceded by Edward Caban | New York City Police Commissioner; September 13, 2024–November 24, 2024 | Succeeded by Jessica Tisch |
