= Jerry Risius =

American cinematographer and director

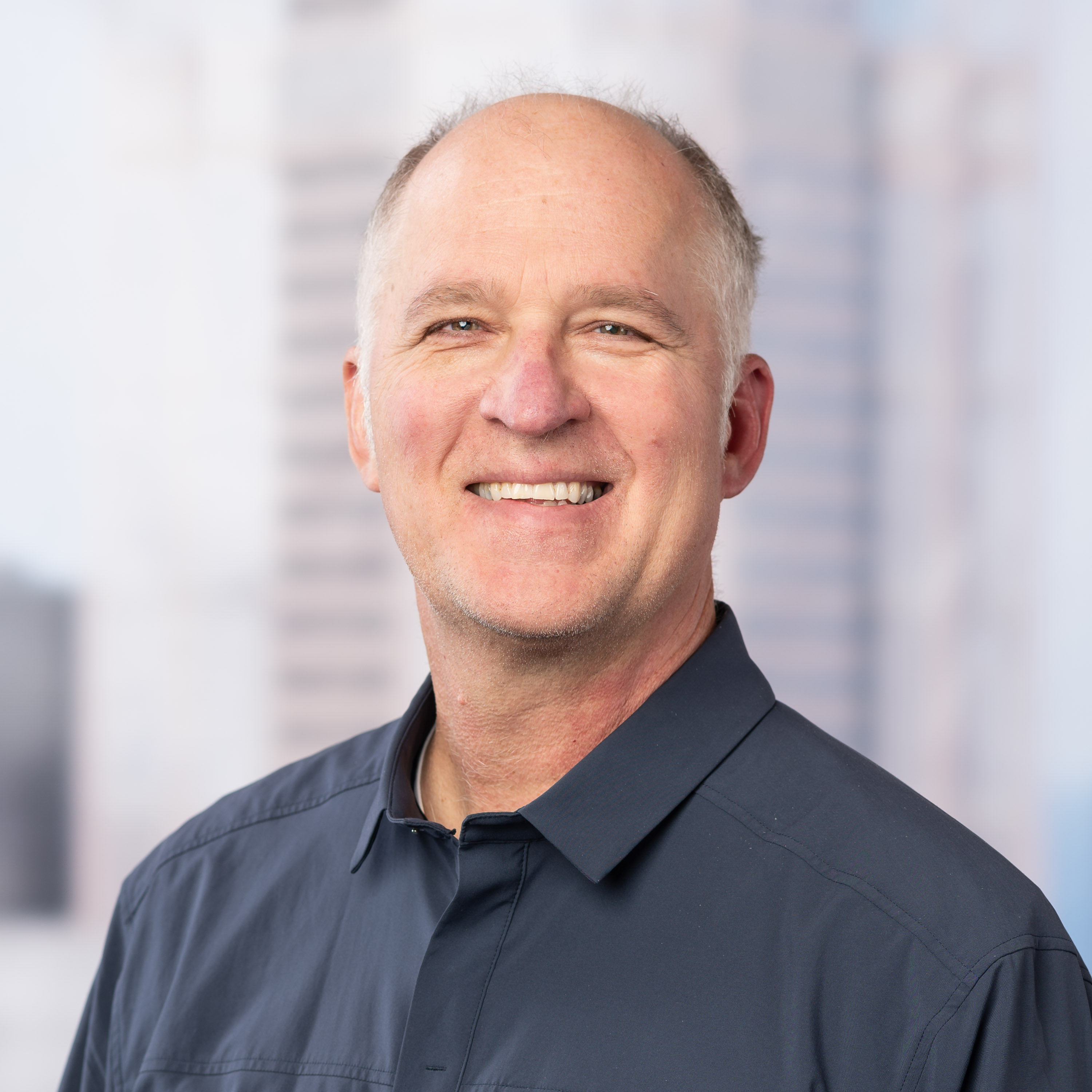
- Born: Buffalo Center, Iowa, U.S.
- Occupations: Cinematographer, director
- Years active: 1997 – Present

Jerry Risius is an American documentary film director and cinematographer. He is an Peabody Award nominee and a three-time Emmy Award nominee.

== Life and career ==
Risius was born in Buffalo Center, Iowa, and he graduated from the University of Iowa. From 2017 to 2021, he directed the independent feature documentary, Storm Lake, along with Beth Levison, which premiered at the Full Frame Documentary Film Festival, broadcast on PBS's Independent Lens in 2022, and was nominated for a Peabody Award and a 2022 News and Documentary Emmy Awards.

Risius is an Adjunct Faculty Professor for 15 years at the School of Visual Arts in New York City.

== Selected filmography ==
Year	Title	Contribution	Note
2024	Drop Dead City	Cinematographer	Documentary
2023	Food, Inc. 2	Additional cinematographer	Documentary
2022	Director by Night	Cinematographer	Documentary
2022	Gutsy	Cinematographer	3 episodes
2022	Earthstorm	Cinematography	1 episode
2021	Storm Lake	Director and cinematographer	Documentary
2020	No Small Matter	Cinematographer	Documentary
2020	Denise Ho: Becoming the Song	Cinematographer	Documentary
2019	The Kingmaker	Cinematography	Documentary
2018	Generation Wealth	Cinematographer	Documentary
2018	Seeing Allred	Cinematographer	Documentary
2016	Pickle	Cinematographer	Documentary
2014	Watchers of the Sky	Cinematographer	Documentary
2011	The Last Mountain	Cinematographer	Documentary
2007	The Devil Came on Horseback	Cinematographer and field producer	Documentary
2007	A Walk to Beautiful	Cinematographer	TV show
2005–2018	Parts Unknown and Anthony Bourdain: No Reservations	Cinematographer and director	50 episodes

== Awards and nominations ==
Year	Result	Award	Category	Work	Ref.
2021	Won	AFI Docs Festival	Audience Award	Storm Lake	
2021	Won	Woodstock Film Festival	Best Documentary Feature	Storm Lake	
2021	Nominated	News and Documentary Emmy Awards	Outstanding Business and Economic Documentary	Storm Lake	
2021	Nominated	Peabody Awards	Documentary honorees	Storm Lake	
2021	Nominated	News and Documentary Emmy Awards	Outstanding Science and Technology Documentary	Pandemic: How to Prevent an Outbreak	
2018	Nominated	Primetime Emmy Awards	Outstanding Cinematography for a Nonfiction Program	Anthony Bourdain: Parts Unknown	
2007	Nominated	News and Documentary Emmy Awards	Outstanding Informational Programming – Long Form	Anthony Bourdain: No Reservations	
