= Merchant's House Museum =

Historic house in Manhattan, New York

- Old Merchant's House (Seabury Tredwell House)
- U.S. National Register of Historic Places
- U.S. National Historic Landmark
- New York State Register of Historic Places
- New York City Landmark
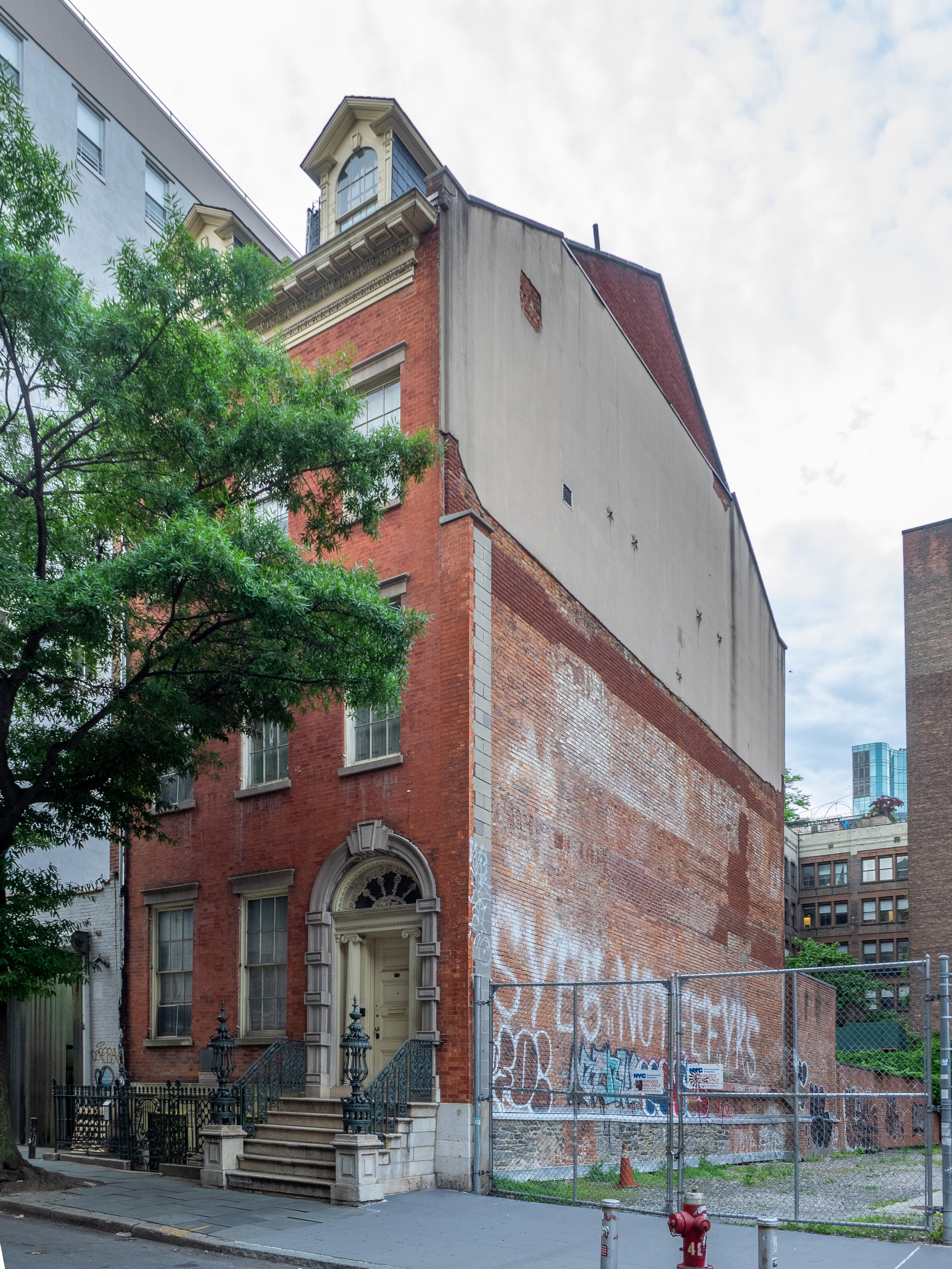
- Interactive map of Old Merchant's House (Seabury Tredwell House)
- Location: 29 East Fourth Street, Manhattan, New York, U.S.
- Coordinates: 40°43′39.6″N 73°59′32.5″W
- Built: 1832
- Architectural style: Federal-style (exterior); Greek revival (interior)
- Website: merchantshouse.org
- NRHP reference No.: 66000548
- NYSRHP No.: 06101.000054
- NYCL No.: 0006, 1244

Significant dates
- Added to NRHP: October 15, 1966
- Designated NHL: June 23, 1965
- Designated NYSRHP: June 23, 1980
- Designated NYCL: October 14, 1965 (exterior); December 22, 1981 (interior)

The Merchant's House Museum, also known as the Old Merchant's House and the Seabury Tredwell House, is a historic house museum at 29 East Fourth Street in the NoHo neighborhood of Manhattan in New York City. Built by the hatter Joseph Brewster in 1831 and 1832, the edifice is a four-story building with a Federal-style brick facade and a Greek Revival interior. It was the Tredwell family's residence for almost a century before becoming a museum in 1936. The Merchant's House Museum is the only 19th-century residence in Manhattan with its original exterior and interior intact.

Brewster built the house as a speculative development, selling it in 1835 to the merchant Seabury Tredwell, who lived there with his family and servants. The structure remained in the family until the death of the youngest child, Gertrude, in 1933. George Chapman, a distant relative, purchased the building and transformed it into a museum. Over the next three decades, the museum's operators struggled to obtain funds to restore the deteriorating house. The architect Joseph Roberto completely renovated the building from 1970 to 1980, and the museum underwent further restoration in the early 1990s after the demolition of nearby buildings damaged it. During the 2010s and 2020s, museum officials protested the construction of a nearby hotel because of concerns that the project would further damage the house.

The Merchant's House Museum has a raised basement, a front doorway accessed by a stoop, a slate roof, and a rear garden. The interior consists of a family room and kitchen in the basement; two parlors on the first floor; and bedrooms on the upper floors. There is also a secret passageway that was used to shelter fugitive slaves as part of the Underground Railroad. The museum's collection has over 4,500 items owned by the Tredwell family, including pieces of furniture, clothing, household items, and personal items. The museum also hosts various performances and events, and it operates tours and educational programs. Reviewers have praised both the museum's exhibits and the architecture. The building's facade and interior are New York City designated landmarks, and the building is a National Historic Landmark.

== Site ==
The Merchant's House Museum, originally the Seabury Tredwell House, is at 29 East Fourth Street in the NoHo neighborhood of Manhattan in New York City. It is on the north side of Fourth Street, between Lafayette Street to the west and Bowery to the east. The land lot is rectangular and measures 3,072 square feet (285 m^{2}), with a frontage of 24.25 feet (7.39 m); the lot extends 128.83 feet (39.27 m) back from the street. The current museum was built as one of six identical houses on the same block.

Abutting the museum to the east is a public park named Manuel Plaza. Built atop a construction shaft for New York City Water Tunnel No. 3, it was named in honor of five African-born slaves who received land in the neighborhood from the Dutch West India Company. Farther east, at 37 East Fourth Street, is the Samuel Tredwell Skidmore House, a three-story Greek Revival house built for a cousin of one of 29 East Fourth Street's early residents, Seabury Tredwell. The De Vinne Press Building to the west and the Astor Library Building to the north are on the same block. Other nearby buildings include the Firehouse of Engine Company No. 33 one block south, 357 Bowery half a block east, and the Schermerhorn Building half a block west.

The site was formerly part of the estate of German-American businessman John Jacob Astor, who, in 1803, acquired land between what is now Astor Place and Great Jones Street. Astor subsequently built his mansion and horse stable directly to the west of the Seabury Tredwell House. In the 1830s, the wealthiest New Yorkers were starting to relocate northward from what is now the Financial District of Manhattan to what is now Lafayette Street in NoHo. At the time, the area surrounding Lafayette Street was still mostly undeveloped. Residential development in the area peaked at that time before moving northward again in the 1840s and 1850s.

== History ==
The house was first occupied by Seabury Tredwell, a merchant born in 1780 to a prominent Long Island family; he was a descendant of Samuel Seabury, an Episcopal bishop. Tredwell established a business on Pearl Street in Lower Manhattan around 1803 or 1804, which later became Tredwell, Kissam & Company. Tredwell married Eliza Parker in 1820, and the couple had seven children over the next fifteen years, before Tredwell retired in 1835. Although Tredwell had been a successful businessman during his career, he was not well known outside of his community.

=== Use as residence ===
==== 19th century ====
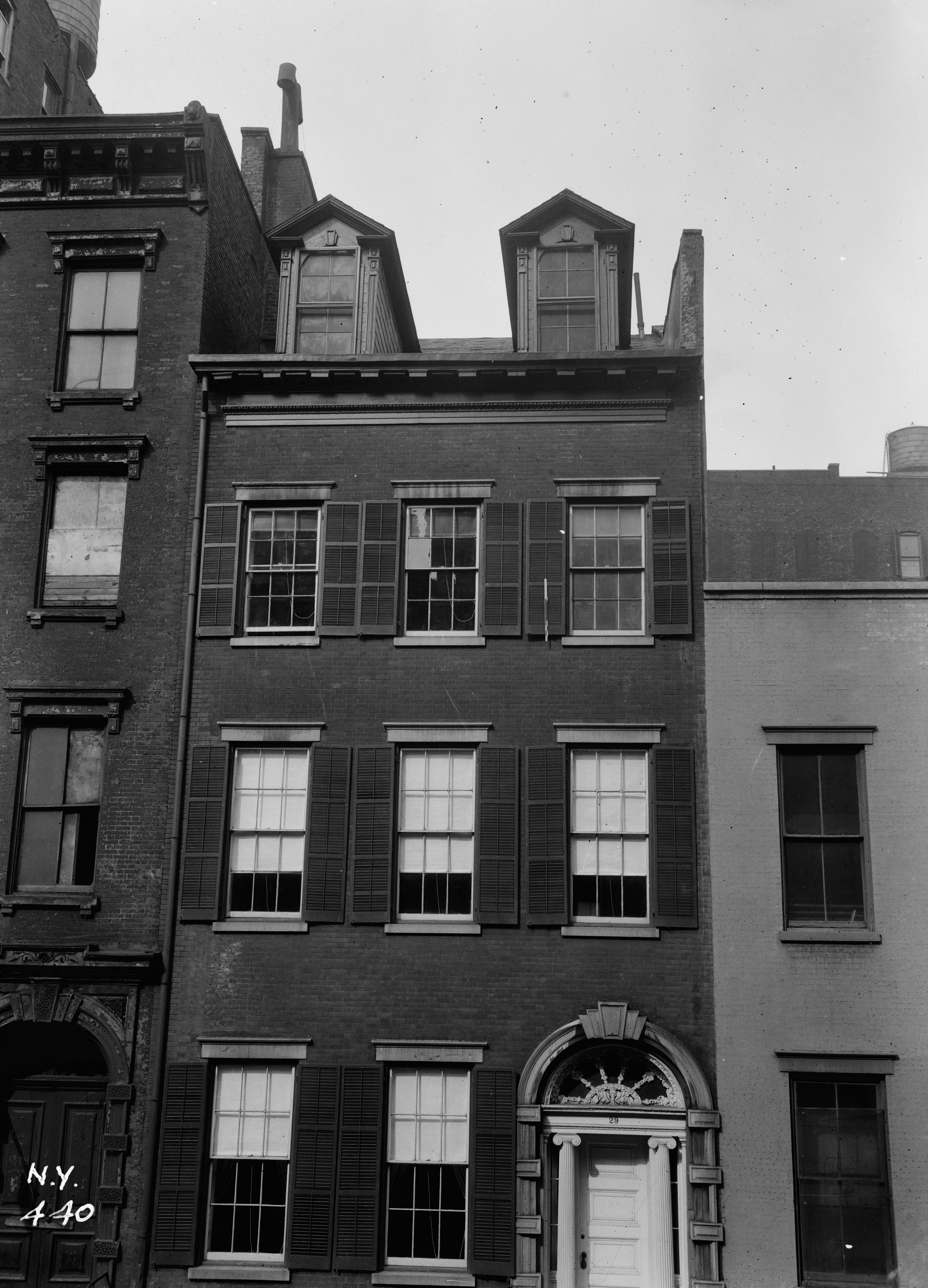
View of the exterior in 1936

Joseph Brewster, a hatter who also developed speculative real estate projects, acquired two land lots in 1831 for a combined $6,550 (equivalent to $198,000 in 2025). On one of these land lots, he built a townhouse at 29 East Fourth Street. (Note: The Wall Street Journal writes that the house on the adjacent lot was demolished in 1988; this corresponds with the demolition of the houses at 31–35 East Fourth Street.) Brewster built five additional houses on the same street. Brewster finished 29 East Fourth Street in April 1832 and lived there for three years. Brewster sold the building in 1835 to Tredwell for $18,000 (equivalent to $562,000 in 2025). It remained the Tredwell family's residence for nearly a century. They vacationed in New Jersey during the summer but lived on Fourth Street the remainder of the time, shunning publicity. Tredwell's youngest daughter, Gertrude, was born in the house in 1840. Gertrude, her two brothers, and her five sisters all lived there with their parents.

The family employed four servants at the house at any given time; almost all were Irish women, and they never worked more than a decade. Relatives of the family occasionally stayed there when they had nowhere else to go. In the 1850s—after the second-youngest daughter, Sarah, was severely injured in a stagecoach accident—a hand-pulled elevator was installed to bring Sarah to her bedroom, and the staircase to the third floor was rebuilt. The house was also one of the first in New York City to receive gas from the Consolidated Gas Company (later Consolidated Edison) in the mid-19th century. Seabury died in 1865, leaving each child $10,000 (equivalent to $210,000 in 2025). The family remodeled their house two years later.

Only three of the Tredwells' children married and moved out of the house; four daughters and one son never married. Eliza Tredwell died in 1882, followed by the siblings' unmarried brother in 1884. By then, many of their wealthy neighbors were moving away. The New York Times and the New York City Department of Parks and Recreation indicate that it was not known why the family remained, but the Toronto Star wrote that the Tredwells were too poor to move uptown. The unmarried sisters—Julia, Phebe, (Note: Phebe's name is sometimes spelled as "Phoebe".) Sarah, and Gertrude—remained in the house as spinsters. They gradually upgraded the furniture, although the sisters largely wished to retain the furnishings "as Papa wanted it". The sisters subsisted on the remnants of their father's estate, selling off land in Brooklyn and New Jersey as their savings shrank. Sarah eventually moved to the Cadillac Hotel near Times Square, where she died in 1906, leaving just Phebe, Julia, and Gertrude. According to Seabury Tredwell's great-nephew George Chapman, the family was "not a friendly lot".

==== Early 20th century ====
By 1909, the only surviving sister, Gertrude, had reportedly become a recluse, hiring a maid who greeted the few visitors that she received. In her final two decades, Gertrude increasingly stayed in her second-floor bedroom because of her declining health, and one of her nephews moved onto the third floor. They mostly stayed in the house, going to Lake Champlain for a few weeks every year. Burdened with financial hardship, Gertrude was forced to sell her belongings and take out a mortgage on her home. Nonetheless, she preserved the building in its original condition, long after all the neighboring private homes had been demolished or converted to other uses.

Electricity, running water, and a furnace were installed around 1930. After her nephew died that year, Gertrude seldom had visitors, and she died alone in one of the second-floor bedrooms in 1933. A New York Times reporter wrote that Gertrude had died as "a gentle, well-bred [recluse] hemmed in by ugliness—and she had been forgotten." The building was unoccupied for the next several years. Although Gertrude had been poor at the time of her death, the house still retained many of the family's possessions. Visitors claimed that the structure was haunted by Gertrude's ghost, a legend that persisted in the late 20th century.

=== Use as museum ===
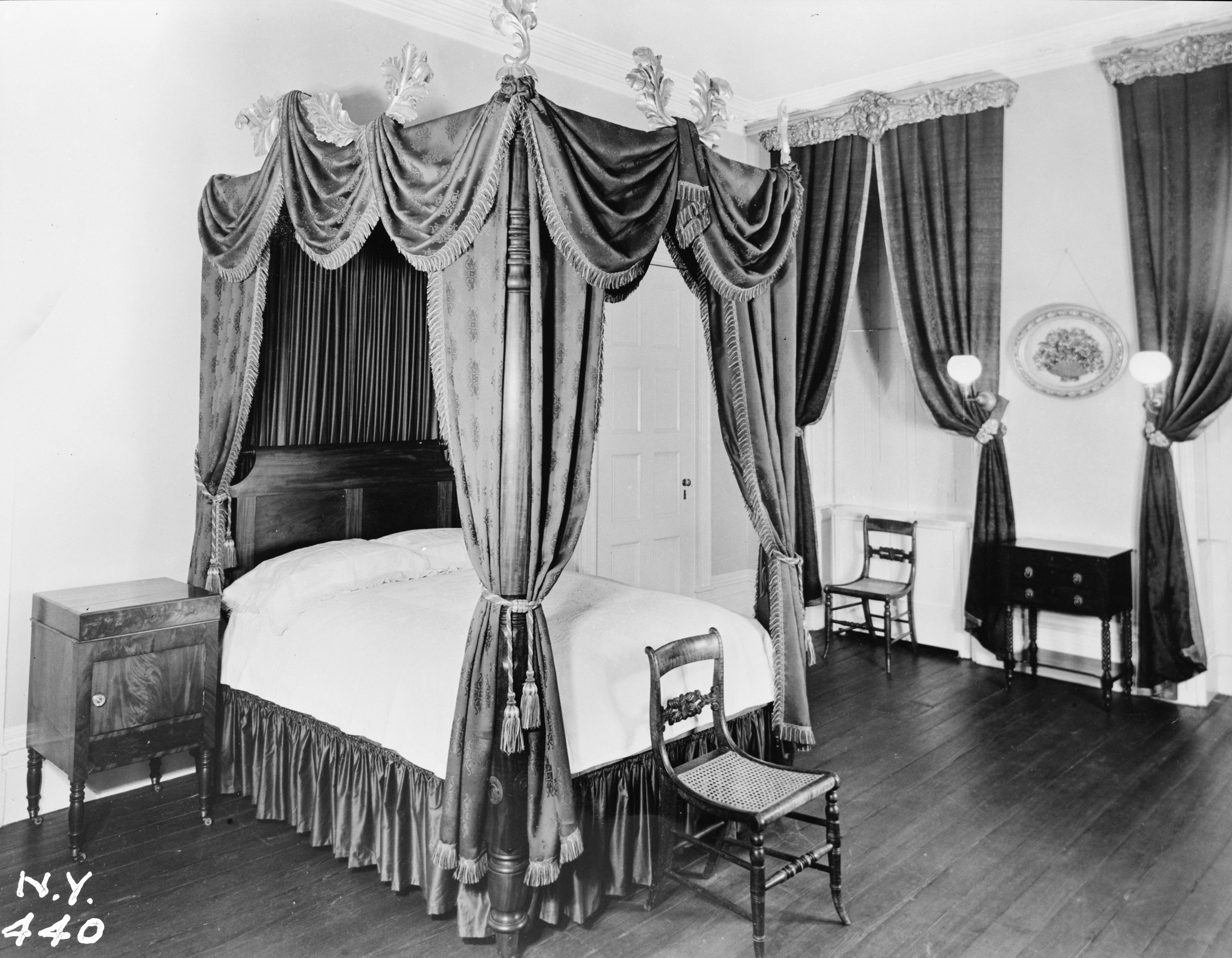
One of the bedrooms as it appeared in 1936

After Gertrude's death, Eliza Nichols, the daughter of Gertrude's oldest sister Elizabeth, wished to pay off the house's mortgage by selling both the structure and the objects inside. George Chapman purchased the building, saving it from foreclosure and demolition, and he paid Gertrude's mortgage. According to The New York Times, Chapman's acquisition had taken place "the night before the house and its furnishings were to go on public auction". He formed the Historic Landmark Society, which acquired the building and converted it into a museum called the Old Merchants' House. The new name was intended as a tribute to New York City's early merchants, including Seabury Tredwell. The Tredwells' items, clothing, table settings, and furniture were all displayed in their original condition, or as close to it as possible.

==== 1930s to 1960s ====
On May 8, 1936, the society held a private reception for the museum, which opened three days later on May 11. The New York State Education Department installed a plaque the same month, commemorating the fact that the house had been Seabury Tredwell's residence, and numerous photographs of the structure were taken as part of the Historic American Buildings Survey, and photographs of the interior were exhibited at Columbia University's Avery Architectural and Fine Arts Library. The Historic Landmark Society launched a fundraising campaign in 1943, seeking to raise $100,000 (equivalent to $1,861,000 in 2025), but had received only $7,000 within two years (equivalent to $125,000 in 2025). At the time, the society spent $3,500 annually just to operate the museum (equivalent to $63,000 in 2025), and its 50-cent admission fee and 2,500 annual visitors were not enough to pay the operating costs. This led Chapman to warn that the building was in danger of being sold. Ultimately, he continued to operate the house as a museum. The museum's caretakers, married couple Harry Lundberg and Florence Helm, lived in the basement; Helm lived there until her death in 1954.

The museum attracted 1,000 visitors annually by 1950. By the next year, the endowment fund had grown to $25,000 (equivalent to $310,000 in 2025) but was still short of its goal. The Boston-based Hale Foundation promised to donate $45,000 (equivalent to $558,000 in 2025) if the museum's operators were able to match the donation, but this did not happen. Consolidated Edison installed a gas heating system in the museum in 1955. By the 1960s, the house was in very poor condition and needed $200,000 in repairs (equivalent to $2,043,000 in 2025). According to New York Times architectural critic Ada Louise Huxtable, the structure was so weak that a severe storm could potentially destroy the plaster ceilings, and the original furnishings were "ready to crumble on a touch". The museum still did not have enough visitors to finance its own operation. Museum officials had unsuccessfully attempted to obtain funding from private donors, and Randolph Jack, its curator, was personally paying for the museum's upkeep.

Jack indicated in early 1965 that the house and the objects inside might be sold to raise money. The New York City Landmarks Preservation Commission (LPC) described the building as "a document of great importance for its authenticity" but, at the time, had no legal power to preserve the house. Following this announcement, preservationists asked both federal and state officials to protect the house as a landmark, and a hundred children protested the planned demolition. Architects also proposed alternate uses for the structure to preserve it, and hundreds of people testified in support of the edifice's preservation at a public hearing. That October, the LPC designated the Merchant's House Museum as one of the first-ever official city landmarks.

==== 1970s renovation ====
In the late 1960s, the museum tried to raise money for a restoration through events such as a tour of Staten Island. The Decorators Club expressed interest in restoring the house, and the museum was closed for some restoration work during August 1968. The club hired Joseph Roberto, an architect employed at the nearby New York University, to consult on waterproofing issues. The club had raised $5,000 at the time, all of which was used to restore the cornice. Although Roberto wrote various letters to officials, asking them to fund the restoration, the project did not attract further attention until 1970, when Huxtable wrote about the house. The New York City government and the New York State Historic Trust provided initial funding for the renovation in 1970, and the Historic Trust disbursed several more grants later that decade, which were matched by private and public donors. The renovation also received funding from the federal government.

Roberto designed the house's renovation, donating about $500,000 worth of services. Also involved in the project was Roberto's wife, Carol, an interior designer. The Robertos, along with six other people, were named as museum trustees. Structural and exterior work began in 1972 and was completed in three phases. The project involved rebuilding the foundation, replacing bricks along the party walls, replacing the slate roof, and reattaching the facade to the inner wall. The ceilings of the drawing rooms, which were physically beginning to peel apart due to vibrations from traffic, were tied together with wire. Interior work commenced in 1974; about $100,000 was allocated to restoring the interior and adding plumbing, heating, and electrical wiring. The furniture was restored, and one carpet had to be completely replaced because of its tattered condition. Workers repainted the walls to their original off-white color. Other objects, such as lighting fixtures, were also restored, and Lawrence Majewski was hired to refurbish the cast iron railings.

At the time of the renovation, the city landmark designation applied only to the exterior, so there were concerns that the house's interior could be significantly altered. The city was in the midst of the 1975 fiscal crisis, leading The Christian Science Monitor to describe the renovation as "a bright spot in these sad times for New York City". The first floor reopened in November 1979. The museum received an additional $70,000 to refurbish the second floor, a project that was completed in 1980. The project had cost $280,000, funded by over two dozen donors, and museum officials planned to spend another $100,000 to restore the kitchen and bedrooms. For his work on the restoration, Roberto received a certificate of merit from the Municipal Art Society. The Robertos retained an office at the front of the house.

==== 1980s and 1990s ====
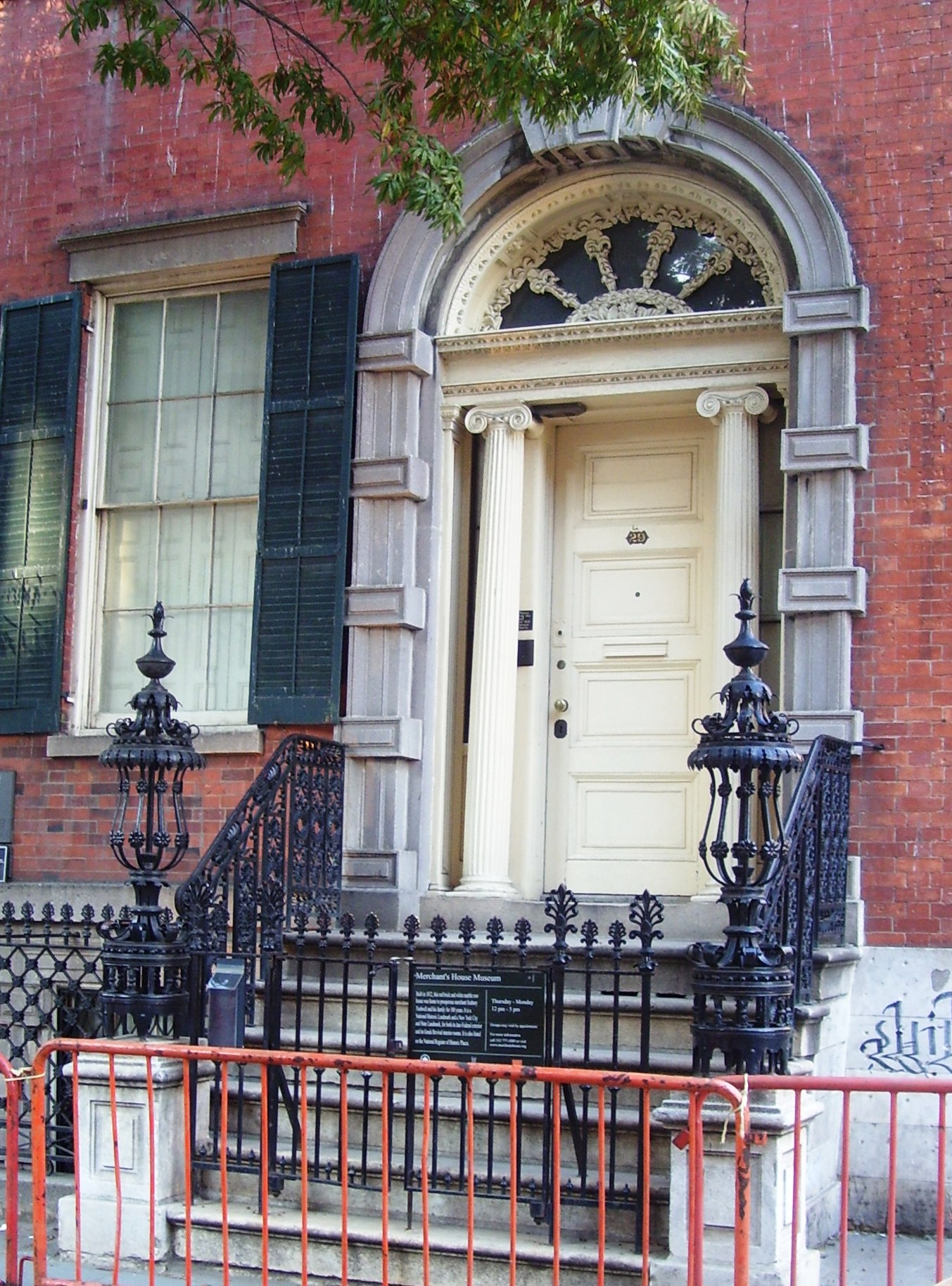
Entrance to the museum

After the museum reopened, the basement, first, and second floors were opened to the public, and visitors could also visit the garden in the rear. The New York Times wrote in 1987: "The house is very much alive these days with its occasional use for special events and celebrations." In 1988, three buildings to the east were demolished, one of which shared a party wall with the Seabury Tredwell House. Because there was no retaining wall to the east, a crack formed along the length of the house, and the interiors suffered water damage; this caused $1 million in damage to the house. When Joseph Roberto died in 1988, the museum began searching for new staff.

The museum hired several staff members in April 1990, including executive director Margaret Halsey Gardiner, and spent $600,000 to stabilize the structure. The repairs nearly depleted the museum's finances. The sculptor David Flaharty was hired to restore the interior plasterwork, and architectural firm Jan Hird Pokorny was hired to research the house's history and architecture as part of the museum's master plan. In addition, researchers began excavating the backyard for archeological studies. After a renovation lasting eight or nine months, the museum reopened in December 1991. Under the auspices of the New York Landmarks Conservancy, in 1994, workers removed graffiti that had accumulated on the facade. The Vincent Astor Foundation gave the Merchant's House Museum a $1 million grant in 1997, and the museum joined the Historic House Trust of New York City in the late 1990s.

==== 2000s to present ====
During the early 21st century, the museum hosted tours of the surrounding neighborhood to raise money, since it was susceptible to fluctuations in New York City tourism numbers. By the 2010s, forty volunteers operated the museum, which had 15,000 annual visitors. The surrounding neighborhood had become a fashionable residential area. An analysis from The Wall Street Journal found that, if the building were still functioning as a residence, it could have been sold for $6 million in 2018.

In 2012, Kalodop II Park Corporation proposed an eight-story hotel immediately west of the Seabury Tredwell House. Because the hotel's construction could impact the house's structural integrity, the LPC had to review the plans. The hotel's developers promised that the development would not damage the museum and that the new building would provide structural reinforcement to the house. The LPC eventually approved the hotel in 2014 after rejecting three earlier plans. The LPC formed a plan to preserve the museum while the hotel was being constructed. Gardiner opposed the hotel's construction, as did preservationists who argued that the development could destabilize the Seabury Tredwell House. Gardiner submitted a petition to the New York Supreme Court in early 2018, claiming that the New York City Department of City Planning had approved the hotel project based on erroneous information from Kalodop. She claimed that the hotel's construction could cause the house to collapse, and museum officials put up signs warning that the museum could be bankrupted by increasing legal costs. Gardiner formally sued the DCP and Kalodop in mid-2018, and a subcommittee of the New York City Council voted against the hotel plans that September.

A revised plan was approved in late 2023. Although the LPC required the developer to agree to several restrictions to avoid damaging the Merchant's House Museum, Gardiner said that vibrations from construction could cause "irreparable" damage and threatened to sue. As the dispute over the adjacent hotel development continued, NYC Parks announced plans in 2024 to renovate the Seabury Tredwell House. A $5.2 million renovation of the exterior began in mid-2025; the front entrance was temporarily closed, and visitors had to enter through the rear garden, accessed via Manuel Plaza. A passage at the house, used to shelter slaves on the Underground Railroad, was rediscovered in early 2026, increasing the museum's patronage and prompting renewed calls to preserve the house. After the LPC considered revised plans for the neighboring development that year, Al Sharpton and other preservationists asked the agency to reject the plans; the LPC heard testimony on the proposal that September.

== Architecture ==
Though parts of the Seabury Tredwell House's design may have been derived from books of architectural patterns published in the 1820s and 1830s, no single architect has been credited. The National Park Service (NPS) attributes the design to Menard Lafever, while the historian Barbaralee Diamonstein-Spielvogel writes that Joseph Brewster, who built the house, was inspired by Lafever. In his 1964 book Greek Revival Architecture in America, the architectural critic Talbot Hamlin says that the building's plaster and wood decorations were similar to a set of patterns that Lafever had published in 1826. The architectural writer Donald Reynolds states that three of Lafever's pattern books inspired parts of the house's design. The Chicago Tribune claimed in 1957 that John McComb Jr., who had designed New York City Hall, also designed the mansion.

The Seabury Tredwell House has a Federal-style facade and a Greek Revival interior, though sources disagree on which style is more predominant. Huxtable and Town & Country magazine described the Greek Revival style as being more prominent, particularly inside the house, and Diamonstein-Spielvogel and journalist David W. Dunlap describe the exterior design as Federal. The NPS's report on the building describes it as being designed in a transitional Greek Revival style, while a Chicago Tribune critic said in 1954 that the house was "the purest example of the so-called Federal style in New York". Conversely, The Christian Science Monitor described the design in 1945 as being "mainly of the late Georgian period", and Vogue magazine identified the design in 1941 as being a mixture of the Empire and Victorian styles.

The Seabury Tredwell House is likely the only house in New York City with a fully preserved 19th-century interior, as well as one of the few late-Federal-style houses in the city that have not undergone significant changes to their design. By the 1980s, the Seabury Tredwell House was Manhattan's only remaining 19th-century house that retained its original furnishings.

=== Exterior ===
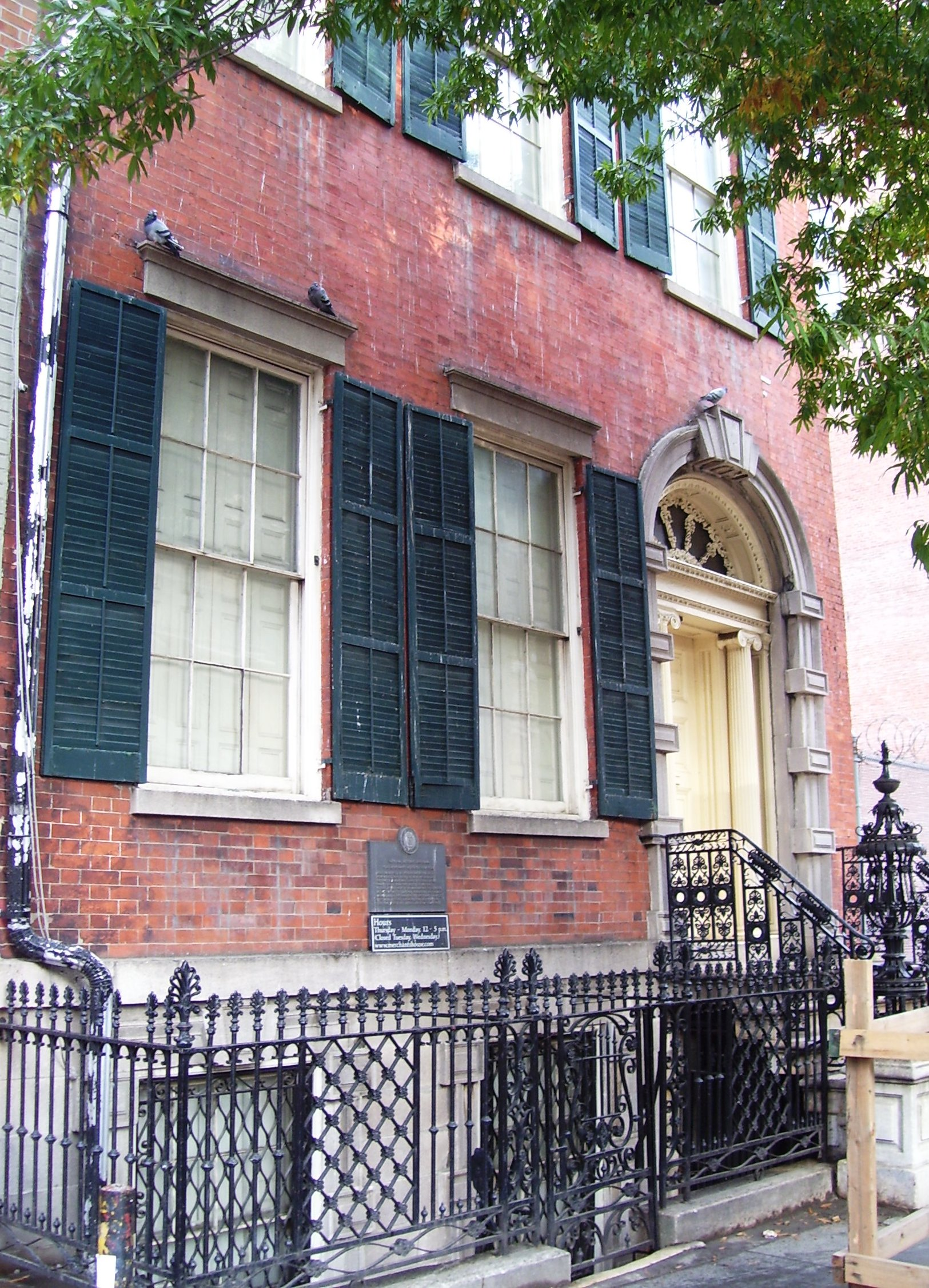
Side view of the facade

The exterior of the Seabury Tredwell House is four stories high and is divided vertically into three bays on each floor. The basement is raised, so the first story is half a floor above ground. The facade was identical to that of the five other houses developed by Brewster, as well as three houses developed on Hudson Street in 1833; these houses have all been demolished. Another house, on 56 West 10th Street, also copied the Seabury Tredwell House's design. The brick party walls to the east of the Seabury Tredwell House were originally shared with residences on either side.

A decorative iron railing separates the house from the street and is decorated with finials and newel posts. On the eastern side of the facade, a flight of six steps with iron railings leads up to the main entrance. There are Ionic columns on either side of the doorway, above which is an arch with a semicircular fanlight. On the cellar and the first through third floors, the facade is made of brick. The fourth floor is placed within a steeply sloped gable roof made of slate tiles. There are two protruding dormer windows on the fourth story.

At the rear of the house is a wood frame annex built in 1850, with a stairway leading from the first floor down to a small garden. There is a toilet under the steps and a cistern in the yard. Another stair leads up from the basement to the garden. The cistern, with a capacity of 4,000 U.S. gallons (15,000 L), predates the construction of the Croton Aqueduct, which once supplied New York City's water system. The garden had four magnolia trees in the mid-20th century; it has been modified over the years and contained typical 19th-century plants by the 2000s. Some of these plants, including vinca, columbine, and black-eyed Susan vines, were grown from specimens that had been excavated from the garden. The garden is open to the public.

=== Interior ===
The house has 18 rooms across a gross floor area of 4,218 square feet (392 m^{2}). The Seabury Tredwell House has a similar layout to many 19th-century rowhouses in New York City. The basement contains the kitchen and family room, and the first story features the formal double parlors. There are bedrooms on the second through fourth stories; the bedrooms on the top story were used as servants' quarters. There was also a coal room below the basement, which was converted into a heating plant at some point before the 1960s. Materials such as Siena marble and plasterwork were commonplace at the time of the house's construction and were used throughout the building.

==== Basement ====
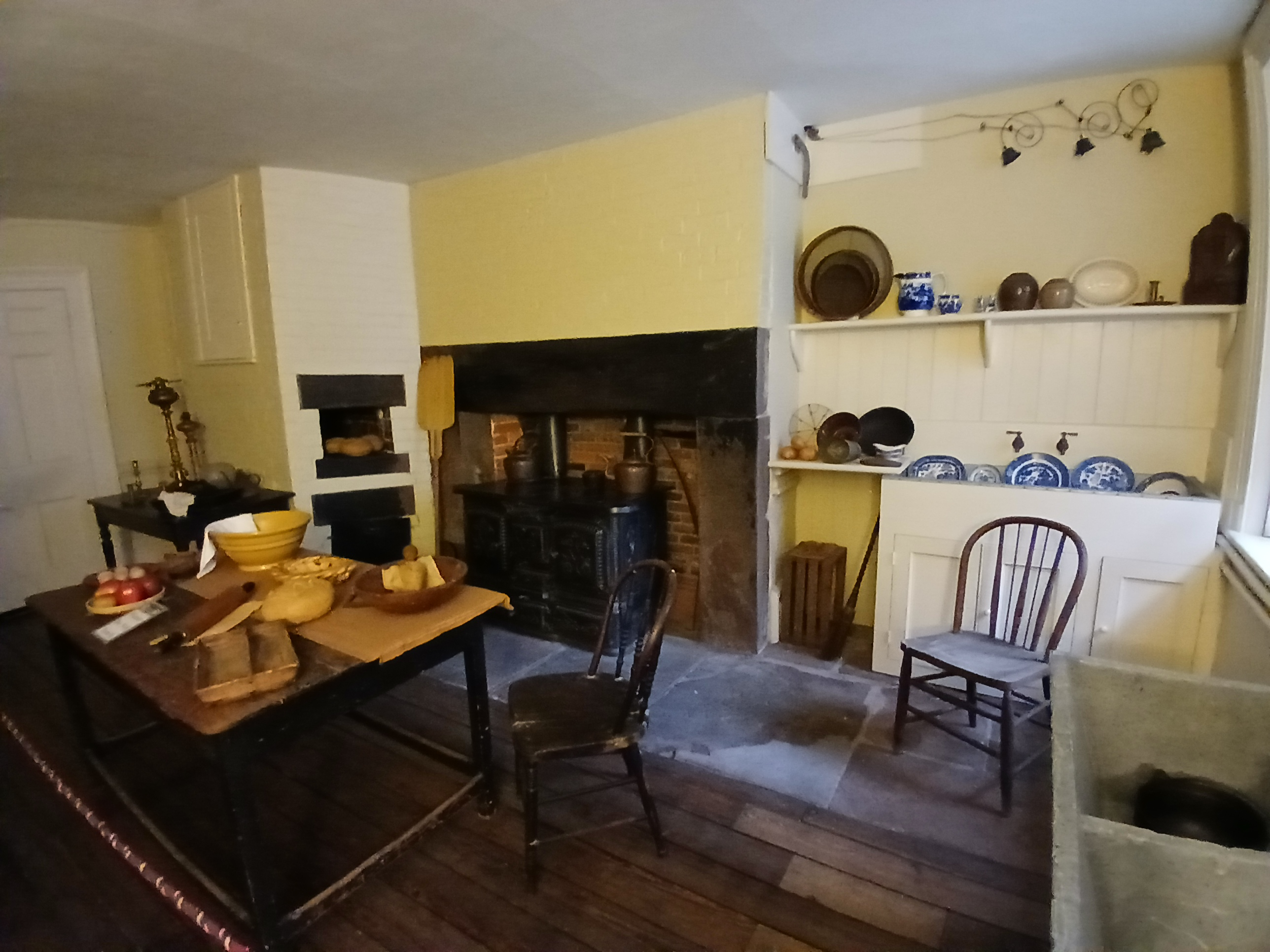
The kitchen

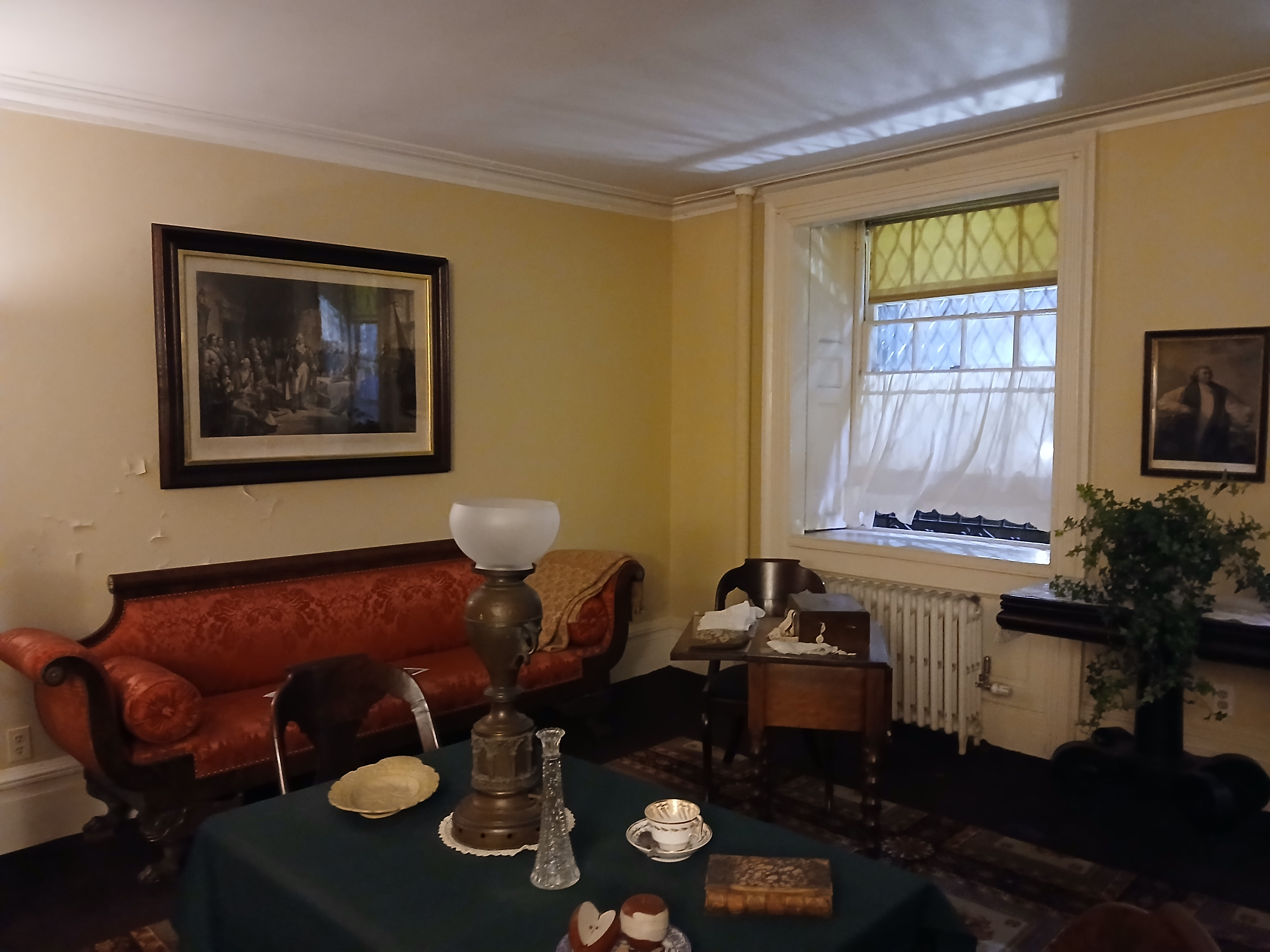
The family room

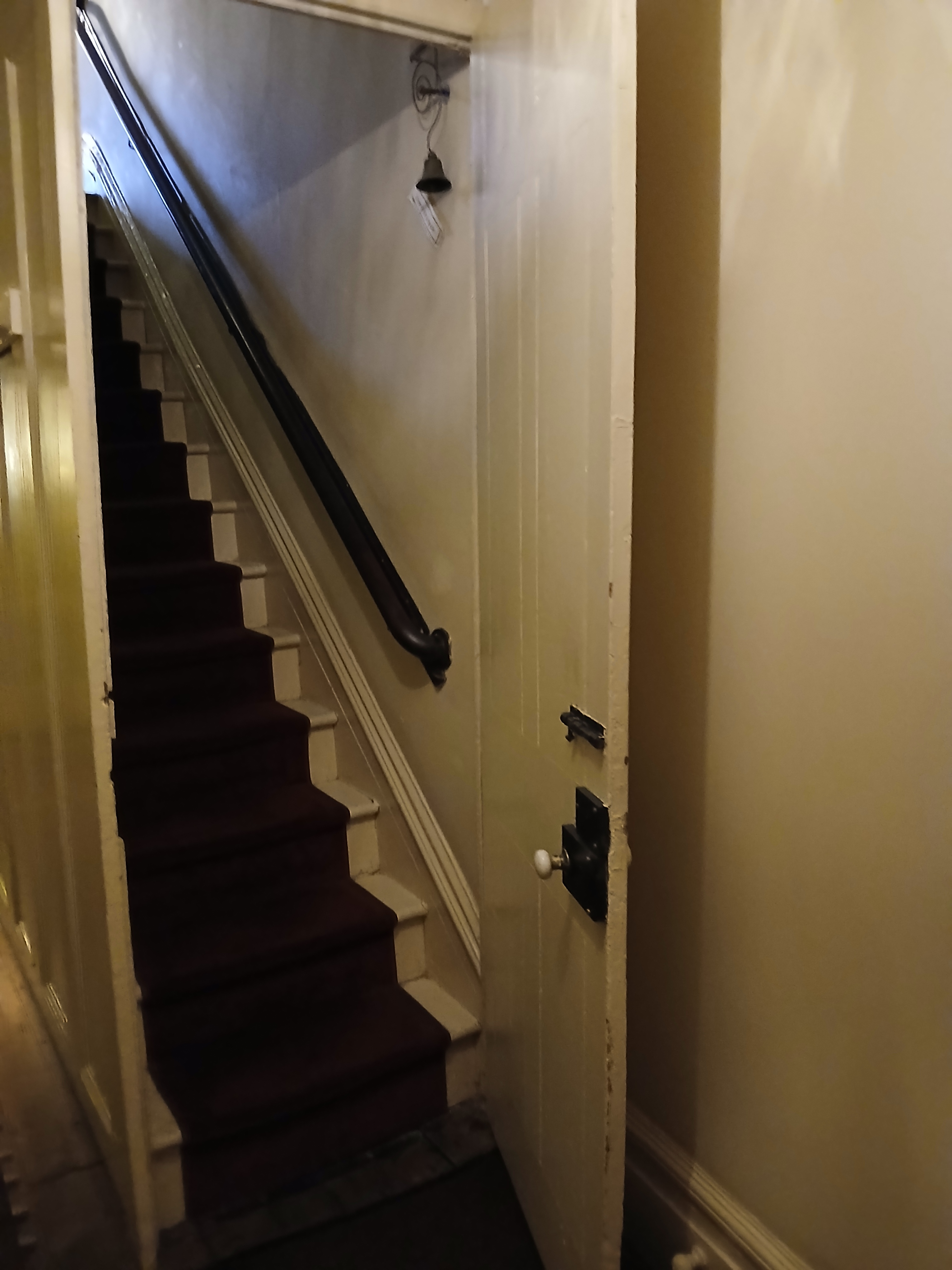
The hallway on the eastern side of the basement

The raised basement consists of a family room in the front and a kitchen in the rear. Between these two rooms were a pair of closets and a pantry (later converted into bathrooms and a kitchenette). All of these spaces are connected by a hallway on the eastern side of the basement. The family room has peach-colored walls, a sash window on the south wall, and a fireplace with a marble mantelpiece. Visitors were not ordinarily invited into the family room, which functioned as a sitting and dining room; the space was used for activities such as sewing, reading, writing, and mending clothes. After the house was converted to a museum, the family room became a children's playroom exhibit.

The kitchen features built-in Dutch ovens and a fireplace. The kitchen originally had a dumbwaiter, stove, and sink, which were removed in the 1930s. The floors are made of wood, while the fireplace, a sink, and a closet are on the western wall. The sink had a hand pump, which drew water from the backyard cistern. There is also a brick oven and a cast-iron stove on this wall. On the kitchen's other three walls, the lower portions are wainscoted with wooden boards, while the upper portions are made of plaster. The eastern and southern walls have bells that occupants could use to call servants.

==== First story ====
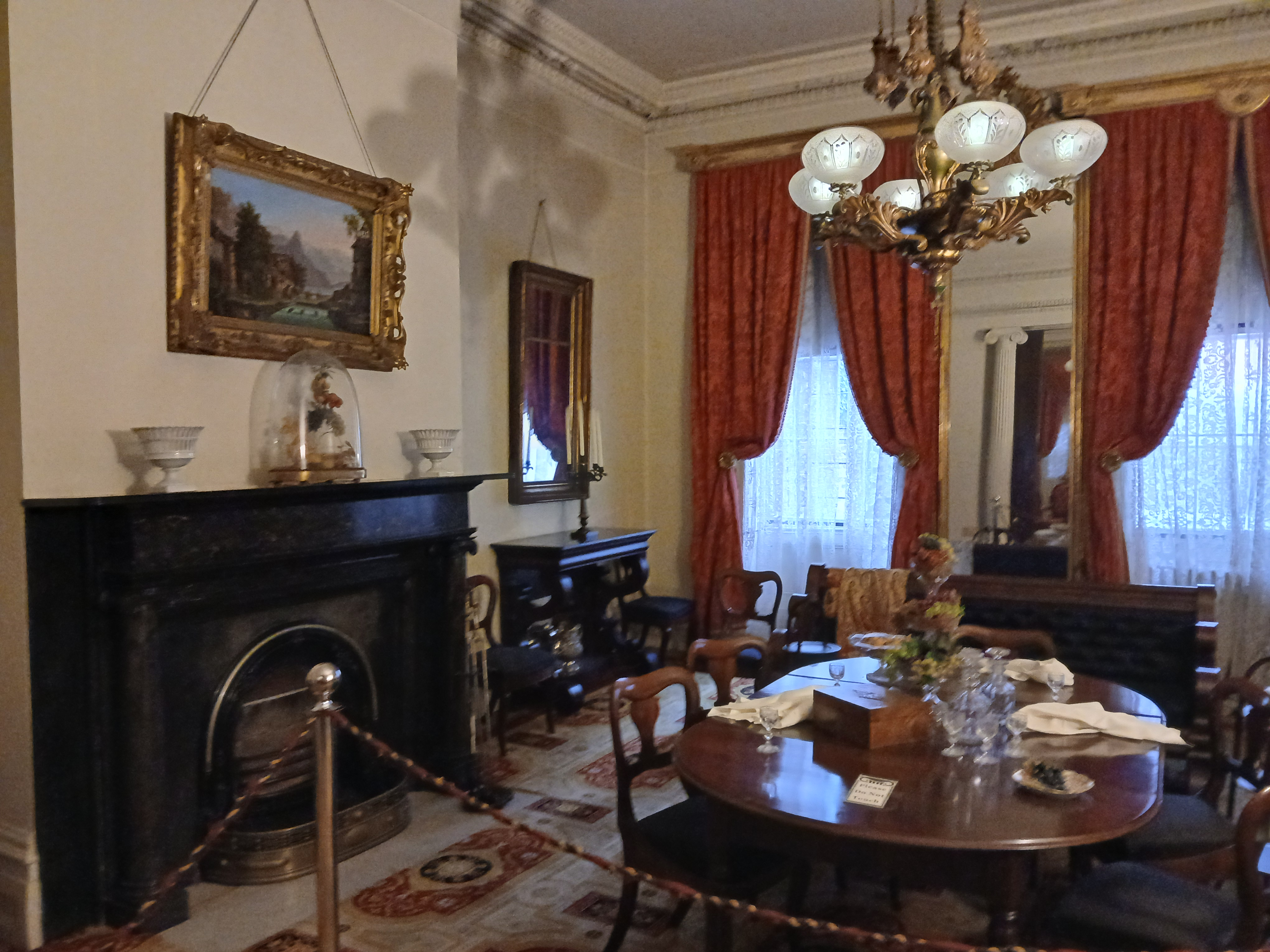
The rear parlor

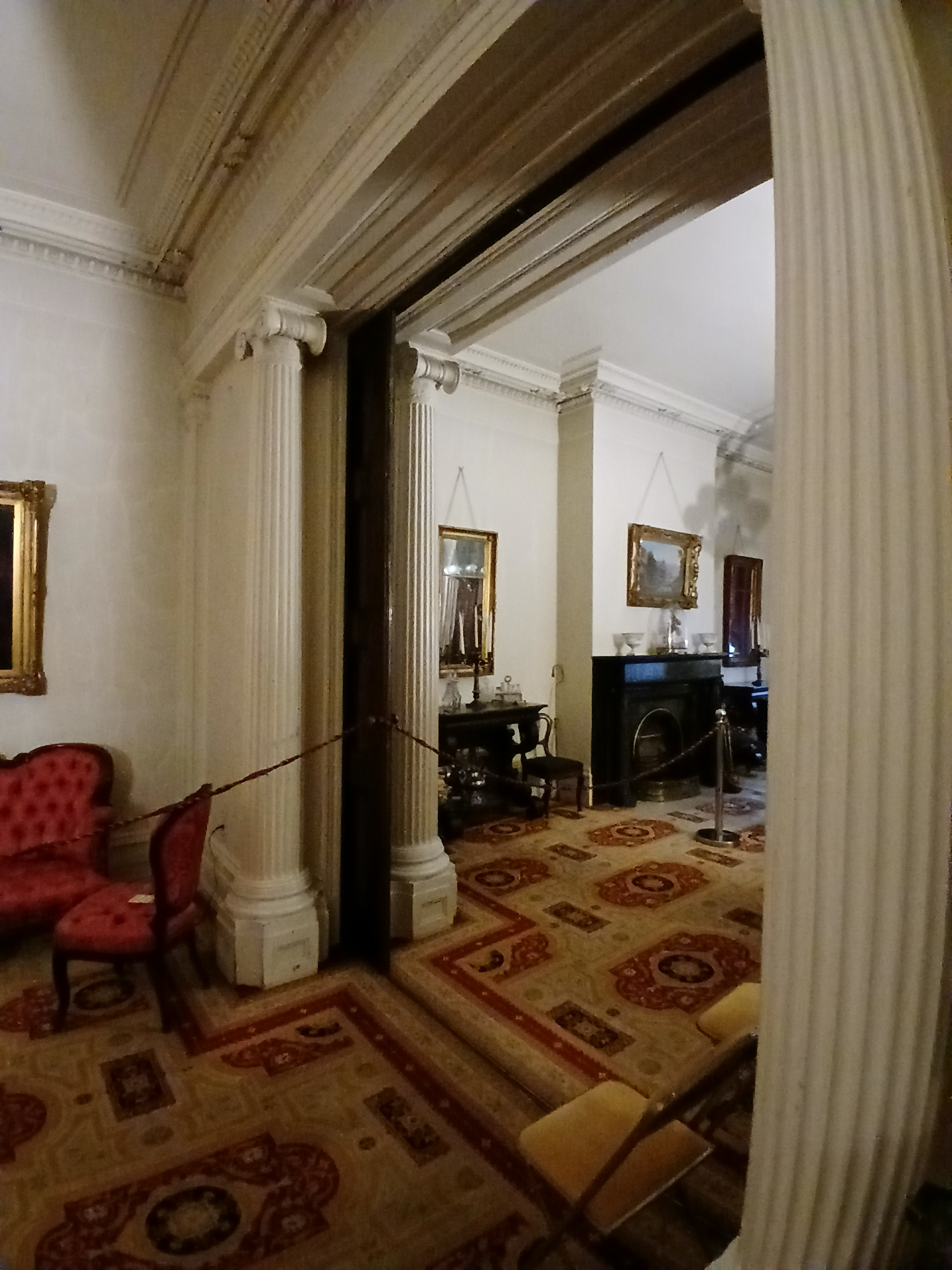
Doorway between the front parlor (left) and rear parlor (right)

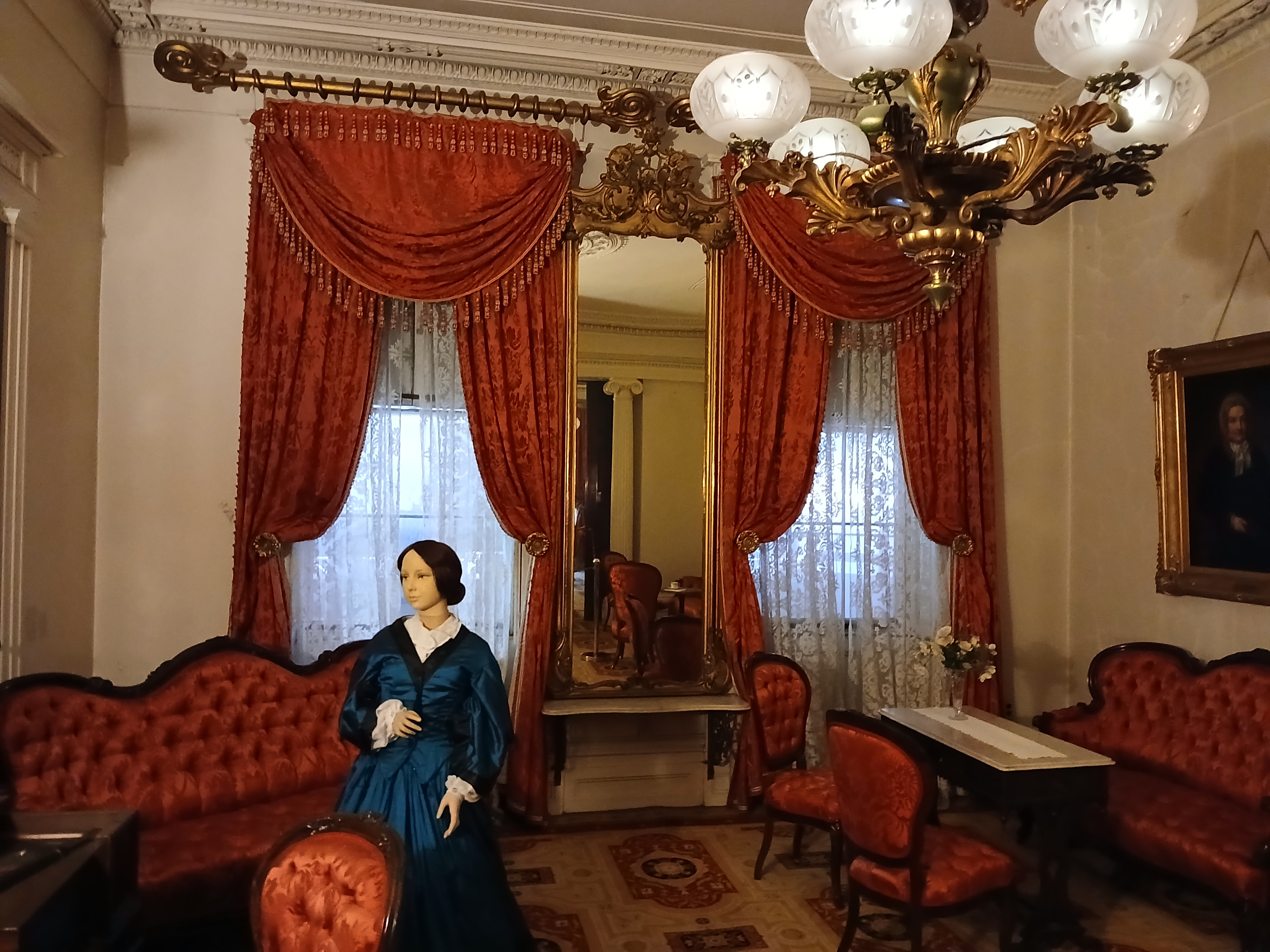
The front parlor

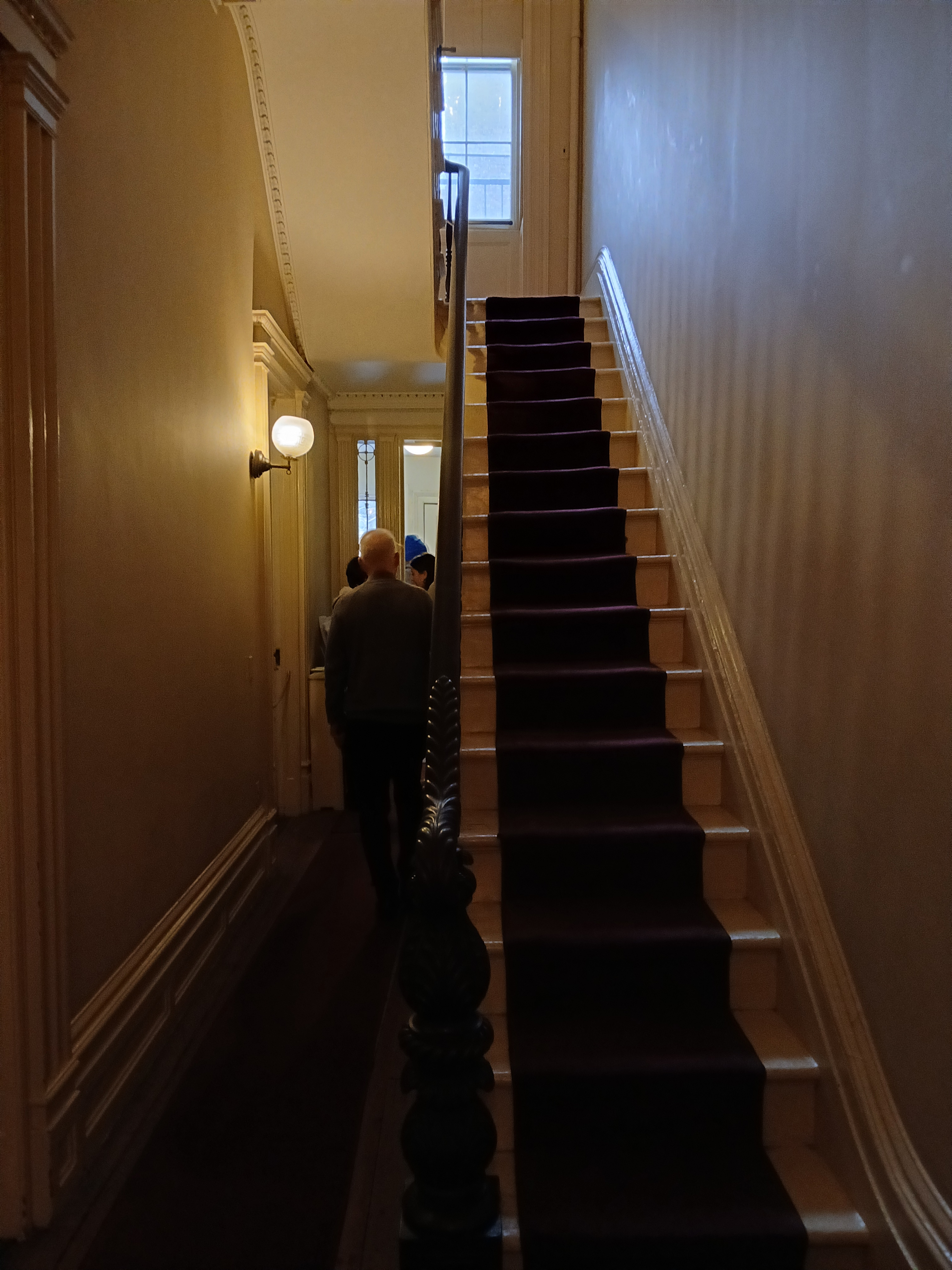
The hallway on the eastern side of the first floor

The Seabury Tredwell House's main entrance leads to a square vestibule with a marble floor. The vestibule has painted walls topped by a cornice, while the ceiling has a rosette at its center. A door on the vestibule's north wall leads to the main first-floor hallway, which runs along the eastern side of the first floor. The hallway's walls have a molded plaster cornice and a ceiling rosette with a cut-glass lantern. A stair to the second floor ascends along the right side of the hallway, and a door underneath the stair leads to a tea room. To the west of the main hallway are the two parlors. The parlors are accessed by three mahogany doors, which are flanked by classically styled pilasters and topped by a lintel with egg-and-dart motifs.

Because the parlors were intended to be symmetrical, both rooms have two doorways on their eastern walls, but one of the front parlor's doorways is a false door. Both rooms also have sash windows and 14-foot-tall (4.3 m) ceilings. The rooms are connected by a doorway with Ionic fluted columns. Between the columns is a sliding mahogany door that separates the rooms. Each of the parlors also has wide wooden baseboards and a cornice with elaborate decorations. There are fireplaces in both rooms, with coal grates, white marble hearthstones, and marble mantelpieces. In addition, the ceilings of each parlor have rosettes with bronze chandeliers. The floors are covered with replicas of a moquette carpet that the Tredwells used.

There is a secret passage or shaft in the wall between the two first-floor parlors, which leads up to a bureau between the second-story master bedrooms. Located along the western side of the house, the shaft measures 2 by 2 feet (0.61 by 0.61 m) and has a ladder. A New York Herald Tribune article from 1938 was unable to ascertain when or why the passage was built. An LPC report from 1981 described several rumors regarding the passageway as being unfounded, including claims that it connected to the street, was used to sneak suitors into the house, or was used to shelter fugitive slaves as part of the Underground Railroad; the latter claim may stem from the fact that Seabury Tredwell was an abolitionist. The LPC report indicated that the passage was likely used to facilitate the maintenance of the sliding parlor doors, but a museum curator said in 1965 that the passageway terminated in a dead end. In 2026, researchers determined that the passage had instead likely been built by Brewster to shelter slaves as part of the Underground Railroad, and that the Tredwells may not have known of its existence. Researchers ascertained that the passage had been part of the house's original design but could not determine whether it had once continued into the basement.

==== Upper stories ====
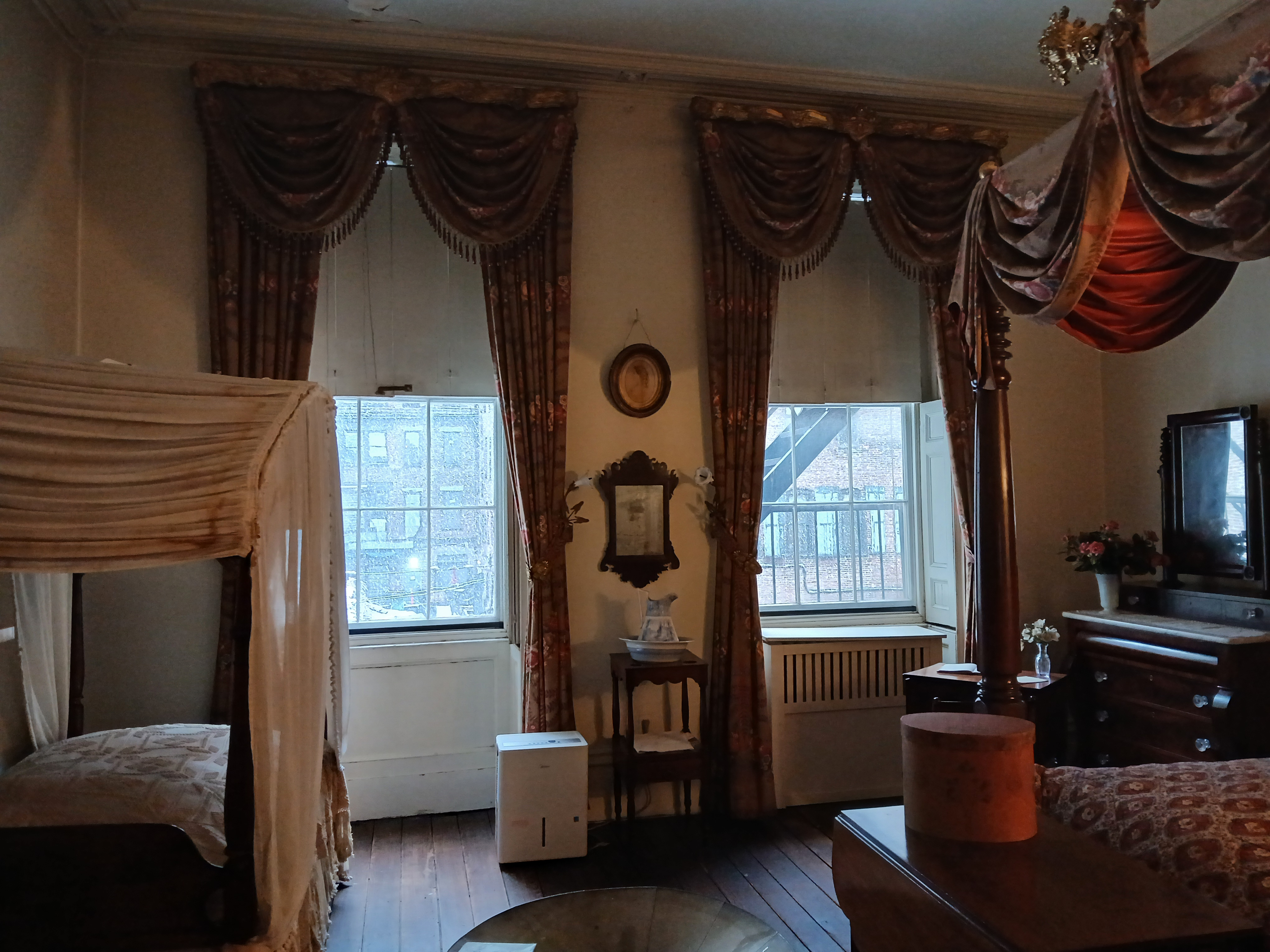
The rear second-floor bedroom

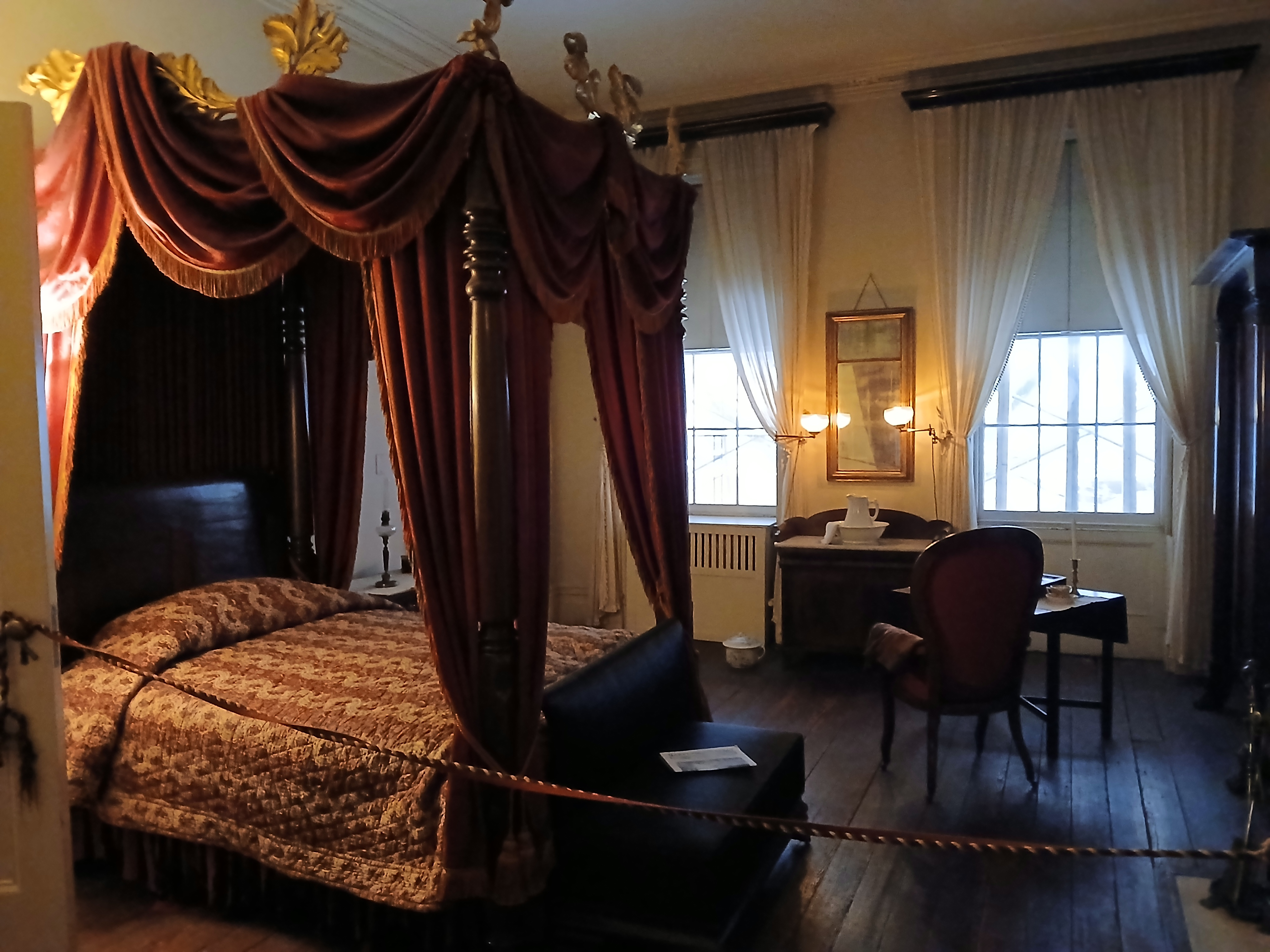
The front second-floor bedroom

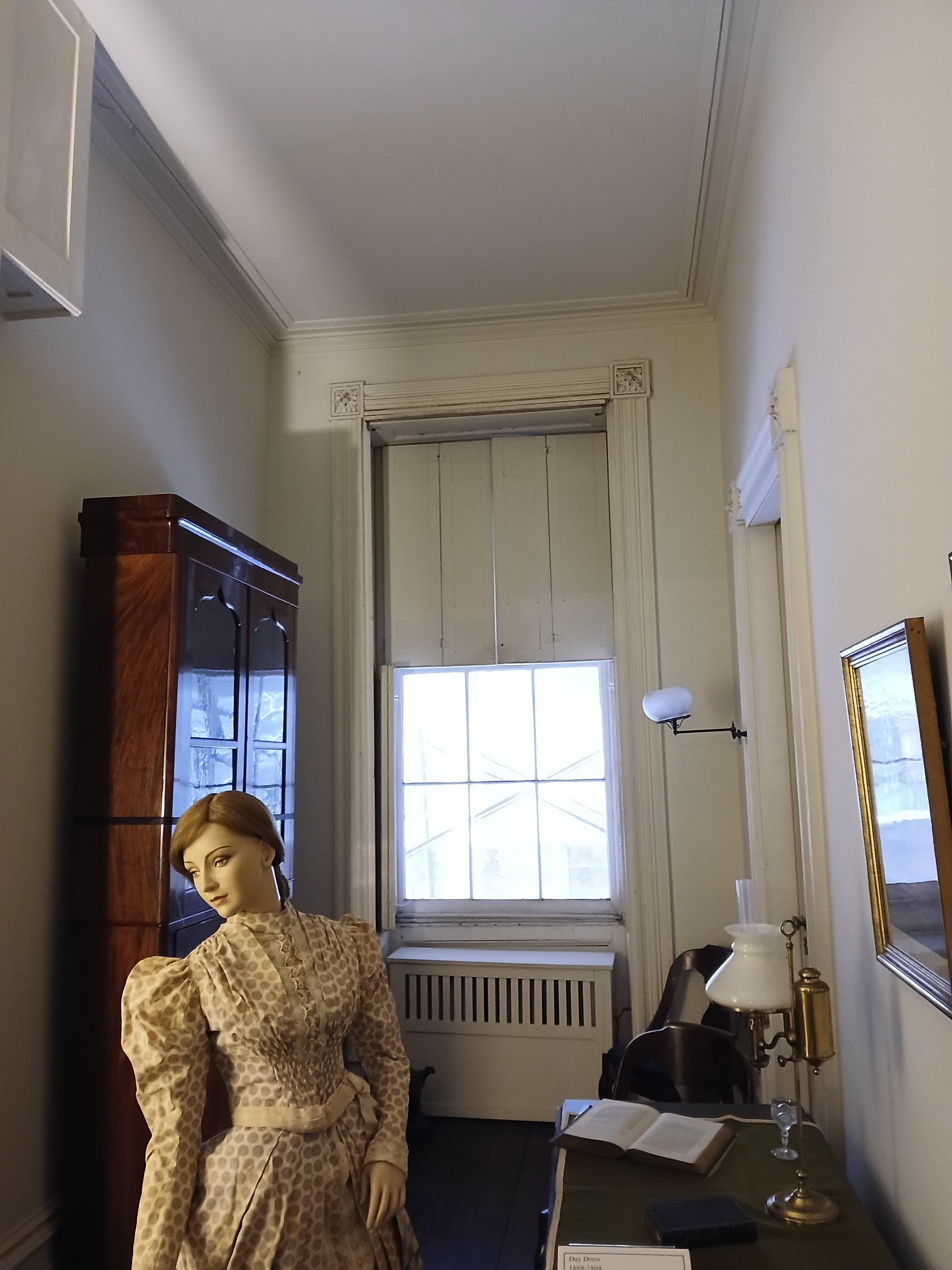
The front second-floor study

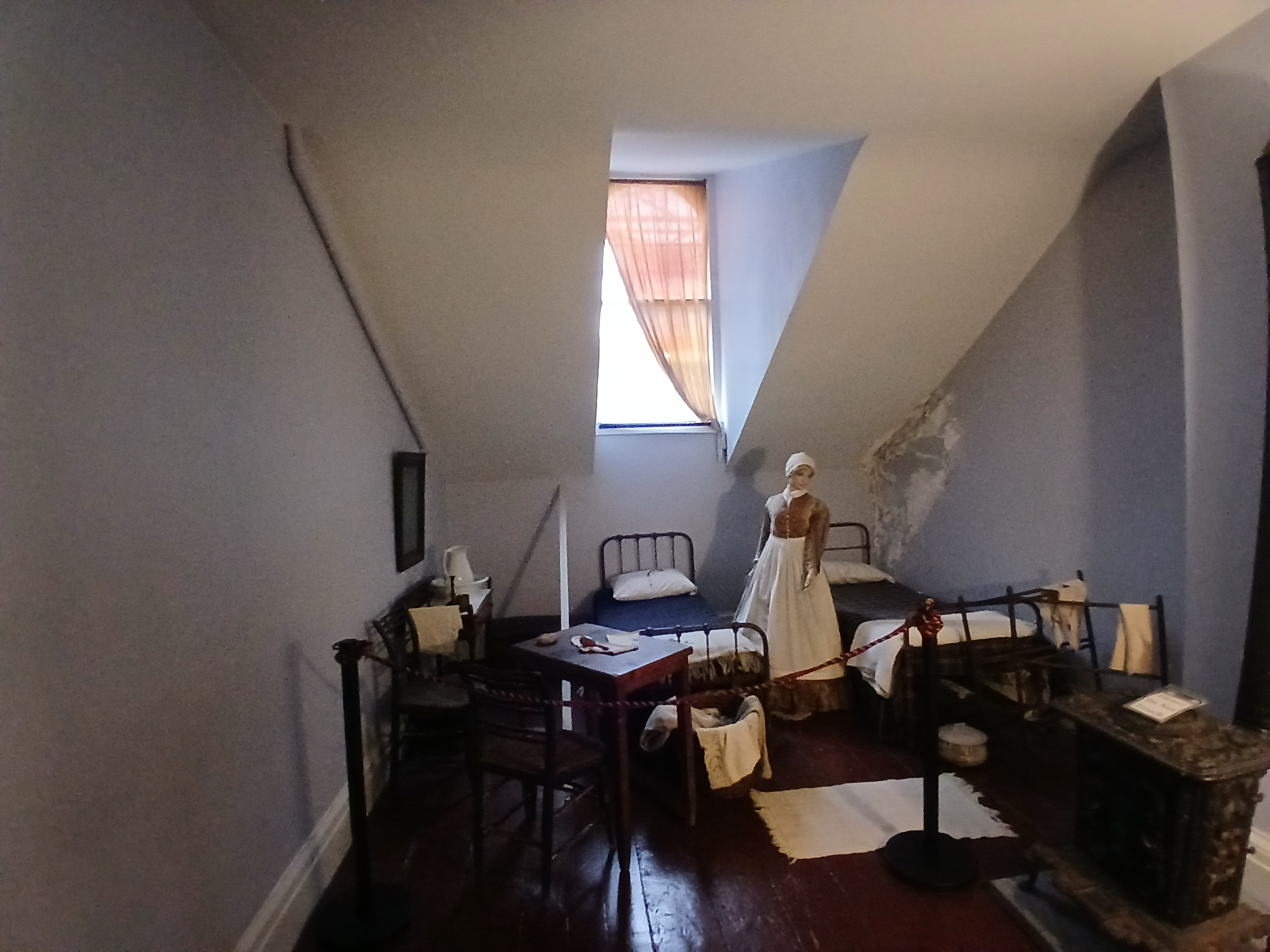
The servants' quarters in the attic

A hallway extends the entire depth of the second story and is illuminated by a lamp made of cut glass and etched glass. There are three bedrooms on this story: a "hall bedroom" on the southeast and two master bedrooms to the southwest and northwest. The hall bedroom, the smallest of the three bedrooms, was also used as a study. The two master bedrooms have Greek Revival-style doorways and windows with pilasters, lintels, architraves, and cornices. Each master bedroom has two gaslit sconces, in addition to a fireplace with white hearthstones, marble mantels, and a coal grate. The cornices and plaster rosettes in the bedrooms are scaled-down versions of those in the first-floor parlors. The northern master bedroom has a straw carpet, and the two southern bedrooms have carpets with geometric patterns. The original four-poster beds in both bedrooms were preserved, complete with draperies.

The third-floor bedrooms have woodwork decorations, which are plainer in design than the furnishings on the second floor. The bedrooms on the third floor were used by the Tredwell family's children. On the fourth floor is a servants' living room leading to four bedrooms.

==== Staircases ====
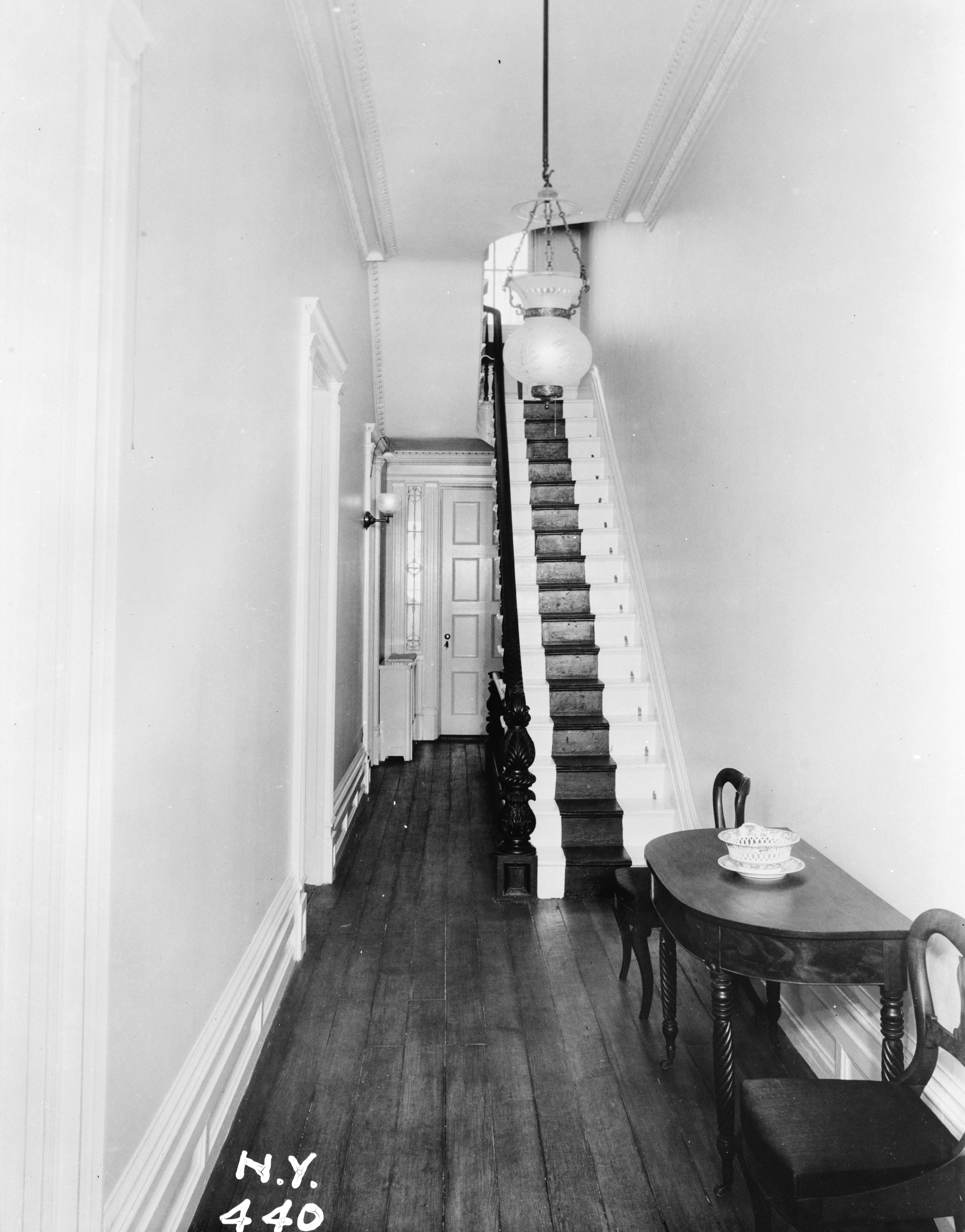
Main staircase (1936)

The house's staircases are stacked atop one another. There is a staircase between the basement and first floor along the extreme eastern end of the house. At the basement level, a wooden-paneled wall separates the staircase from the basement hallway, and there is a door at the bottom of the stairs.

The staircase between the first and second floors has a mahogany handrail with mahogany and brass spindles. At the bottom of the handrail is a mahogany newel post with acanthus-leaf carvings. The stairway is interrupted by a landing halfway between the first and second stories, which is illuminated by a tall window on the northern wall. At the top of the handrail is a post with a carved acanthus leaf, which, according to architectural critic Talbot Hamlin, was designed in a style characteristic of cabinet maker Duncan Phyfe.

Another staircase connects the second and third floors, which also has mahogany spindles and a newel post. In the 1850s, the stair was moved about 42 inches (1,100 mm) north to accommodate a manually pulled elevator that carried Sarah Tredwell to her room. The elevator was supported by a rope and a winding mechanism in the attic, which are both still intact. The modern museum has no elevators.

== Operation ==
The New York City Department of Parks and Recreation owns the house. The Merchant's House Museum is operated by Old Merchant's House Inc., a nonprofit organization dedicated to running education programs, conserving the collections, and restoring the house and the objects inside. The museum sells tickets for guided, self-guided, and neighborhood tours. There are explanatory plaques in each room and docents throughout the museum. Old Merchant's House Inc. runs an online gift shop. The organization's endowment fund was established after the Vincent Astor Foundation disbursed $1 million in 1997.

=== Collection ===
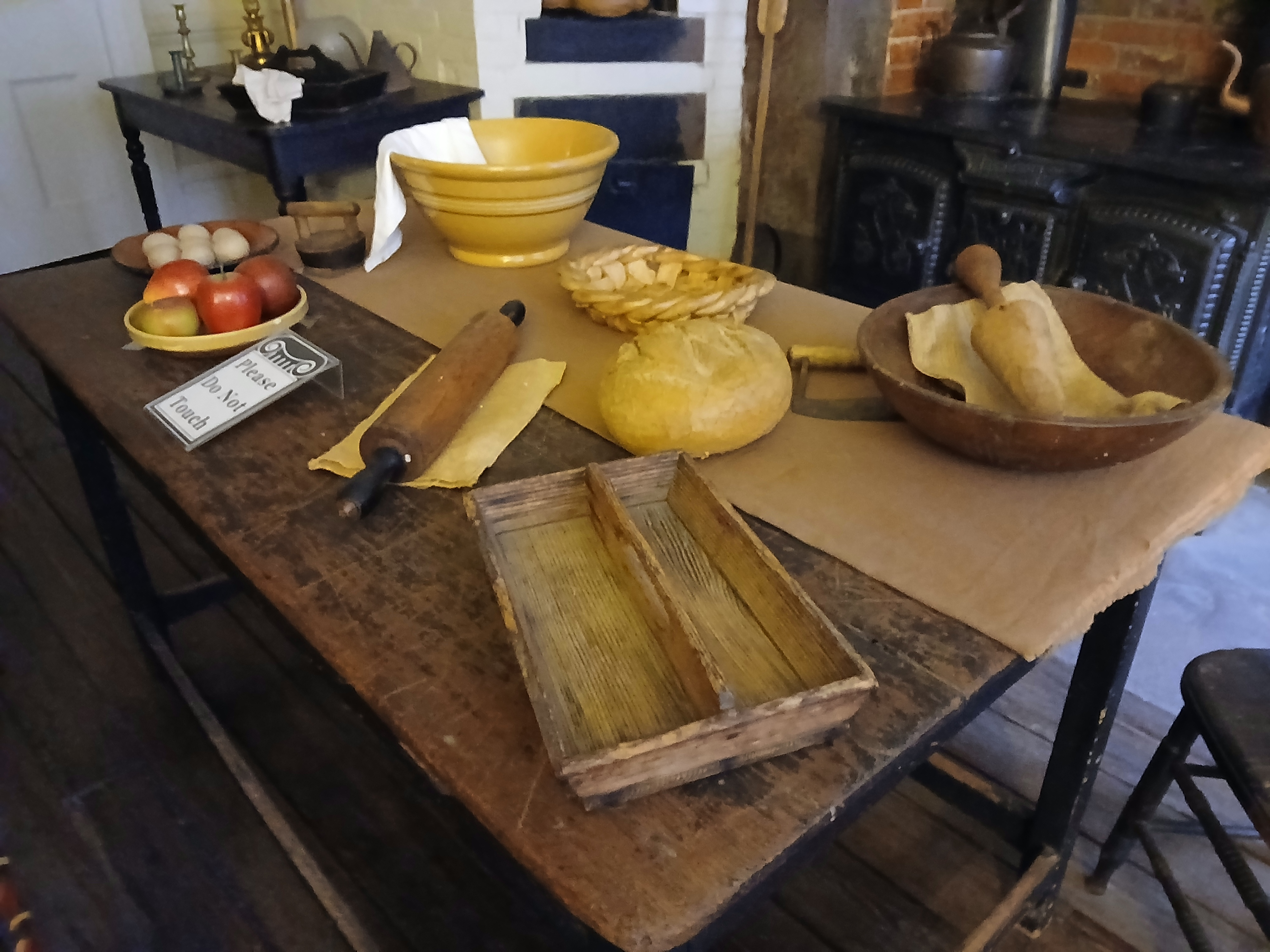
Items on display in the kitchen

As of 2022, the museum has almost 4,500 items in its collection. The items are broadly split into three categories. The oldest objects date to when Eliza and Seabury Tredwell married in 1820. The collection also features predominantly Greek-style items purchased after the couple moved to the house in 1835, as well as Victorian-style items purchased by Eliza after her husband's death. Following the museum's 1970s renovation, the museum has exclusively exhibited the Tredwells' personal belongings.

When the museum opened in 1936, it contained the Tredwell family's original furnishings. These included pieces from local cabinetmaker Duncan Phyfe, furniture upholstered with horsehair, tables with marble tops, red damask curtains, and mahogany side chairs with red damask upholstery. A mahogany dining table and a dozen "balloon-backed" chairs are displayed in the two first-floor parlors. Toys and clothes are displayed on the upper floors. In the 1980s, one of the master bedrooms on the second floor was described as having an "1835 mahogany canopy bed and a child's walnut field bed", while the other had a chintz bed. The house has also had a music box, a grand piano, oil lamps, cupboards with rare china, and brass doorknobs.

The collection contains 39 dresses belonging to Eliza Tredwell and her daughters. These include ball gowns that the Tredwell sisters wore as children; peignoirs that they wore to breakfast; and black taffetas that they wore in their middle age. Some of the clothes in the collection are from Gertrude Tredwell's trunks of summer clothing. Objects such as combs, gowns, and fans were displayed in the walk-in closets, while mannequins with bonnets, gowns, gloves, and parasols were displayed in glass cases. The collection also includes several household items, such as cookware, 19th-century books and newspapers, and silver decorations. Tableware and mahogany pieces are shown in the parlor rooms, while objects such as the family's china collection and a pie safe are exhibited in the kitchen. Also on display are some needlepoint works that the Tredwells never completed.

=== Events and programming ===
Most of the museum's programming is educational and includes courses for both youth and adults. In 1991, the Greenwich Village Society for Historic Preservation and the Merchant's House Museum launched an educational program called Greenwich Village: History and Historic Preservation. The initiative ran through the end of the 1990s at the museum but eventually shifted its focus to the West Village.

Several events are regularly hosted at the house, such as music concerts in the parlor. The museum presents 19th-century romantic music every Valentine's Day and mock funerals with 19th-century theming during the fall. The house is sometimes redecorated with 1870s decor during the Christmas season. Throughout the year, the museum also hosts "ghost tours" by candlelight; since 2006, the tours have included vignettes of various family members.

Over the years, the house has also hosted other events, such as a 1946 benefit for the American Friends of France. The house has been used for performances, such as the off-Broadway plays Old New York: False Dawn in 1884, Ellen Terry (A Public and Private Talk With Our Most Beloved Actress) in 1996, and Bright Lights, Big City in 1999. John Kevin Jones hosted readings of Charles Dickens's novella A Christmas Carol at the house in the 2010s and 2020s, as well as readings of Walt Whitman's poetry. Other events at the house have included benefit dinners, summertime lunches within the backyard, open house celebrations, and parties. Though Alfred Hitchcock had wanted to produce a film at the house in 1956, the museum's operators prevented him from doing so.

== Impact ==
=== Reception ===
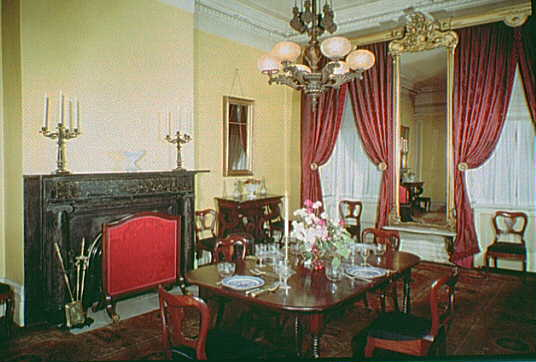
The rear parlor (1963)

Shortly after the museum opened, a writer for the Elmira, New York, Star-Gazette wrote that the house was "a marvelously authentic exhibit of the best of urban living", akin to the Morris–Jumel Mansion, because it showcased the family's actual artifacts. Vogue magazine wrote in 1941 that the museum had "a surprise in every closet", while a writer from the New York Times said in 1943 that the house's "graceful arrangement suggests a home actually lived in rather than a museum". Another Times critic similarly praised the "bourgeois splendor" of the house, and Huxtable wrote, "One simply walks through the beautiful doorway into another time and place in New York."

After the museum reopened in the 1980s, The Christian Science Monitor wrote that the surrounding industrial and commercial buildings contrasted with the cozy character of the house, particularly the ornate interior. A Los Angeles Times reporter stated that the house offered a simple recreation of a historical era rather than a contrived attempt at one, and the Toronto Star and American Heritage magazine both described the museum as a snapshot into a bygone era of living. A 2021 review by Condé Nast Traveler called the Merchant's House Museum "as close to a hidden gem as a New York City museum gets."

There has also been commentary on the house's architecture. Before the museum opened, a New York Times reporter wrote that "the house was built in the finest traditions of the period", citing its main entrance and brick facade. Dorothy Draper of the New York Herald Tribune wrote in 1948 that, while the front door stood out from the surrounding neighborhood, the "perfect proportions of the large rooms with their high ceilings and heavy moldings" were the most notable part of the interior. Arthur Meeker of the Chicago Daily Tribune praised the facade's appearance but criticized the interior as a disorganized mashup of items. Huxtable wrote that the AIA Guide to New York City had summarized "the importance of the Old Merchant's House in one bold-faced sentence: 'The original house is all there.'" Following the 1980s renovation, The Christian Science Monitor wrote that the double parlors had been called "two of the most beautiful rooms in America".

=== Landmark designations ===
Due to its architectural and historic importance, the Seabury Tredwell House has received several landmark designations. When the city's landmarks law was signed in April 1965, The Village Voice reported that the Seabury Tredwell House was "a likely candidate for salvation". The LPC designated the Seabury Tredwell House as one of the city's first 20 exterior landmarks in October 1965; The Wall Street Journal cites the house as Manhattan's first-ever designated city landmark. At a public hearing for the city-landmark designation, a curator for the Metropolitan Museum of Art described the house as "a unique, and I stress the word unique, survival in the City of New York". The building was designated as a National Historic Landmark in 1965, and it was added to the National Register of Historic Places on October 15, 1966. The LPC designated the Seabury Tredwell House's basement, first floor, and second floor as an interior landmark in 1981.

== See also ==
- List of museums and cultural institutions in New York City
- List of National Historic Landmarks in New York City
- List of New York City Designated Landmarks in Manhattan below 14th Street
- National Register of Historic Places listings in Manhattan below 14th Street
