= The Martha Mitchell Effect =

2022 short documentary film by Anne Alvergue and Debra McClutchy

- Poster
- Directed by: Anne Alvergue; Debra McClutchy
- Produced by: Beth Levison; Judith Mizrachy
- Starring: Martha Mitchell
- Edited by: Anne Alvergue
- Music by: Nathan Halpern; Robert Pycior; Chris Ruggiero
- Production company: Foothill Productions
- Distributed by: Netflix
- Release date: June 17, 2022
- Running time: 40 minutes
- Country: United States
- Language: English

The Martha Mitchell Effect is an American short documentary film directed by Anne Alvergue and Debra McClutchy. The film was released on June 17, 2022, on Netflix.

== Summary ==
Told through archival footage, its story is centered on Watergate whistleblower Martha Mitchell, a cabinet wife who was gaslit by the Nixon administration in an attempt to keep her silent.

== Accolades ==
It was nominated for Best Documentary Short Film at the 95th Academy Awards.

== Reception ==
On the review aggregator website Rotten Tomatoes, the film has a positive review of 100% based on 5 critics' reviews.
