= Samuel Tredwell Skidmore House =

House in Manhattan, New York

- House at 37 East 4th Street
- U.S. National Register of Historic Places
- New York State Register of Historic Places
- New York City Landmark
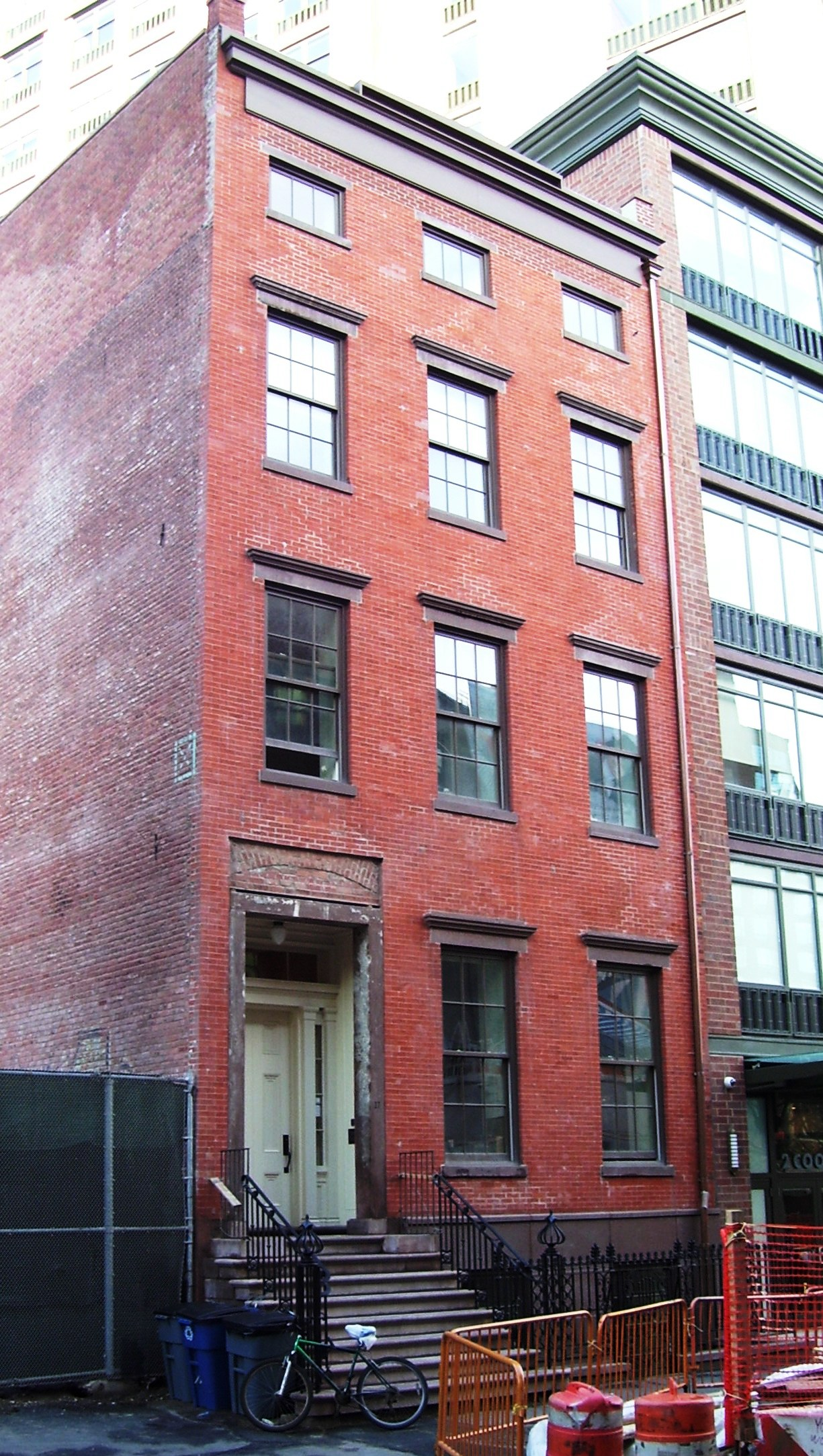

- Location within Manhattan Location within New York City Location within New York Location within the United States
- Interactive map of House at 37 East 4th Street
- Location: 37 East 4th Street, Manhattan, New York, US
- Coordinates: 40°43′39″N 73°59′31″W
- Area: less than one acre
- Built: 1845
- Architectural style: Greek Revival
- NRHP reference No.: 80002695
- NYSRHP No.: 06101.000619
- NYCL No.: 0646

Significant dates
- Added to NRHP: 1980-01-03
- Designated NYSRHP: 1980-06-23
- Designated NYCL: 1970-08-18

The Samuel Tredwell Skidmore House is a house at 37 East Fourth Street in the NoHo neighborhood of Manhattan in New York City, New York, US. The three-and-a-half-story Greek Revival structure was built for the merchant Samuel Tredwell Skidmore. It has a facade divided vertically into three bays, accessed through a stoop. The interior has a gross floor area of 9,620 square feet (894 m^{2}) and is divided into 10 apartments. The building is a New York City designated landmark and on the National Register of Historic Places.

Built on part of the former estate of John Jacob Astor, the house was developed by the firm of T. Thomas & Son and built between 1844 and 1845. Skidmore died in 1881, and his widow sold the property two years later. The interiors were split into apartments in the 20th century and later fell into disrepair, being renovated in 2010.

== Description ==
The Samuel Tredwell Skidmore House is at 37 East Fourth Street in the NoHo neighborhood of Manhattan in New York City. It is on the north side of Fourth Street, between Lafayette Street to the west and Bowery to the east. The Skidmore House occupies a deep, narrow lot, which has 25.75 feet (7.85 m) of frontage on Fourth Street and extends 82 feet (25 m) back from the street. The house itself takes up more of the lot than other New York City houses on similarly-sized lots. Abutting the house to the west is a public park named Manuel Plaza, along with the Merchant's House Museum at 29 East Fourth Street.

The building is a three-and-a-half-story brick house, with three full stories above a raised basement with a rusticated facade. The front facade is divided vertically into three bays. It originally had ironwork similar to that of the Merchant's House Museum, though none of the ironwork is extant. The main entrance is through a stoop, which ascends to a doorway opening flanked by Ionic columns and topped by an entablature. The doorway itself is recessed, with paneling on the side walls of the recess; there are sidelights beside and a transom window above the door, and there was originally a carved molding above the transom window. Within the remainder of the facade, the sills below and lintels above each window are made of stone. There are cap moldings on the third story's lintels. The attic above that story has shorter windows, and the cornice above the facade is made of wood and is undecorated.

The interior has a gross floor area of 9,620 square feet (894 m^{2}). A report from 1980 indicated that some of the original wooden decorations such as floors, a staircase, and molded openings remained in place. These decorations were severely damaged in the 2000s, and by 2010, the interior was divided into 10 apartments. The modern interiors have ceilings measuring 13 feet (4.0 m) high, though the two units in the attic have much lower ceilings. The apartments have distinct layouts; the house's backyard, piazza, and balcony are each part of different apartments.

A Village Voice article from 1994 described the design as "characteristically stolid and handsome", typical of an era where American architects sought classical rather than European architectural influences.

== History ==
=== Development and original use ===
The site was formerly part of the estate of German-American businessman John Jacob Astor, who, in 1803, acquired land between what is now Astor Place and Great Jones Street. In the 1830s, the wealthiest New Yorkers were starting to relocate northward from what is now the Financial District of Manhattan to what is now Lafayette Street in NoHo. At the time, the area surrounding Lafayette Street was still mostly undeveloped. Residential development in the area peaked at that time before moving northward again in the 1840s and 1850s.

The house was developed by the firm of T. Thomas & Son and built for Samuel Tredwell Skidmore, a drug salesman, between 1844 and 1845. At the time, the neighborhood was still upscale, with nearby developments that included William B. Astor's Colonnade Row and the Washington Square Park mansions. His cousin, Seabury Tredwell, resided nearby in what is now the Merchant's House Museum. The house had the address 369 Fourth Street, then 385 Fourth Street, before ultimately being renumbered as 37 East Fourth Street. The Skidmore House was the residence of Skidmore, his wife, eight children, and a nurse for four decades. Skidmore died in 1881, and his widow sold the property in 1883.

=== Later use ===
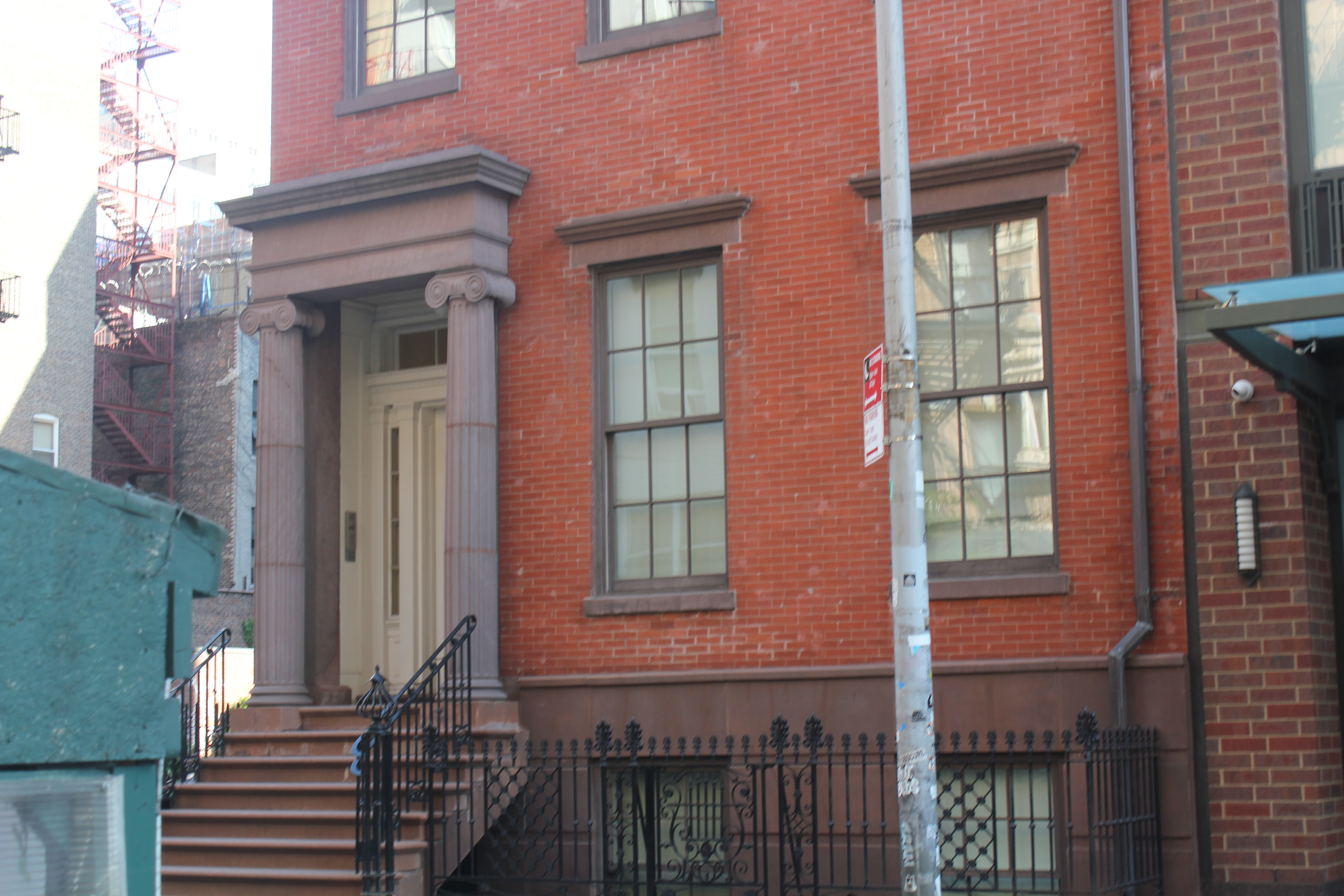
First floor

After Skidmore's death, the interiors were split into apartments. At some point, one of the apartment owners divided the basement into what the Voice described as an "S&M playroom". During the early 20th century, the building was owned by Carlotta M. O'Connor. An agent was appointed to sell it in 1935; later that year, an unidentified buyer acquired the house, with plans to renovate the building and occupy it himself. The estate of Hannah Rosenberg took over the house in 1936 and owned it for three decades. In 1966, the house was sold to Ralph H. Holmes, who wanted to convert two levels into a single unit for his own use, dividing the upper stories into two additional apartments.

The Skidmore House was designated as a New York City landmark in 1970. By that decade, the surrounding section of NoHo had become an enclave of artists, and 37 East Fourth Street was occupied by the artist Poe Kim. It was known as the Touchstone Gallery by 1974, and later in the 1970s, it was taken over by the real-estate developer Sol Goldman, who wanted to erect new development around the house. Goldman demolished three houses to the west with plans to erect retail there. To the east, he demolished a five-story structure, where he planned to build a movie theater and apartment block. Goldman died in 1987, and the Skidmore House became home to a family of squatters, who moved out in 1994 just before the building caught fire, likely via arson. By then, the building was covered in graffiti.

As late as the 1990s, the building retained many of its architectural decorations, but the Skidmore House had fallen into disrepair by the 2000s. The roof partially collapsed in 2002, prompting the city government to file a lawsuit; in the two years that followed, the city government claimed that the collapsed roof caused the interior to deteriorate significantly, with a partly collapsed ceiling, water damage, and buckling floors. New York Supreme Court justice Walter B. Tolub ruled in 2004 that the owners had to repair the structure. Atlantic Development Group, the owner at the time, requested in 2005 that the New York City Landmarks Preservation Commission (LPC) allow an 18-story tower on an adjacent site, but the LPC refused to give permission, saying that the Skidmore House repairs had not been completed.

By 2008, the LPC had given Atlantic permission to construct a residential building at 2 Cooper Square. Since the adjacent site had been zoned for manufacturing uses, the LPC required the developer to restore the Skidmore House in exchange for a zoning variance to allow residential uses at 2 Cooper Square. Initially, the house was intended to be leased out as a single-family residence. The Skidmore House was restored in 2010, and its interior was divided into ten residential units that were incorporated into the 2 Cooper Square development; the other 134 units were in a new building immediately adjoining the old house. The designers restored the Skidmore House based on similar Greek Revival houses in SoHo, Manhattan, and the interiors of the Merchants House Museum.

== See also ==
- List of New York City Designated Landmarks in Manhattan below 14th Street
- National Register of Historic Places in Manhattan below 14th Street
