= Storm Lake (film) =

2021 film by Jerry Risius and Beth Levison

Storm Lake is a 2021 documentary film directed by Jerry Risius and Beth Levison. It covers two years at the family-run newspaper The Storm Lake Times in Storm Lake, Iowa, and features various political figures, including Jill Biden, Pete Buttigieg, Chuck Grassley, Amy Klobuchar, Alexandria Ocasio-Cortez, Bernie Sanders, Elizabeth Warren, Andrew Yang and Julian Castro as well as The Storm Lake Times editors Art, Dolores, John and Mary Cullen.

The film won the 2021 Audience Award for best feature at the American Film Institute's AFI DOCS film festival, and was also nominated for a 2021 Peabody Award.

== Reception ==
On review aggregator website Rotten Tomatoes, the film has an approval rating of 89% based on 18 critics, with an average rating of 7.9/10.

"Storm Lake shows how much [T]he Storm Lake Times and, by extension, its staff care about the well-being and overall representation of the community they're a part of".

David Rooney of The Hollywood Reporter called it "A vital celebration of the role of community-based news gathering at a time when media revenues are way down and the credibility of the press has taken a hammering across much of the country".
