= Drop Dead City =

2024 documentary film

- Film poster
- Directed by: Michael Rohatyn; Peter Yost
- Produced by: Michael Rohatyn; Peter Yost
- Cinematography: Jerry Risius
- Edited by: Anna Auster; Don Kleszy
- Production company: Pangloss Films
- Distributed by: Fear City
- Release dates: November 21, 2024 (DOC NYC); April 25, 2025 (New York City)
- Running time: 103 minutes
- Country: United States
- Language: English
- Box office: $159,523

Drop Dead City is a 2024 American documentary film which details the 1975 New York City fiscal crisis. It was directed by Michael Rohatyn and Peter Yost. It premiered at DOC NYC on November 21, 2024, and was given a theatrical release in New York City on April 25, 2025. The film is named after the infamous Daily News headline, "FORD TO CITY: DROP DEAD".

== Reception ==
On the review aggregator website Rotten Tomatoes, 92% of 12 critics' reviews are positive, with an average rating of 6.3/10. Metacritic, which uses a weighted average, assigned the film a score of 67 out of 100, based on four critics, indicating "generally favorable" reviews.

Owen Gleiberman of Variety wrote that the film is "wonkish but gripping."

Jason Bailey of RogerEbert.com gave it two and a half out of four stars, writing, "The filmmaking isn't exactly groundbreaking, but it doesn't need to be; the archival footage is splendid, blending contemporary newscasts, documentary footage, and interviews with commentary from reporters, historians, politicians, and artists."
