= Ford to City: Drop Dead =

1975 New York Daily News headline

The New York Daily News ran the headline after President Gerald Ford said he would veto any bailout of New York City.

On October 30, 1975, the New York Daily News ran the headline "Ford to City: Drop Dead", following a speech by President Gerald Ford, in which he refused to provide federal aid for New York City, which was in the midst of a fiscal crisis. Despite Ford never actually saying the words "drop dead", there was a swift backlash, leading to Ford approving $2.3 billion in loans to the city within a few months. Ford later blamed the headline for causing him to lose the 1976 presidential election. It remains as one of the most famous Daily News headlines and continues to be parodied and reused.

== Speech and headline ==
After years of deficit spending, New York City was on the brink of bankruptcy. State efforts to avert a default were insufficient, and officials began to look to the federal government for relief. On October 29, Ford gave a 35-minute speech to the National Press Club in Washington, D.C., that blamed the city's fiscal crisis on city officials, who he said were afflicted by a "insidious disease". Ford stated he would veto any federal aid to bail out the city.

William J. Brink, an editor at the Daily News, proposed the headline "Drop Dead" despite Ford never having said those words. Earlier suggestions included "FORD REFUSES AID TO CITY" and "FORD SAYS NO TO CITY AID".

== Legacy ==
Ford later said the headline was unfair, because he never said the specific words "drop dead". He credited the headline with costing him New York state in the 1976 presidential election, tipping the presidency to Jimmy Carter.

The headline has been described as one of the most famous Daily News headlines. Many other news publications have reused the headline; for example, at the start of the COVID-19 pandemic, The New York Times ran an opinion piece titled, "Trump to City: Drop Dead".

The Daily News itself reused the headline in 2017, after President Donald Trump withdrew the United States from the Paris Agreement: "TRUMP TO WORLD: DROP DEAD". Editor-in-chief Arthur Browne said that others had proposed reusing the headline before, but those events did not rise to the necessary "momentous" level.

Writing for The New Republic, Eileen Markey described the headline as evoking "a mood of disaster and failure", and that it "captured a visceral feeling—a sense that New York was doomed".

A documentary about New York City's 1975 fiscal crisis was named Drop Dead City, after the headline.

In 2026, New York City mayor Zohran Mamdani met with President Trump for the second time, bringing the president a mock Daily News front page with the headline "Trump to City: Let's Build". The subheading read "Backs new era of housing / Trump delivers 12,000+ homes, most since 1973". The mayor's press secretary Joe Calvello confirmed that this gift was meant to encourage the president to fund a 12,000-unit affordable housing development in the city, which he said the president was "very enthusiastic" about. Trump and Mamdani posed for a photo, with the president smiling and holding both the original headline and the mock one created by the mayor's office.
