= A Photographic Memory =

2024 American documentary film

- Film poster
- Directed by: Rachel Elizabeth Seed
- Written by: Rachel Elizabeth Seed; Christopher Stoudt
- Produced by: Rachel Elizabeth Seed; Sigrid Dyekjær; Matt Perniciaro; Michael Sherman; Beth Levison; Danielle Varga
- Cinematography: Joseph Michael Lopez; Rachel Elizabeth Seed; Drew Gardner
- Edited by: Christopher Stoudt; Eileen Meyer; Tyler Hubby; Will Garafolo
- Music by: Mary Lattimore
- Production companies: Real Lava; Capariva Films; Bow & Arrow Entertainment; Chicken & Egg Films; Spark Features; Facet; Hazel Pictures
- Distributed by: Zeitgeist Films; Kino Lorber
- Release date: March 1, 2024 (True/False)
- Running time: 87 minutes
- Country: United States
- Language: English
- Box office: $28,965

A Photographic Memory is a 2024 American documentary film, directed, written, and produced by Elizabeth Rachel Seed. It follows Seed as she attempts to piece together a portrait of her mother, journalist, Sheila Turner-Seed.

It had its world premiere at the True/False Film Festival on March 1, 2024.

== Premise ==
Rachel Elizabeth Seed attempts to piece together a portrait of her mother, journalist, Sheila Turner-Seed, who died unexpectedly when she was eighteen months old. Uncovering her archive filled with interviews of Henri Cartier-Bresson, Lisette Model, Gordon Parks, W. Eugene Smith, Roman Vishniac, Cornell Capa and Bruce Davidson, immersing Seed into her world.

== Release ==
It had its world premiere at the True/False Film Festival on March 1, 2024. It also screened at the Full Frame Documentary Film Festival, Hot Docs Canadian International Documentary Festival, and DOC NYC. In March 2025, Zeitgeist Films and Kino Lorber acquired distribution rights to the film.

== Reception ==
On the review aggregator website Rotten Tomatoes, 100% of 18 critics' reviews are positive. Metacritic, which uses a weighted average, assigned the film a score of 90 out of 100, based on four critics, indicating "universal acclaim".
