= Beth Levison =

American documentary film producer and director

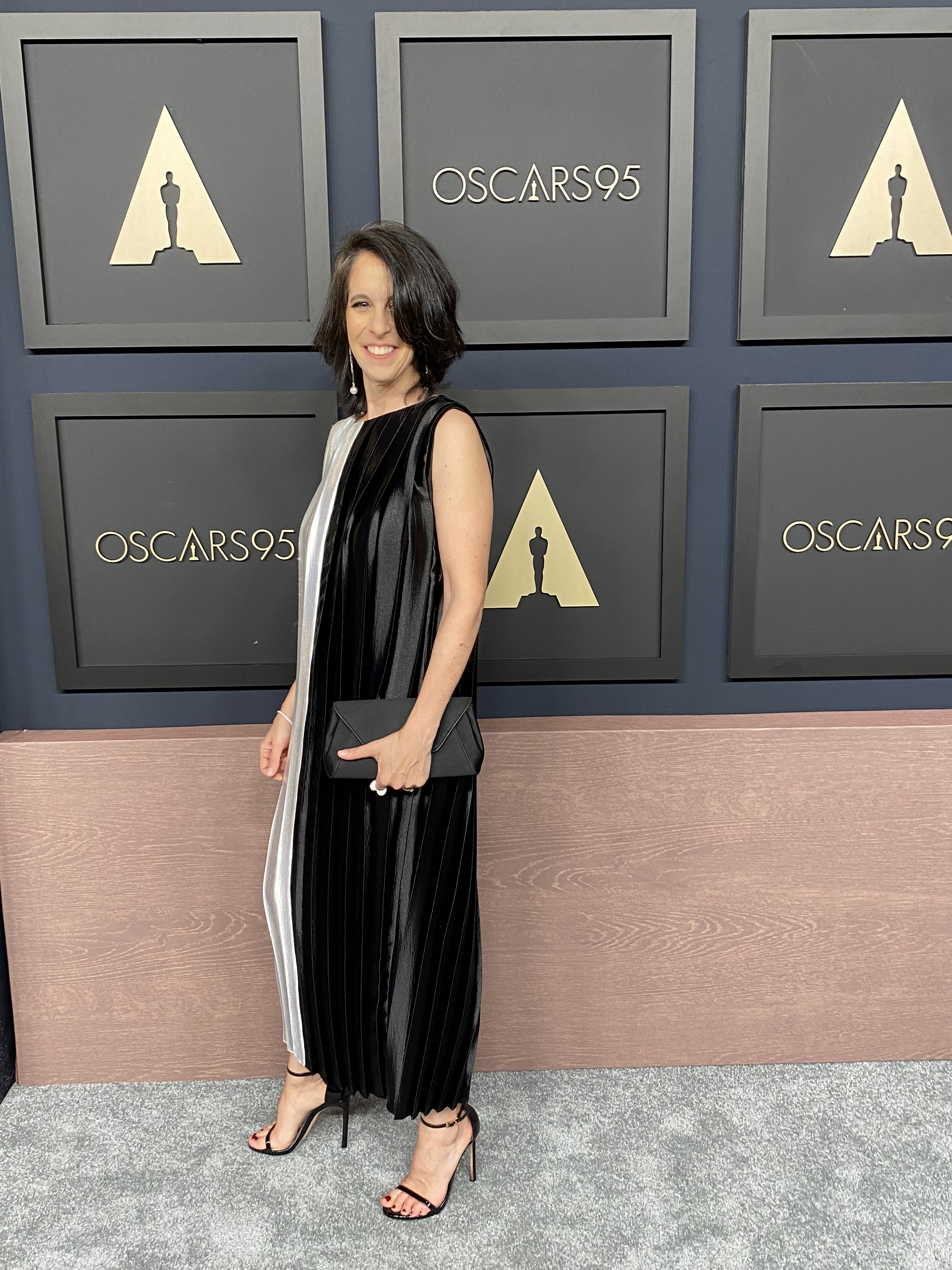
- Beth Levison at the Academy Awards, 2023
- Born: Pittsfield, Massachusetts, U.S.
- Occupation(s): Producer, director
- Years active: 1993–present
- Spouse: Henry Sidel

Beth Levison is an Academy Award-nominated American independent documentary film producer and director based in New York City. Previously, she had a career in unscripted television.

== Life and career ==
Levison was born in Pittsfield, Massachusetts and went to Middlebury College.

Her most recently-completed producing effort, A Photographic Memory, won the 2025 Independent Spirits: Truer Than Fiction Award and was acquired for distribution by Kino Lorber. Previous to that, she produced The Martha Mitchell Effect, about Watergate whistleblower and Republican cabinet wife Martha Mitchell, which premiered at the 2022 Sundance Film Festival, launched on Netflix, and was nominated for a 2023 Academy Award (Best Documentary Short category). Storm Lake, which she directed alongside DP Jerry Risius and also produced, premiered at the Full Frame Documentary Film Festival, broadcast on PBS’s Independent Lens in 2022, and was nominated for a Peabody Award and a 2022 News and Documentary Emmy Award. Her other producing credits include Women in Blue (Independent Lens, 2021), News and Documentary Emmy-nominated Made in Boise (Independent Lens, 2020), News and Documentary Emmy-nominated Personal Statement (PBS, 2018), and 32 Pills: My Sister’s Suicide (HBO, 2017).

Her executive producer credits include Land with No Rider, which premiered at the 2025 True/False Film Festival, the two-time British Independent Film Award winner Grand Theft Hamlet (2024) now streaming on MUBI, My Sweet Land (2024) and With Peter Bradley (Slamdance 2023).

Levison is the founder of Hazel Pictures and the co-founder of the Documentary Producers Alliance. She is a member of the Academy of Motion Picture Arts and Sciences, was producing faculty with the School of Visual Arts’ Social Documentary Film Program from 2014-2020, and currently teaches as guest faculty at Sarah Lawrence College.

== Selected filmography ==
| Year | Title | Contribution | Note |
|---|---|---|---|
| 2025 | Land with No Rider | Executive producer | Documentary |
| 2024 | Corridors of Power: Should America Police the World? | Line producer | Documentary Series |
| 2024 | After the Deluge | Executive producer | Short film |
| 2024 | My Sweet Land | Executive producer | Documentary |
| 2024 | Grand Theft Hamlet | Executive producer | Documentary |
| 2024 | A Photographic Memory | Producer | Documentary |
| 2023 | With Peter Bradley | Consulting producer | Documentary |
| 2022 | The Martha Mitchell Effect | Producer | Documentary |
| 2021 | Storm Lake | Director and producer | Documentary |
| 2021 | Women in Blue | Producer | Documentary |
| 2021 | Charm Circle | Consulting producer | Documentary |
| 2019 | Made in Boise | Producer | Documentary |
| 2019 | The Boxers of Brule | Consulting producer | Documentary |
| 2019 | Cooked: Survival by Zip Code | Consulting producer | Documentary |
| 2018 | In the Land of Pomegranates | Consulting producer | Documentary |
| 2018 | Personal Statement | Co-producer | Documentary |
| 2017 | 32 Pills: My Sister's Suicide | Producer | Documentary |
| 2015 | The Trials of Spring | Producer | Documentary |
| 2012 | Marina Abramovic: The Artist Is Present | Consulting producer | Documentary |
| 2011 | Lemon | Director and producer | Documentary |

== Awards and nominations ==
| Year | Result | Award | Category | Work | Ref. |
|---|---|---|---|---|---|
| 2023 | Nominated | Academy Awards | Best Documentary Short Film | The Martha Mitchell Effect | |
| 2021 | Won | AFI Docs Festival | Audience Award | Storm Lake | |
| 2021 | Won | Provincetown International Film Festival | NYWIFT Award | Storm Lake | |
| 2021 | Won | Woodstock Film Festival | Best Documentary Feature | Storm Lake | |
| 2012 | Won | Oaxaca FilmFest | Best Documentary Feature | Lemon | |
| 2012 | Nominated | Miami Film Festival | Best Documentary Feature | Lemon | |
| 2011 | Won | Zurich Film Festival | International Documentary Film | Lemon | |
| 2011 | Nominated | Doc NYC | Special Jury Prize | Lemon | |
| 2011 | Won | Primetime Emmy Awards | Outstanding Children's Program | A Child's Garden of Poetry | |
| 2006 | Nominated | Primetime Emmy Awards | Outstanding Children's Program | Classical Baby | |
| 2005 | Won | Primetime Emmy Awards | Outstanding Children's Program | Classical Baby | |
