= 1975 New York City fiscal crisis =

In 1975, New York City had a severe fiscal crisis after accumulating $14 billion of debt, of which $6 billion was short-term debt. The city ran out of money in its budget, and had an operating deficit of more than $600 million, with some estimates placing the deficit at $2.2 billion. The city had a credit rating that excluded it from the credit markets.

The crisis was part of the 1973–75 recession. It was rooted in the large era of municipal borrowing during the 1960s. By the mid-1970s, New York City's government had large deficits. Despite large cutbacks to public services and en-masse firings of municipal employees, the city could not pay off the debts it had accrued, and almost defaulted by October 1975. A Municipal Assistance Corporation, and later an Emergency Financial Control Board, were formed to deal with the crisis. By 1976, the city had paid off its short-term debt, and the crisis was considered resolved by the early 1980s.

== Background ==
=== Excessive borrowing ===
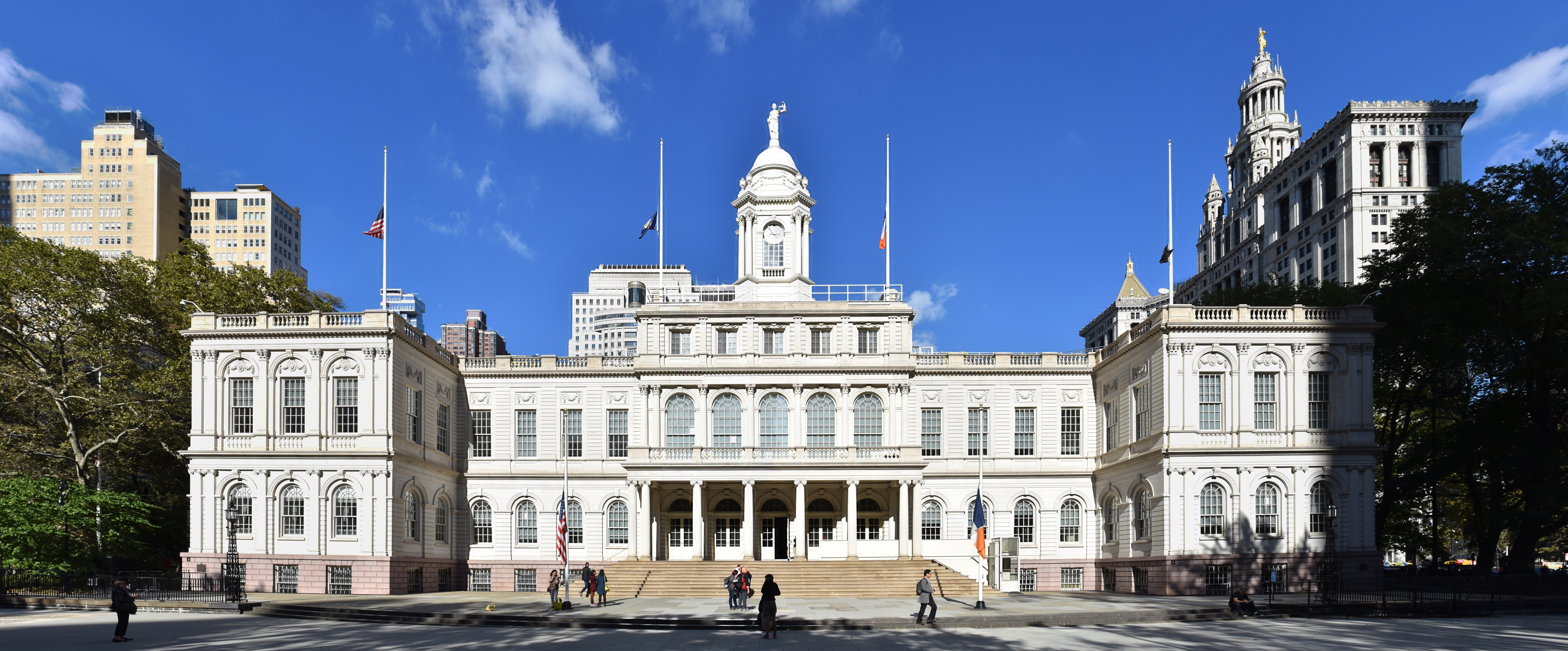
New York City Hall. Before the fiscal crisis, municipal employment increased even as employment in other sectors had declined significantly.

The city started running an operating deficit in 1961 under the tenure of Mayor Robert F. Wagner Jr.. In response to strike actions by municipal employees, Wagner tried to appease them and salvage his own political reputation by spending funds at the expense of the municipal budget. Simultaneously, property taxes were lowered due to rent control laws, which caused municipal funds to be depleted faster than the property taxes could replenish the fund. In 1965, the city elected John Lindsay as mayor, and he borrowed at large scale in order to improve city services. State aid, federal aid, and predictions of high tax revenues concealed the borrowing. The city's reliance on federal aid more than quadrupled from 1961 to 1973, but federal money for such programs was rapidly dwindling after the end of the Great Society programs.

An earlier fiscal crisis in 1966 had prompted the city to enact Keynesian measures—i.e., increasing spending to spur economic activity. The city financed an extensive network of social safety nets, including free college at the City University of New York and low-cost transit. Previous attempts to reduce these benefits had resulted in riots, as in 1971, when residents of Brownsville, Brooklyn, rioted after hearing of a proposed 10% decrease to welfare benefits.

=== Employment decreases ===
US economic stagnation in the 1970s hit New York City particularly hard, amplified by a large movement of middle-class residents to the suburbs, which drained the city of tax revenue. During the 1970s, eight hundred thousand people moved out of the city, continuing a trend of white flight that had occurred during the 1960s, when a million white people had moved out. Simultaneously, hundreds of thousands of mostly-minority residents had moved in. Hundreds of thousands of jobs in New York City were eliminated in the third quarter of the 20th century, including about 50% of the city's manufacturing jobs and about 60% of apparel jobs. About 600,000 jobs in the city disappeared between 1969 and 1976, representing more than double the number of jobs that the city's economy had added since 1950. The loss was driven by a decrease of 300,000 manufacturing jobs during that period, at a time when manufacturing made up three of every ten jobs in the city. The city's transportation and securities industries also saw heavy job losses, each shedding about one-third of their positions. With the start of the 1973–1975 recession, unemployment in New York City increased more rapidly than in other parts of the US.

Another contributing factor were extensive benefits for municipal staff, which had been granted to various city government departments to avert further strikes. Municipal employment had increased over the years while employment in other sectors declined sharply, and "service, government, and financial" jobs made up 46% of the city's total employment by 1968, up from 35% in 1950. The city had overly optimistic forecasts of revenues, underfunding of pensions, use of capital expenditures for operating costs, and poor budgetary and accounting practices. The city government was reluctant to confront municipal labor unions; an announced "hiring freeze" was followed by an increase in city payrolls of 13,000 people in one quarter, and an announced layoff of eight thousand workers resulted in only 436 employees leaving the city government. In a 1974 book, Syracuse University professor Alan K. Campbell claimed that municipal worker benefits and rapidly increasing inflation were already causing expenses to exceed $10 billion a year.

== Running out of money ==
By April 1975, during the term of Mayor Abraham Beame, New York City ran out of money. The city could not pay for normal operating expenses, was unable to borrow more, and faced the prospect of defaulting on its obligations and declaring bankruptcy. The city admitted an operating deficit of at least $600 million, though the actual total city debt was more than $11 billion and the city was unable to borrow money from the credit markets. The New York State Labor Department projected that by the end of the decade, 313,000 jobs would have been eliminated from the city's economy.

== Municipal Assistance Corporation ==
State Governor Hugh Carey proposed lending money to New York City on the condition that the city's financial operations were placed under state control. The first solution proposed was the Municipal Assistance Corporation, which tried to pool the city's money and refinance its heavy debts. It was established on June 10, 1975, with Felix Rohatyn as chairman, and a board of nine prominent citizens. In the meanwhile, the crisis continued to worsen, with the admitted city deficit reaching $750 million; municipal bonds could be sold only at a significant loss to the underwriters.

The MAC insisted that the city make major reforms, including a wage freeze, a major layoff, a subway fare hike, and charging tuition at the City University of New York. The New York State Legislature supported the MAC by passing a law converting the city sales tax and stock transfer tax into state taxes, which when collected were then used as security for the MAC bonds. The State of New York also passed a state law that created an Emergency Financial Control Board to monitor the city's finances, required the city to balance its budget within three years, and required the city to follow accepted accounting practices. But even with all of these measures, the value of the MAC bonds dropped in price, and the city struggled to find the money to pay its employees and stay in operation. The MAC sold off $10 billion in bonds.

By September 1975, New York City's municipal bond yields had reached their all-time high due to low demand, and other American cities' bond issues were being affected because many potential investors were reluctant to enter the municipal bond market at all. The fiscal crisis had also become a campaign issue in other states' elections. American investors, wary of investing in New York City commodity markets, turned overseas. U.S. President Gerald Ford, who refused repeated requests to give the city financial assistance, suggested that the city raise sales taxes. U.S. Senator James L. Buckley also opposed a federal bailout.

== Emergency Financial Control Board ==
On September 9, 1975, Governor Carey signed a bill giving the city a $2.3 billion lifeline, enough to subsidize the city for three months. In exchange, the city agreed to hand over control of its budget to the Emergency Financial Control Board (EFCB), a state agency. The EFCB first met two days later, September 11. The seven-member board was composed of two city officials, two state officials, and three non-political appointees of the state; the non-political appointees' positions were filled by business executives from outside the financial sector. The EFCB's first formal act was to calculate the city's budget, which for fiscal year 1976 was estimated at $11.6 billion.

=== October 1975 near-bankruptcy ===
The city was ordered to institute budget cuts totaling $200 million by October 17, 1975, and the MAC had to redeem $453 million in short-term debt securities two days later. On October 16, a day before the deadline, Beame ordered that funds for the under-construction Jacob K. Javits Convention Center, a major redevelopment project in western Midtown Manhattan, be frozen. Funds for other major projects such as schools were also frozen, and 125 bureaucrats were ordered to auction their city-owned cars. With the city having exhausted every other possible alternative, the MAC asked the city's teachers' union to provide a $150 million loan from its pension fund so the city could meet its obligation for the next month. The pension fund's trustees convened a meeting that lasted until midnight, but could not agree to loan the $150 million. They did agree to another meeting with the mayor at 7 a.m. the next day.

In a drastic attempt to avoid default, Beame's office contacted Ford's office, and Ravitch negotiated with the teachers' union president, Albert Shanker, all night long without success. Beame drafted a statement that ready to be released at 4 p.m. on October 17. "I have been advised by the comptroller that the City of New York has insufficient cash on hand to meet debt obligations due today," the statement said. "This constitutes the default that we have struggled to avoid." The Beame statement was never distributed because at 2:07 p.m. on that day, Shanker finally furnished $150 million from the union's pension fund to buy Municipal Assistance Corporation bonds.

=== Approval of EFCB financial plan ===
The EFCB approved the Three-Year Financial Plan for New York City on October 20, 1975, which called for significant spending cuts and tax increases. For example, municipal employees had to fund increasing shares of their own pensions, while public funding for programs such as day care and senior centers were cut. The board suggested pausing or canceling numerous capital projects, including infrastructure and schools already under construction.

Local banks, labor unions, and the city government ratified this plan on November 14. By then, the fiscal crisis had prompted a statewide suspension of financing for housing developments. The EFCB made drastic cuts in municipal services and spending, cut city employment, froze salaries and raised bus and subway fares. The level of welfare spending was cut. Some hospitals were closed as were some branch libraries and fire stations. The labor unions helped out, by allocating much of their pension funds to the purchase of city bonds—putting the pensions at risk if bankruptcy took place.

== Congressional intervention ==
On October 29, 1975, President Ford announced that he would refuse to grant the city a bailout. The New York Daily News ran a front-page headline the next day, entitled "Ford to City: Drop Dead", although he had never actually said these words verbatim. After Carey requested a 90-day federal loan in early November, Ford said he would veto any such loan, even as the state legislature failed to approve a package to keep New York City solvent. Several presidential advisers wanted the city to overhaul its pension system before they were willing to provide assistance.

Ford later signed the New York City Seasonal Financing Act of 1975, a Congressional bill that extended $2.3 billion worth of federal loans to the city for three years; the loans were repaid with interest. In return, Congress ordered the city to increase charges for city services, cancel a wage increase for city employees, and drastically reduce its workforce. Rohatyn and the MAC directors persuaded the banks to defer the maturity of the bonds they held and to accept less interest. They also persuaded the city and state employee pension funds to buy MAC bonds to pay off the city's debts. The city government cut its number of employees by 40,000, deferred wage increases already agreed in contracts and kept them below the level of inflation.

== Resolution and aftermath ==
A fiscal conservative, Democrat Ed Koch, was elected as mayor in 1977. He had also run on an anti-crime platform following that year's blackout, winning much of the vote from minorities and liberals. By 1977–78, New York City had eliminated its short-term debt. By 1985, the City no longer needed the support of the Municipal Assistance Corporation, which voted itself out of existence.

== Legacy ==
The fiscal crisis inspired the 1985 book Political Crisis/Fiscal Crisis: The Collapse and Revival of New York City and Kim Phillips-Fein's 2017 book Fear City: New York's Fiscal Crisis and the Rise of Austerity Politics. The Daily News headline "Ford to City: Drop Dead" itself gained fame; a documentary about the fiscal crisis was named Drop Dead City, after the headline.

== Sources ==
- Dunstan, Roger (March 1, 1995). "Overview of New York City's Fiscal Crisis" (PDF). California Research Bureau, California State Library. Archived from the original (PDF) on January 25, 2011.
- "New York City's Economy - A Perspective on its Problems" (PDF). FRBNY Quarterly Review. Federal Reserve Bank of New York. Summer 1977.
- Phillips-Fein, Kim (April 18, 2017). Fear City: New York's Fiscal Crisis and the Rise of Austerity Politics. Henry Holt and Company. ISBN 978-0-8050-9525-8.
- Reagan, Michael (August 11, 2017). Capital City: New York in Fiscal Crisis, 1966-1978 (PhD thesis). University of Washington.
- Schlosstein, Ralph L. (November 3, 1975). New York City's Financial Crisis : An Evaluation of Its Economic Impact and of Proposed Policy Solutions: A Study Prepared for the Use of the Joint Economic Committee (PDF) (Report).
