= Astor Place station =

New York City Subway station in Manhattan

Astor Place
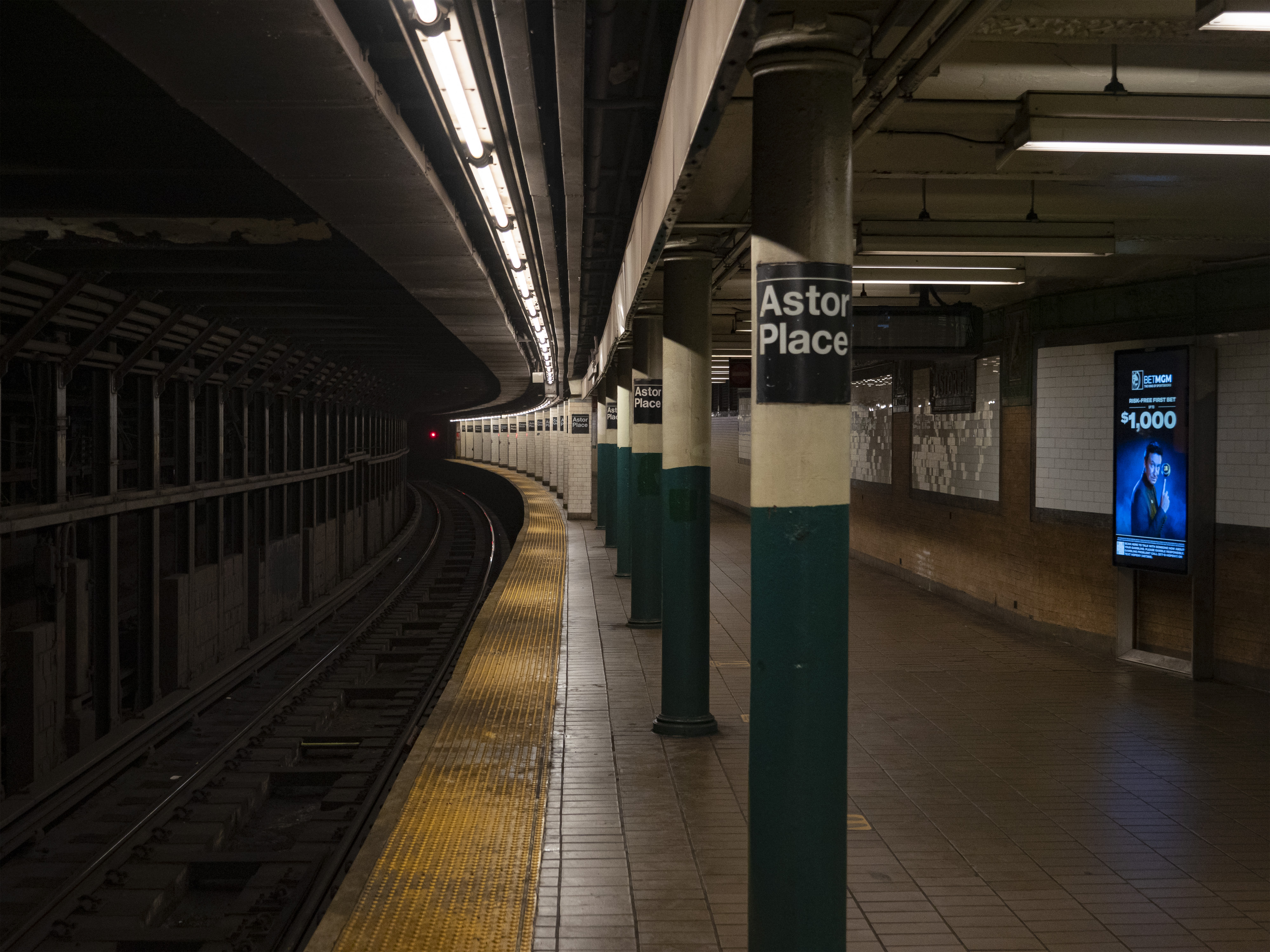
- Southbound platform

Station statistics
- Address: Astor Place & Lafayette Street; New York, New York
- Borough: Manhattan
- Locale: NoHo / East Village
- Coordinates: 40°43′47″N 73°59′30″W
- Division: A (IRT)
- Line: IRT Lexington Avenue Line
- Services: 4 (late nights); 6 (all times) <6> (weekdays until 8:45 p.m., peak direction)
- Transit: NYCT Bus: M1, M2, M3, M8
- Structure: Underground
- Platforms: 2 side platforms
- Tracks: 4

Other information
- Opened: October 27, 1904 (122 years ago)
- Former/other names: Astor Place–Cooper Union; Cooper Union

Traffic
- 2025: 4,083,343 ▲0.8%
- Rank: 84 out of 423
Services
| Preceding station | New York City Subway | Following station |
|---|---|---|
| 14th Street–Union Square 4 6 <6> toward Pelham Bay Park | Local | Bleecker Street 4 6 <6> toward Brooklyn Bridge–City Hall |
does not stop here
Location
Location within New York City Subway
Location within New York City
Location within New York
Track layout
Street map
Station service legend
| Symbol | Description |
| Stops all times | Stops all times |
| Stops late nights only | Stops late nights only |
| Stops rush hours in the peak direction only | Stops rush hours in the peak direction only |
- Astor Place Subway Station (IRT)
- U.S. National Register of Historic Places
- New York State Register of Historic Places
- New York City Landmark
- MPS: New York City Subway System MPS
- NRHP reference No.: 04001013
- NYSRHP No.: 06101.015015
- NYCL No.: 1096

Significant dates
- Added to NRHP: September 17, 2004
- Designated NYSRHP: July 20, 2004
- Designated NYCL: October 23, 1979

The Astor Place station (signed as Astor Place–Cooper Union) is a local station on the IRT Lexington Avenue Line of the New York City Subway. Located at Fourth Avenue, Cooper Square, and Astor Place between the East Village and NoHo, it is served by 6 trains at all times, <6> trains during weekdays in the peak direction, and 4 trains during late night hours.

The Astor Place station was constructed for the Interborough Rapid Transit Company (IRT) as part of the city's first subway line, which was approved in 1900. Construction of the line segment that includes the Astor Place station started on September 12 of the same year. The station opened on October 27, 1904, as one of the original 28 stations of the New York City Subway. The station's platforms were lengthened in the late 1950s, and the station was renovated in the mid-1980s.

The Astor Place station contains two side platforms and four tracks; express trains use the inner two tracks to bypass the station. The station was built with tile and mosaic decorations. The platforms contain exits to Astor Place and are not connected to each other within fare control. The original station interior is a New York City designated landmark and listed on the National Register of Historic Places.

== History ==
=== Construction and opening ===
Planning for a subway line in New York City dates to 1864. However, development of what would become the city's first subway line did not start until 1894, when the New York State Legislature passed the Rapid Transit Act. The subway plans were drawn up by a team of engineers led by William Barclay Parsons, the Rapid Transit Commission's chief engineer. It called for a subway line from New York City Hall in lower Manhattan to the Upper West Side, where two branches would lead north into the Bronx. A plan was formally adopted in 1897, and all legal conflicts over the route alignment were resolved near the end of 1899. The Rapid Transit Construction Company, organized by John B. McDonald and funded by August Belmont Jr., signed the initial Contract 1 with the Rapid Transit Commission in February 1900, in which it would construct the subway and maintain a 50-year operating lease from the opening of the line. In 1901, the firm of Heins & LaFarge was hired to design the underground stations. Belmont incorporated the Interborough Rapid Transit Company (IRT) in April 1902 to operate the subway.

The Astor Place station was constructed as part of the route segment from Great Jones Street to 41st Street. Construction on this section of the line began on September 12, 1900. The section from Great Jones Street to a point 100 feet (30 m) north of 33rd Street was awarded to Holbrook, Cabot & Daly Contracting Company. In the vicinity of the Astor Place station, the subway was to run under Lafayette Street, a new thoroughfare constructed between 1897 and 1905. This involved widening, connecting, and renaming two formerly unconnected streets: Elm Street, which ran south of Houston Street, and Lafayette Place, which ran north of Great Jones Street to an intersection with Astor Place. The southward extension of Lafayette Street and the construction of the subway required the demolition or underpinning of several buildings in the street's path. This resulted in the creation of narrow land lots on either side of Lafayette Street between Houston and Great Jones Streets, slightly south of the Astor Place station's site. By late 1903, the subway was nearly complete, but the IRT Powerhouse and the system's electrical substations were still under construction, delaying the system's opening. As late as October 26, 1904, the day before the subway was scheduled to open, the wall on the southbound platform next to the Wanamaker's store was incomplete.

The Astor Place station opened on October 27, 1904, as one of the original 28 stations of the New York City Subway from City Hall to 145th Street on the Broadway–Seventh Avenue Line. The opening of the first subway line, and particularly the Astor Place station, helped contribute to more development in the East Village; while the neighborhood was already densely populated at the time, the new subway provided connections to other parts of the city. After the first subway line was completed in 1908, the station was served by local trains along both the West Side (now the Broadway–Seventh Avenue Line to Van Cortlandt Park–242nd Street) and East Side (now the Lenox Avenue Line). West Side local trains had their southern terminus at City Hall during rush hours and South Ferry at other times, and had their northern terminus at 242nd Street. East Side local trains ran from City Hall to Lenox Avenue (145th Street).

=== Service changes and station renovations ===
==== 1900s to 1930s ====
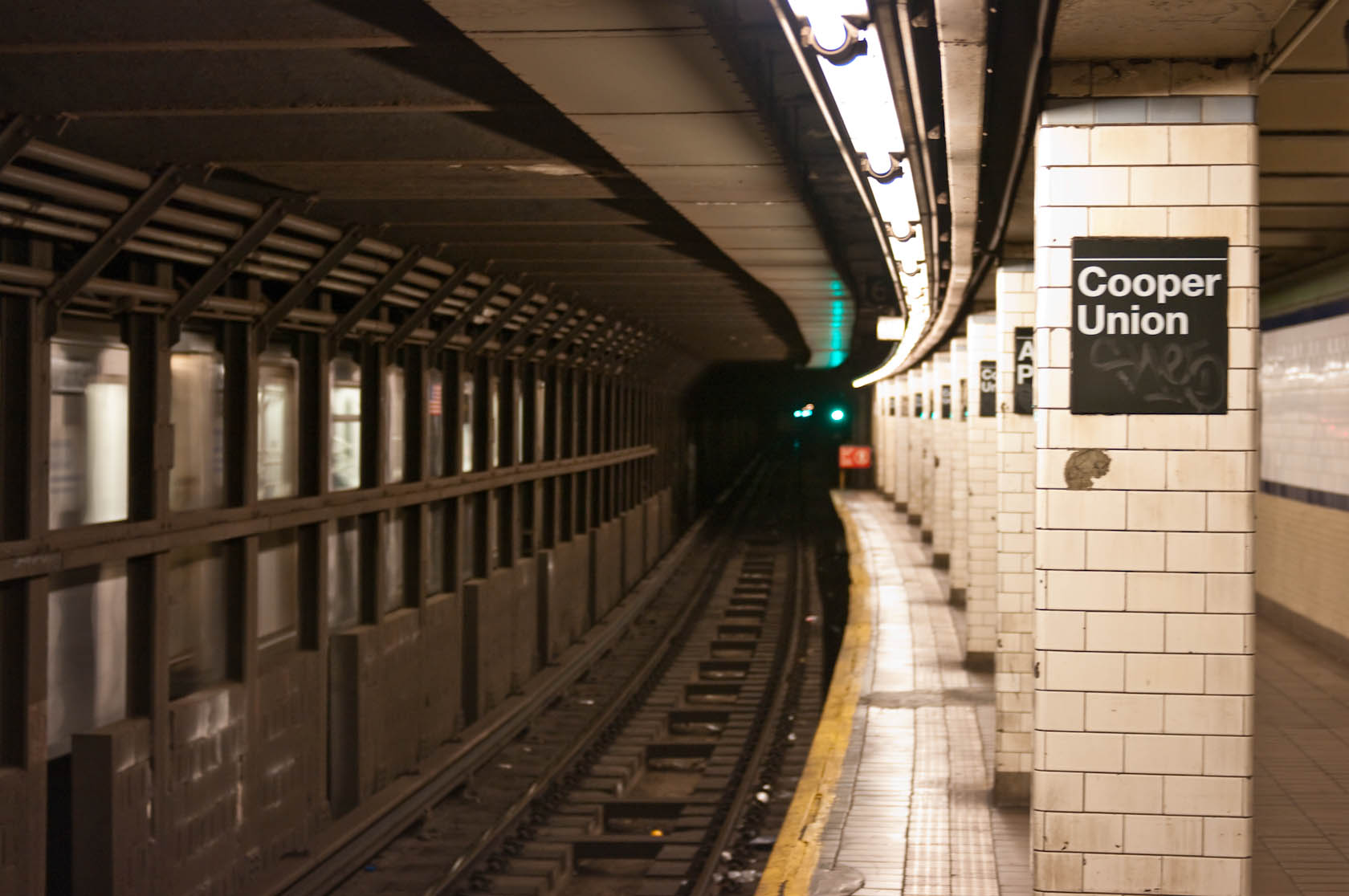
Columns with alternating Astor Place and Cooper Union sign plates

Plans for the Hudson and Manhattan Railroad (H&M; now PATH), devised in the first decade of the 20th century, included a spur from the Uptown Hudson Tubes along Ninth Street to the Astor Place station. At the time, the Uptown Tubes between New Jersey and Manhattan had been under construction intermittently since 1874. By 1904, William Gibbs McAdoo was given the rights to complete the Uptown Tubes. As part of the plan, he would retain perpetual rights to build and operate an east–west crosstown line under Christopher Street and Ninth Street eastward to either Second Avenue or Astor Place, with no intermediate stops. Although the Uptown Tubes opened to 33rd Street in 1908, work on the Ninth Street spur stalled. By 1914, the Rapid Transit Commissioners had determined that the spur was unlikely to be built soon, so permission to build the Ninth Street tunnel was denied.

To address overcrowding, in 1909, the New York Public Service Commission proposed lengthening the platforms at stations along the original IRT subway. As part of a modification to the IRT's construction contracts made on January 18, 1910, the company was to lengthen station platforms to accommodate ten-car express and six-car local trains. In addition to $1.5 million (equivalent to $51.8 million in 2025) spent on platform lengthening, $500,000 (equivalent to $17.3 million in 2025) was spent on building additional entrances and exits. It was anticipated that these improvements would increase capacity by 25 percent. The northbound platform at the Astor Place station was extended 10 feet (3.0 m) in either direction, while the southbound platform was not lengthened. Six-car local trains began operating in October 1910. The Lexington Avenue Line opened north of Grand Central–42nd Street in 1918, and the original line was divided into an H-shaped system. All local trains were sent via the Lexington Avenue Line, running along the Pelham Line in the Bronx.

In December 1922, the Transit Commission approved a $3 million project to lengthen platforms at 14 local stations along the original IRT line, including Astor Place and seven other stations on the Lexington Avenue Line. Platform lengths at these stations would be increased from 225 to 436 feet (69 to 133 m). The commission postponed the platform-lengthening project in September 1923, at which point the cost had risen to $5.6 million.

==== 1940s to 1960s ====
The city government took over the IRT's operations on June 12, 1940. After the closure of the Wanamaker's department store in 1954, the northern building of the two-building complex was sold off and demolished. In July 1956, a fire gutted the building while it was being destroyed. When the fire was being extinguished, some water pooled in the basement and into a subterranean river parallel to the tracks, a likely tributary of Minetta Creek. In the aftermath, the Astor Place station was flooded, causing service to be rerouted for one week. The flood undermined the existing track bed, which was composed of a foot of concrete above a layer of earth. As a result, 275 yards (251 m) of new concrete track beds had to be installed. The repairs cost roughly $250,000.

In November 1959, the Warshaw Construction Company received a contract to remove fifteen entrance/exit kiosks on IRT lines, including two at the Astor Place station. This was part of a citywide initiative to remove the kiosks, which obstructed motorists' views of pedestrians. Also in late 1959, contracts were awarded to extend the platforms at Bowling Green, Wall Street, Fulton Street, Canal Street, Spring Street, Bleecker Street, Astor Place, Grand Central–42nd Street, 86th Street, and 125th Street to 525 feet (160 m). In April 1960, work began on a $3,509,000 project (equivalent to $38.2 million in 2025) to lengthen platforms at seven of these stations to accommodate ten-car trains. The northbound platforms at Canal Street, Spring Street, Bleecker Street, and Astor Place were lengthened from 225 to 525 feet (69 to 160 m); the platform extensions at these stations opened on February 19, 1962.

==== 1970s to present ====
In 1979, the New York City Landmarks Preservation Commission designated the space within the boundaries of the original station, excluding expansions made after 1904, as a city landmark. The station was designated along with eleven others on the original IRT. The original interiors were listed on the National Register of Historic Places in 2004.

The Metropolitan Transportation Authority (MTA) listed the station among the 69 most deteriorated stations in the subway system in 1981. This led residents to create the Committee for Astor Place to raise money for restoration of the station. In 1981, the MTA announced the creation of its Culture Stations program to install public art in the subway. The Culture Stations program was started to deter graffiti, and was inspired by legislation in the New York City Council that mandated that 1% of the cost of constructing public buildings be used for art. The program was modeled on the Louvre – Rivoli station on the Paris Métro, which featured reproductions of the artwork on display in the Louvre. Four stations, namely Astor Place, Eastern Parkway–Brooklyn Museum, 66th Street–Lincoln Center, and Fifth Avenue/53rd Street, were selected for the program due to their proximity to cultural institutions. These would be among the first stations in the MTA's new station refurbishment program, which began in 1982. Initially, there was funding only for the Astor Place and Fifth Avenue/53rd Street stations.

By 1982, the Astor Place station was planned to be renovated for $2.25 million. As part of the Adopt-a-Station program, which sought to renovate some of the subway's most deteriorated stations, the Chemical Bank sponsored a $2.5 million renovation for the station (equivalent to $7.7 million in 2025), while the Committee for Astor Place cosponsored the project. Other sources of funding included $600,000 from the Federal Urban Mass Transit Administration, as well as $125,000 from private sources such as the Vincent Astor Foundation. The firm of Prentice & Chan, Ohlhausen was hired to renovate the platforms. Rolf Ohlhausen, one of the firm's principals, had photographed the station's original cast-iron station entrance kiosks as an architecture student at the neighboring Cooper Union, and he advocated for a replica kiosk to be installed over the northbound entrance.

The station's renovation started in June 1984 and was completed by May 1986. The scope of the project included the restoration of the platform's glazed ceramic beaver plaques; refurbishing the 1950s platform extensions with a design similar to the original station; cleaning the ceiling; and adding new lighting, noise-abatement material, and brown floor tiles. A new piece of porcelain steel artwork by Cooper Union alumnus Milton Glaser was installed and a cast-iron copy of one of the station's original kiosks was built. The MTA rejected Glaser's original proposal to include beaver representations in the artwork because the beavers too closely resembled rats. Glaser's artwork was installed as a gift, and the kiosk was installed using leftover funding. An underpass between the northbound and southbound platforms was closed and covered up in the 1980s renovation. Sound-deadening panels were also installed in the station. Following the completion of the project, architectural writer Paul Goldberger wrote that the Astor Place station's "value as architecture lies not in any generous space it offers, but in a series of pleasing details".

== Station layout ==
Like other local stations, Astor Place has four tracks and two side platforms. The 6 stops here at all times, rush-hour and midday <6> trains stop here in the peak direction; and the 4 stops here during late nights. The two express tracks are used by the 4 and 5 trains during daytime hours. The station is between 14th Street–Union Square to the north and Bleecker Street to the south. The platforms were originally 200 feet (61 m) long, like at other local stations on the original IRT, but as a result of the 1959 platform extensions, became 525 feet (160 m) long. The platform extensions are at the front ends of the original platforms: the southbound platform was extended southward and the northbound platform was extended northward, resulting in the two platforms being offset from each other. Both platforms are slightly curved, since the station itself is placed on an S-curve between Lafayette Street and Fourth Avenue. Fixed platform barriers, which are intended to prevent commuters falling to the tracks, are positioned near the platform edges.

=== Design ===
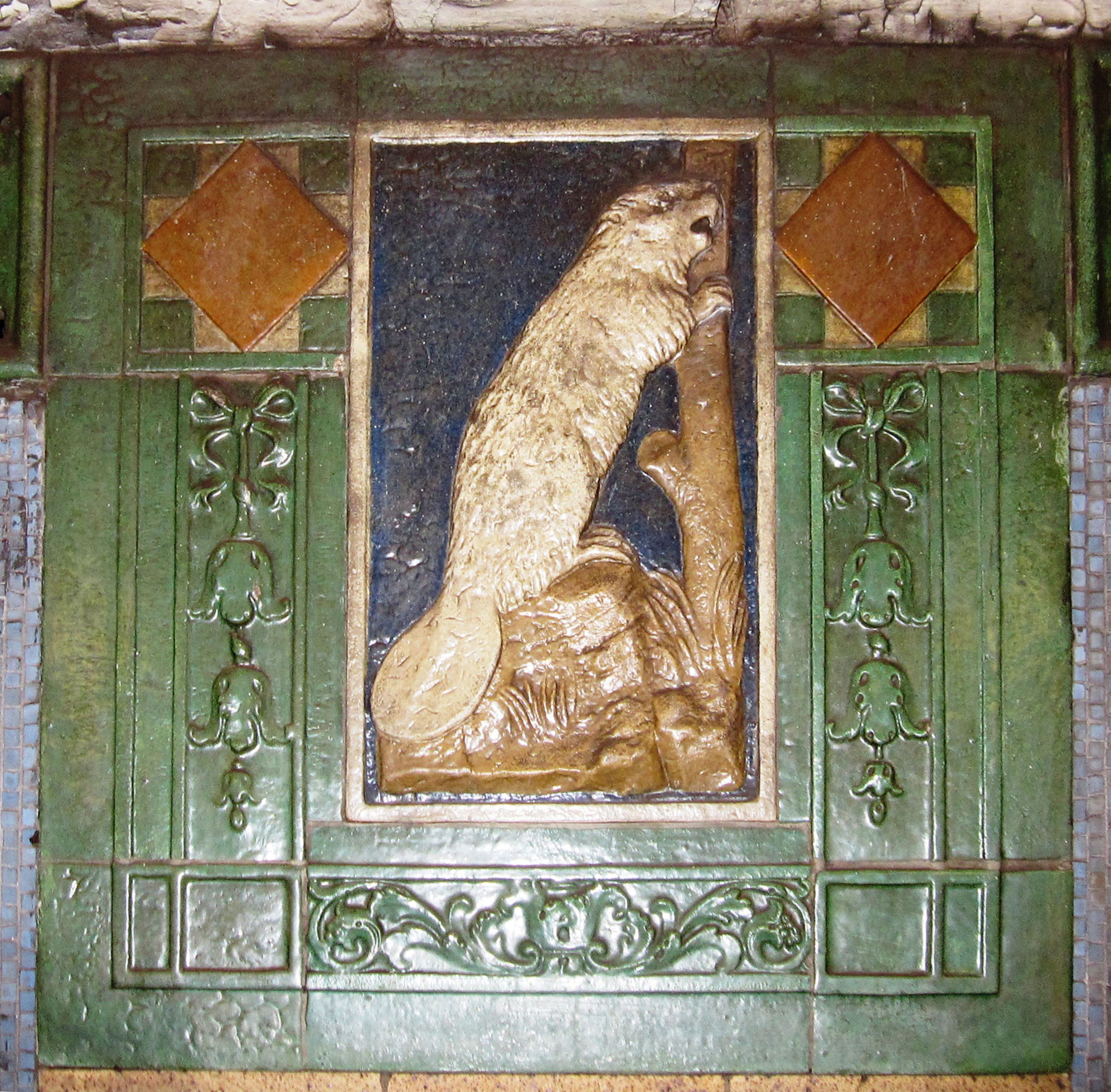
Faience plaque with beaver

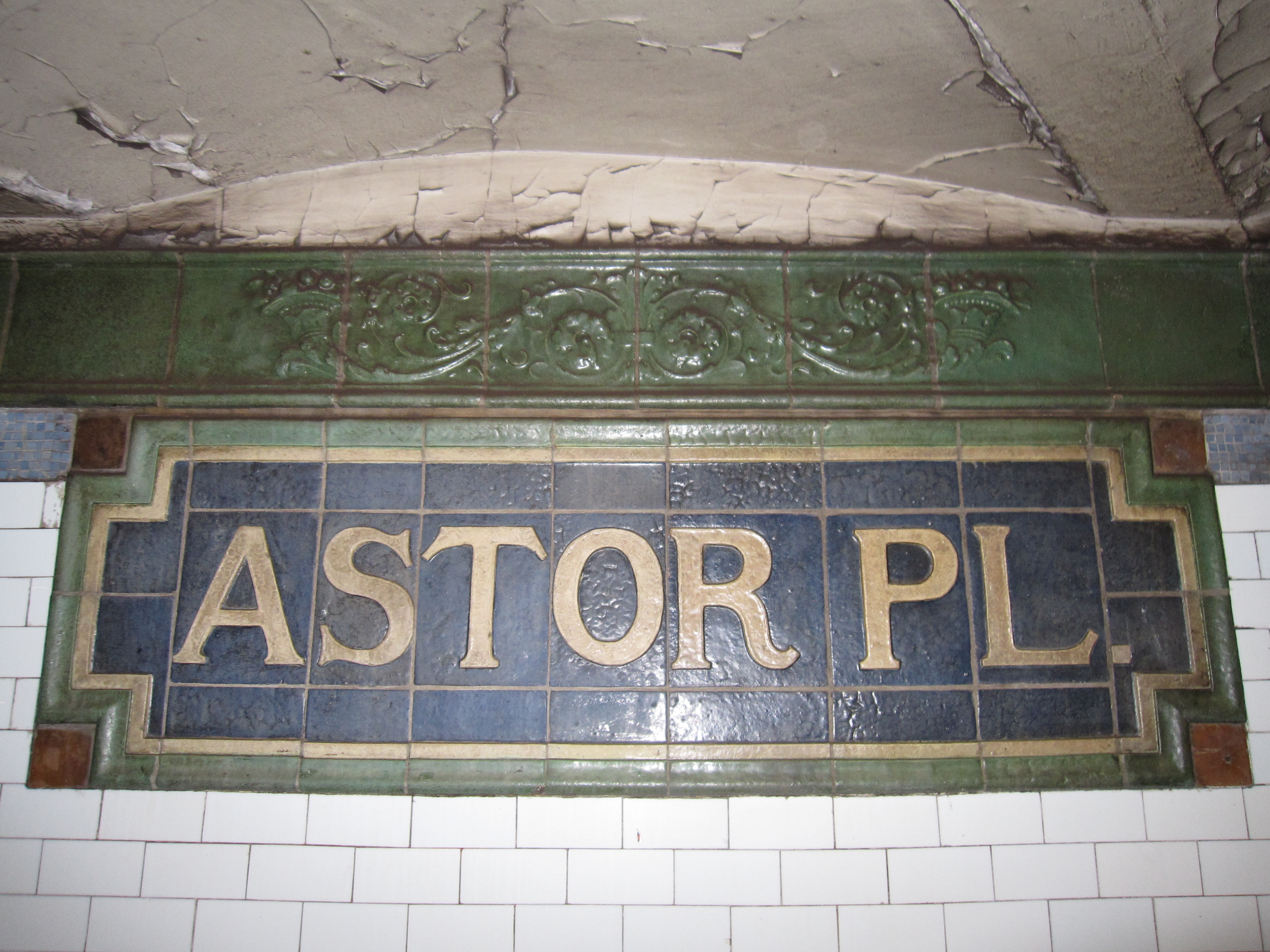
Faience name tablet

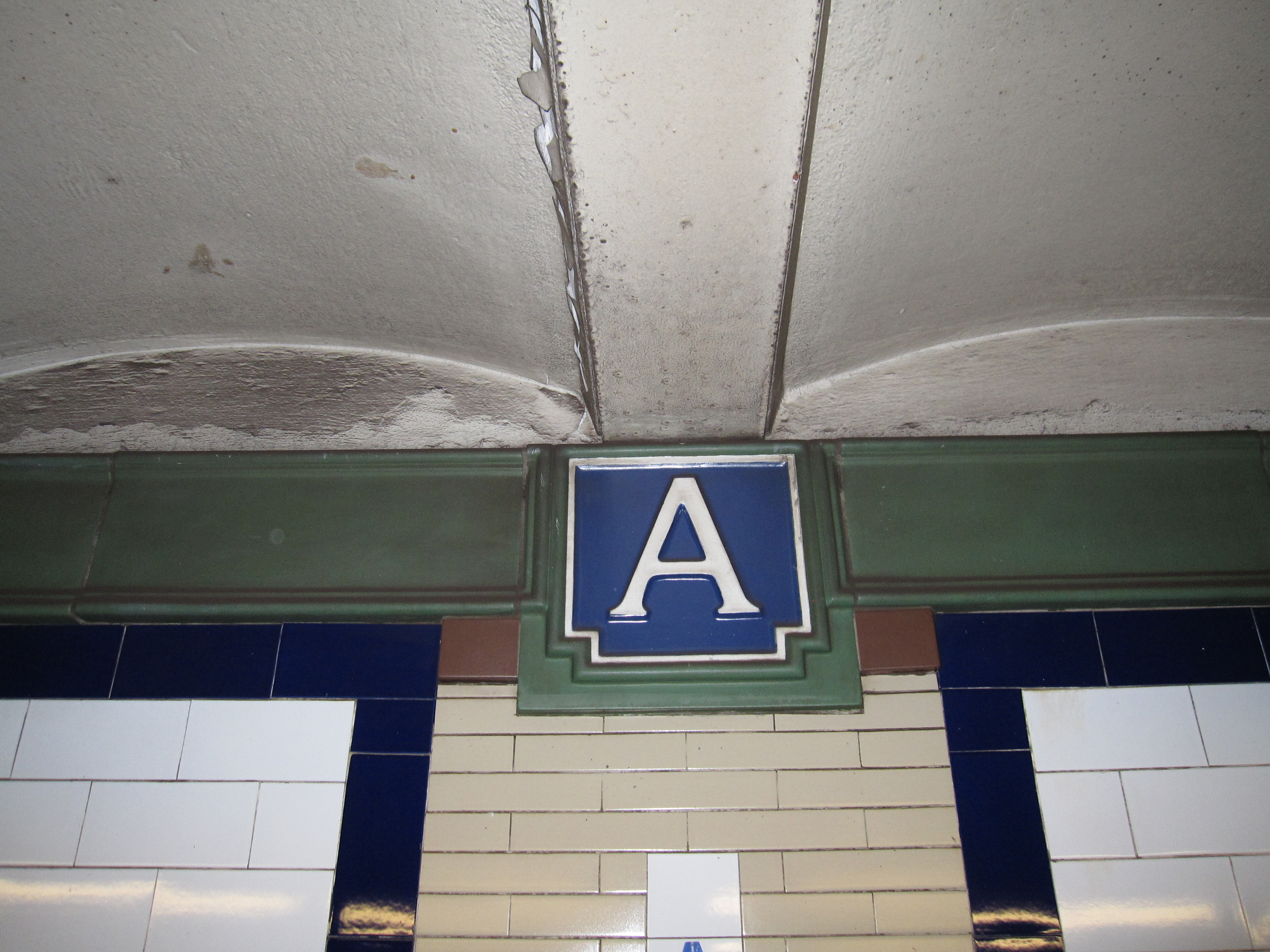
Tile with initial "A"

As with other stations built as part of the original IRT, the station was constructed using a cut-and-cover method. The tunnel is covered by a U-shaped trough that contains utility pipes and wires. This trough contains a foundation of concrete no less than 4 inches (100 mm) thick. Each platform consists of 3-inch-thick (7.6 cm) concrete slabs, beneath which are drainage basins. The original platforms contain circular, cast-iron Doric-style columns spaced every 15 feet (4.6 m), while the platform extensions contain I-beam columns, some clad with white glazed tiles. The columns contain black-and-white signs alternating between "Astor Place" and "Cooper Union". Additional columns between the tracks, spaced every 5 feet (1.5 m), support the jack-arched concrete station roofs. The ceiling height varies based on whether there are utilities in the ceiling; the areas without utilities is about 15 feet (4.6 m) above platform level, while the area with utilities has a ceiling height of 8 feet (2.4 m). There is a 1-inch (25 mm) gap between the trough wall and the platform walls, which are made of 4-inch (100 mm)-thick brick covered over by a tiled finish.

The fare control areas are at platform level and there is no free transfer between directions. The underpass that formerly connected the platforms opened along with the rest of the station in 1904, making Astor Place one of the few locations in the original IRT where passengers could transfer between directions for free.

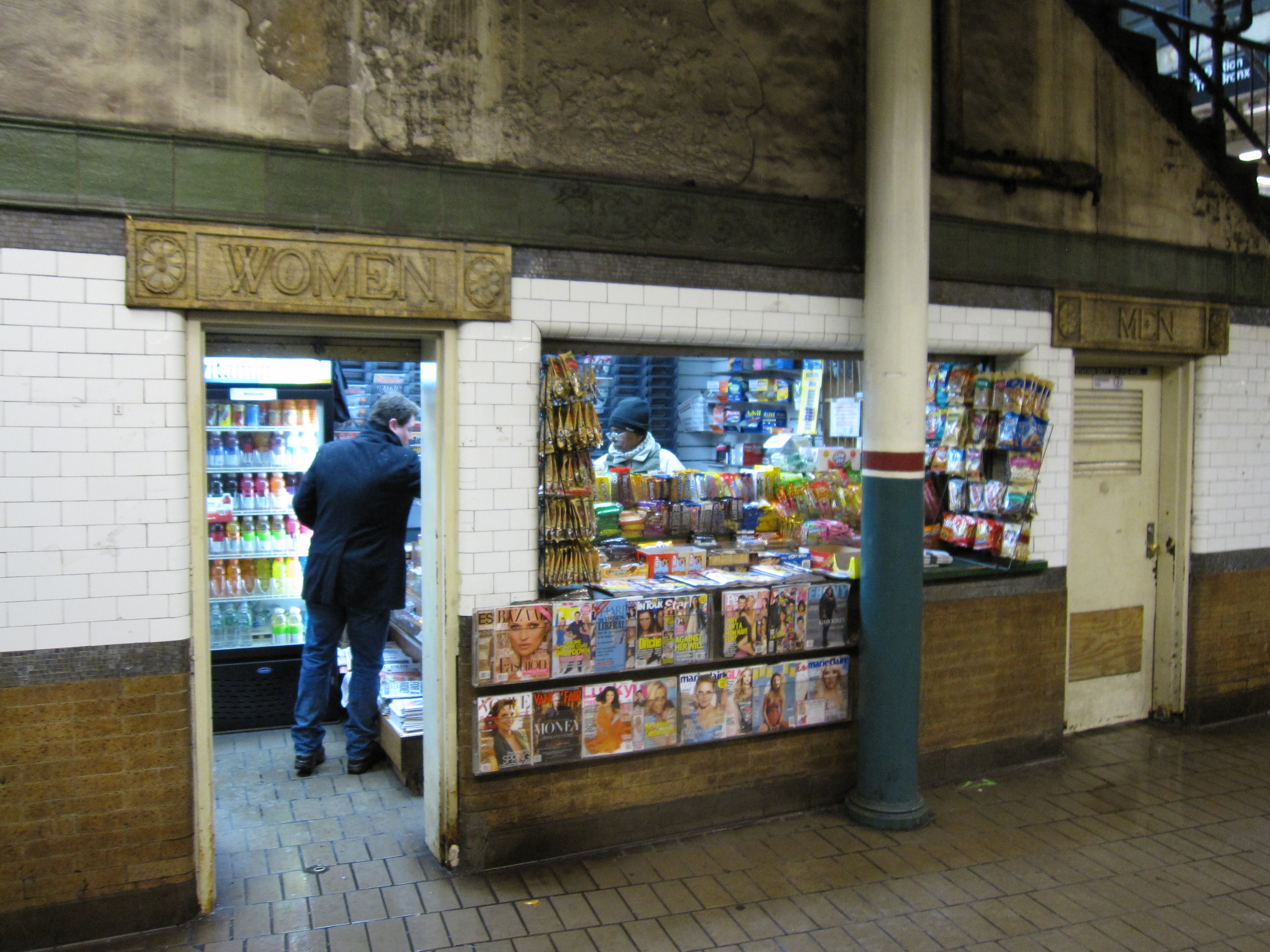
Former women's restroom converted into newsstand (now closed and walled off)

The walls in this station contain modern enamel artwork. The walls along the platforms near the fare control areas consist of a brick wainscoting on the lowest part of the wall, with bronze air vents along the wainscoting, and white glass tiles above. The platform walls are divided at 15-foot (4.6 m) intervals by buff brick tile pilasters, or vertical bands; the wall sections between each pilaster contain a border of blue mosaic tiles. In the original portion of the station, each pilaster is topped by yellow faience plaques depicting beavers, surrounded by green scrolled and foliate motifs. The beaver plaques are a reference to John Jacob Astor, whose fortune had been derived from the beaver-pelt trade. A faience cornice with green urn and vine motifs runs atop these walls. Cream-on-blue faience plaques with the words "Astor Place" are also spaced at various intervals on the walls, a deviation from the tile plaques seen at other original IRT stations. The platform extensions contain similar decorative elements, but the pilasters are made of tan ceramic tiles, and the wall sections between each pilaster contain a border of blue ceramic tiles. Within the platform extensions' pilasters are tiled plaques with the vertical text "Astor". There were maroon and gold tile Cooper Union signs underneath the tile Astor Place signs, which were destroyed during the renovation. The mosaic tiles at all original IRT stations were manufactured by the American Encaustic Tile Company, which subcontracted the installations at each station. The decorative work was performed by tile contractor Manhattan Glass Tile Company and faience contractor Grueby Faience Company.

The northbound platform contains doorways that formerly led to men's and women's restrooms, with corresponding marble lintels. A news and candy stand was in the former women's restroom, but it has been closed and walled off as of 2021. North of fare control is a rounded seating area. The northbound platform was used as a cover image of Billy Joel's 1976 album Turnstiles.

On the southbound side, the station originally had an entrance and windows into a store. The heavy brick-faced square columns on the southbound platform support the store above. The store was originally constructed in 1868 as an A. T. Stewart, but it had become a Wanamaker's by the time the station was constructed and opened. The Wanamaker's store was closed by 1954. It served as a Kmart location from November 1996 to July 2021; there was once an entrance from the subway station into the Kmart store. A Wegmans location opened within the Kmart space in late 2023, with the old Kmart store entrance permanently removed and sealed away.

Also present on the southbound side is a sealed doorway with a marble lintel reading "Clinton Hall". This doorway once led to the New York Mercantile Library in the former Astor Opera House.

=== Exits ===
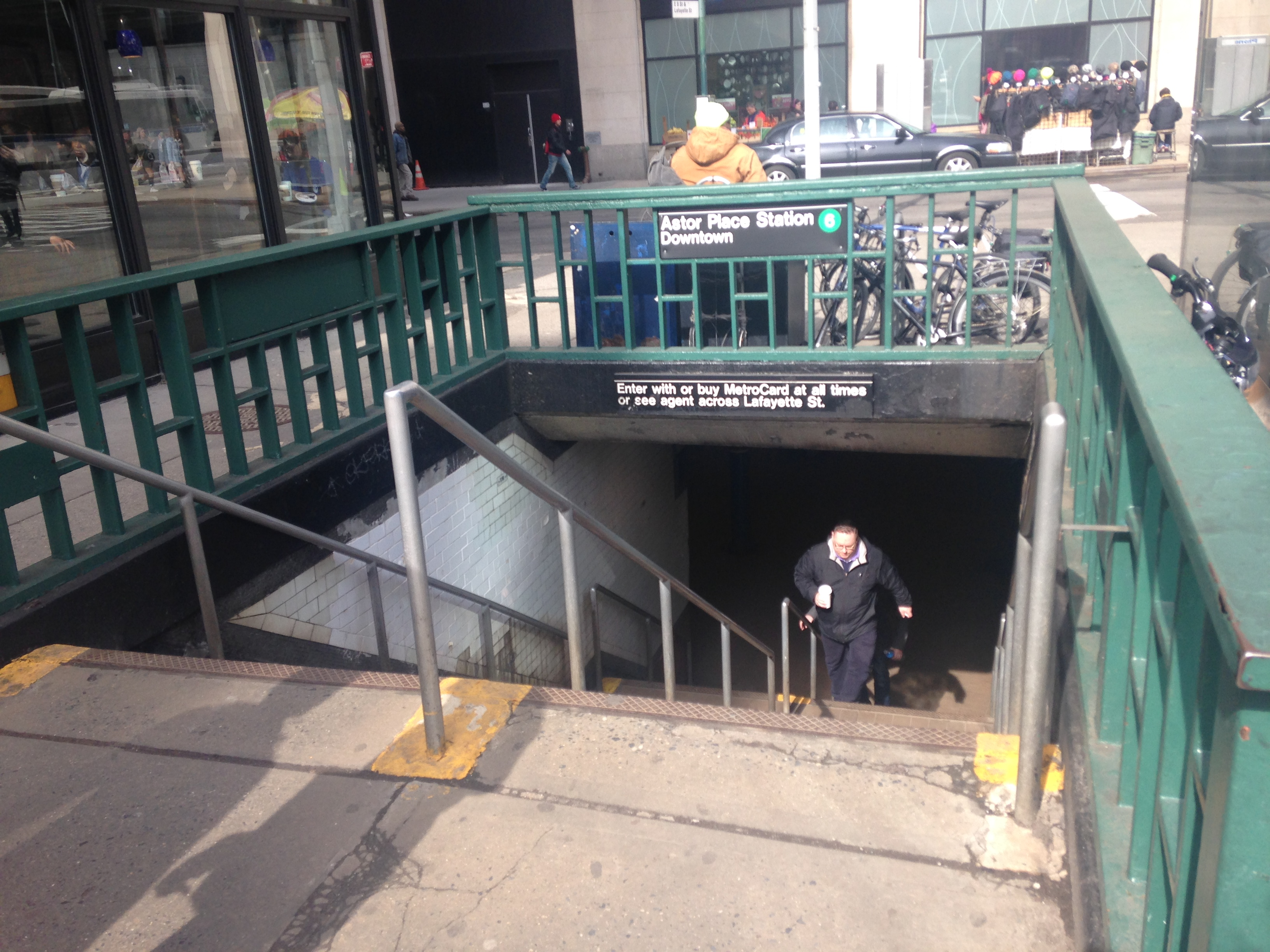
Southbound entrance

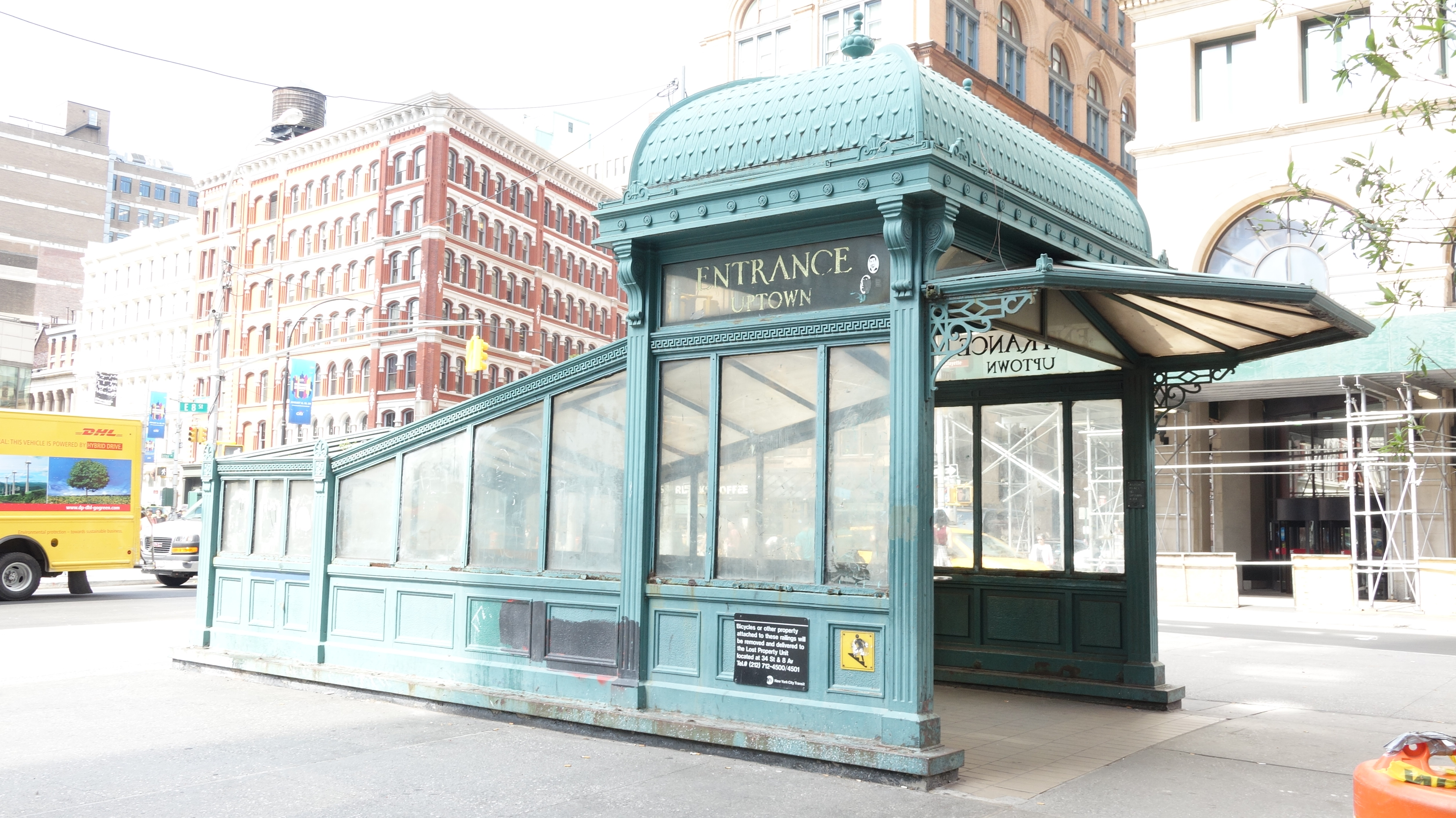
Northbound entrance, a reproduction of an old IRT kiosk.

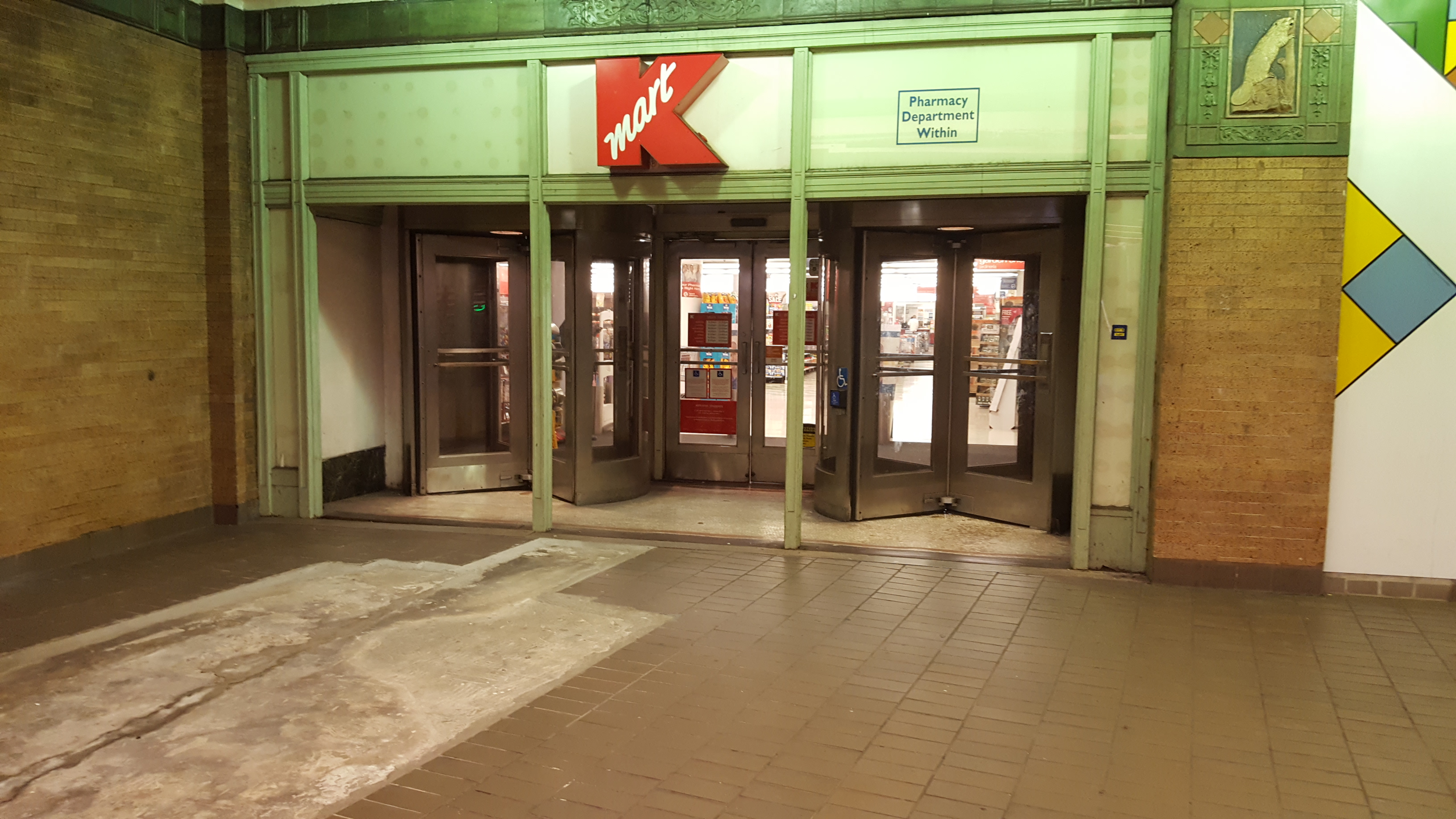
Easement exit to 770 Broadway from the southbound platform in 2016; this exit has since been closed

The station has one street entrance in each direction. The southbound platform's entrance is at the southwest corner of Astor Place and Lafayette Street. The street staircase on the southbound side contains modern steel railings like those seen at most New York City Subway stations.

The northbound platform's entrance is in the traffic island bounded by Fourth Avenue, Lafayette Street, and Eighth Street. Unlike the southbound entrance, the northbound entrance contains a highly decorative entrance, reminiscent of an entry kiosk seen on the original IRT. The structure is an imitation of the IRT's original entrance and exit kiosks, extremely ornate structures made of cast iron and glass. The IRT kiosks were inspired by those on the Budapest Metro, which themselves were inspired by ornate summer houses called "kushks". The Astor Place entrance is a reproduction installed in the 1980s and was made at the same factory as the originals. The kiosk is 13 feet (4.0 m) wide, 22 feet (6.7 m) long, and 16 feet (4.9 m) tall. The replica was largely based from photographs by renovating architect Rolf Ohlhausen. Like the original entrance kiosks, it has a domed roof with cast-iron shingles. Unlike the originals, the roof of the kiosk have clear tempered glass to allow natural light, while the original kiosks had translucent glass with chicken wire, which tended to become dirty over time. Additionally, the decorative pieces of the new kiosk were molded from fragments of the originals, but the new kiosk was made of lighter-weight material.

== Points of interest ==
Several sites of historical and cultural importance are near the station, such as New York University and Cooper Union. The Alamo, a cube sculpture in the traffic island above the northbound platform, is a popular visitor attraction in the area. Other points of interest include:

- McSorley's Old Ale House
- Cooper Union New Academic Building
- Cooper Square Hotel
- Astor Library Building (housing The Public Theater; formerly the Astor Library)
- Astor Place Theatre (part of Colonnade Row; formerly occupied by Blue Man Group; occupied by No Guarantees Productions since 2025)
- Hamilton Fish House

The Eighth Street–New York University station on the BMT Broadway Line is one block west of the station.

== See also ==
- List of New York City Designated Landmarks in Manhattan below 14th Street
- National Register of Historic Places listings in Manhattan below 14th Street
