= Viviana Durante =

Italian ballet dancer

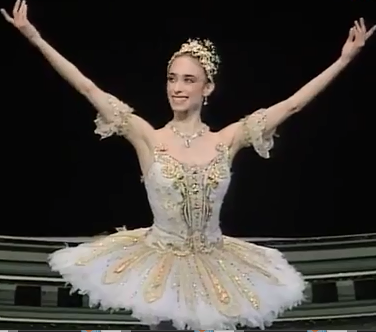
- Viviana Durante as Aurora in Sleeping Beauty (1994)
- Born: 8 May 1967 (age 59); Rome, Italy
- Occupation: Ballet dancer
- Years active: 1984–2020
- Height: 1.57 m (5 ft 2 in)
- Spouse: Nigel Cliff (m. 2009)
- Children: 1
- Awards: Prix de Lausanne; Evening Standard Ballet Award; Laurence Olivier Award
- Website: Official website

Viviana Durante (born 8 May 1967) is an Italian ballet dancer, considered one of the great dramatic ballerinas of recent times. She was a principal dancer of The Royal Ballet, American Ballet Theatre, Teatro alla Scala and K-Ballet. She is the artistic director of English National Ballet School and of the Viviana Durante Company.

== Early career ==
Durante was born in Rome and started ballet there at the Teatro dell'Opera di Roma aged six. Spotted by ballerina Galina Samsova, she joined the lower school of the Royal Ballet School at White Lodge in Richmond Park, London. A year later, she featured in a Thames Television documentary entitled I really want to dance. Shortly after graduating to the upper school, aged 17, she joined the Royal Ballet Company. Two years later, she attracted national attention when she took over as Odette/Odile in mid-performance, never having been taught the role. At 21, she became the company's youngest principal dancer, and a year later, in 1990, she became the youngest artist to receive the Evening Standard Ballet Award.

== Royal Ballet ==
At the Royal Ballet, Durante danced all the main roles in ballets by Sir Kenneth MacMillan (Manon, Romeo and Juliet, Mayerling, Different Drummer, My Brother, My Sisters, Requiem, Elite Syncopations, Gloria, The Prince of the Pagodas and Anastasia, for which she was nominated for a Laurence Olivier Award), Sir Frederick Ashton (Cinderella, La fille mal gardée, Rhapsody, Ondine, A Month in the Country, A Midsummer Night's Dream, Symphonic Variations, Les Patineurs, Birthday Offering, Scènes de ballet, Thaïs pas de deux) and from the classical repertory (Swan Lake, The Nutcracker, Giselle, The Sleeping Beauty, La Bayadere, Don Quixote, Les Biches, Raymonda, Diana and Actaeon, Sylvia pas de deux).

She created roles in many new works including MacMillan's The Judas Tree and Winter Dreams (based on Anton Chekhov's Three Sisters); Wayne McGregor's Fleur de Peux; Ashley Page's Pursuit, Piano, Bloodlines, ...now languorous, now wild... and Cheating, Lying, Stealing; Will Tuckett's Present Histories; David Bintley's Tombeaux; and Amedeo Amodio's Cabiria.

In 1992, Durante and her fellow principal Darcey Bussell were the joint subjects of a South Bank Show documentary Two Ballerinas at the Royal Ballet (UK: Two Royal Ballet Dancers), and the following year both were invited by the New York City Ballet for the Balanchine Celebration at the New York State Theater.

In 1995, she appeared in the title role of a ninety-minute version of Tchaikovsky's The Sleeping Beauty, which was telecast on Great Performances by PBS during the Christmas season. In 1998, Durante made a return to the Rome stage as a guest artist in Prokovsky's production of the Tchaikovsky ballet, one of many international guest appearances.

Durante appeared on the cover of Cosmopolitan and Harpers and Queen magazines and was profiled in many publications including Vogue, Elle, and Hello. She modelled for photographic shoots for Karl Lagerfeld and Valentino and for catwalk shows by Maison Gattinoni, and featured in commercials for Toyota.

In 1999, a disagreement between Durante and The Royal Ballet, reportedly following her request for a cast change after she was dropped by a partner, blew up into a national media storm. After what the media called a 'dazzling 12-year career' as one of British ballet's major stars, Durante left the company in 2001 to pursue a freelance career.

== Subsequent career ==
Durante joined American Ballet Theatre as a principal dancer for the 1999 spring season at the Metropolitan Opera House, New York City. She subsequently appeared as a guest artist with major international ballet companies including La Scala Milan, Tokyo Ballet and Dresden Semperoper Ballett. From 2003 to 2012, she was the leading ballerina of Japan's K-Ballet, founded by fellow Royal Ballet alumnus Tetsuya Kumakawa. Continuing to perform the classics, she also took roles in ballets including Bintley's Cyrano de Bergerac; George Balanchine's Apollo, Ballet Imperial, Stravinsky Violin Concerto, Who Cares? and Symphony in C; Rudolf Nureyev's Laurentia; Tetley's La Ronde; Uwe Scholz's The Red and the Black; Roland Petit's Coppelia, Carmen and Duke Ellington Ballet; and André Prokovsky's Anna Karenina.

Durante is a patron of The Hammond School and New English Ballet Theatre. She is a regular juror at competitions including the Prix de Lausanne and the Beijing International Ballet Competition. In 2010, a work choreographed by Durante premiered at Dance Base, Edinburgh, and the same year she collaborated with Richard Eyre on a dance adaptation of the film Truly, Madly, Deeply.

Durante holds diplomas in dance education from the Royal Ballet School and Trinity College, London. In 2016, she returned to The Royal Ballet as a regular guest coach. In 2017, she founded Viviana Durante Company which debuted with Kenneth MacMillan: Steps Back in Time at the Barbican Centre. In 2020 the company premiered Isadora Now at the same venue. Durante was the consultant and wrote the foreword for the 2018 DK book Ballet: The Definitive Illustrated History. In 2019 she was appointed Director of Dance and in 2020 Artistic Director at English National Ballet School.

== Critical reviews ==
Critics noted Durante's combination of immaculate technique and acting ability, often describing her as a blend of Latin passion and British coolness. Her Anastasia was widely appreciated, her Manon (with Russian dancer Irek Mukhamedov as Des Grieux, in particular) has been called the definitive interpretation, and the recording of her performance in The Sleeping Beauty has been perhaps most influential. Critics called her 'the most dramatic of dancers', and an 'unsurpassable actress' (The Independent).

== Personal life ==
Durante married the British author and journalist Nigel Cliff in June 2009. They have a son, and live in London.

== Awards and honours (selected) ==
- Awarded Dancer of the Year in the UK, Japan, Italy, Chile
- 1984 Prix de Lausanne
- 1989 Time Out Award
- 1989 Evening Standard Award
- 1991 Premio Positano
- 1997 Premio Internazionale "Gino Tani" per le Arti dello Spettacolo, Rome
- 1997 Laurence Olivier Award – nominated for Anastasia
- 2002 Premio Positano
- 2003 Premio Vignale danza
- 2006 Premio Bucchi
- 2007 Premio Apulia
- 2018 Premio Eccellenze della Danza
- 2019 Premio Fabbrini, Florence
- 2023 Premio Nazionale Sfera D’Oro, Premio alla Carriera

== Theatre ==
- 2008 Fram – new play by Tony Harrison, Royal National Theatre, London
- 2007 Escaping Hamlet – play at Edinburgh Festival directed by Gianpiero Borgia

== Films ==
- 1990 Die Fledermaus (Royal Opera House)
- 1991 Winter Dreams (Royal Ballet)
- 1993 George Balanchine Celebration (New York City Ballet)
- 1993 Gala Tribute To Tchaikovsky (Royal Opera House)
- 1994 The Sleeping Beauty (Royal Ballet)
- 1994 Mayerling (Royal Ballet)
- 2000 Carmen (K-Ballet)
- 2000 Royal Opera House Opening Celebration
- 2002 Giselle (K-Ballet)
- 2002 Ogni 27 Agosto (film directed by Antonio Serrano)
- 2003 Swan Lake (K-Ballet)
- 2003 The Sleeping Beauty (K-Ballet)
