= Nigel Cliff =

British biographer, historian, translator and critic

- Born: 26 December 1969 (age 56); Manchester, England
- Education: Winchester College; Harris Manchester College, Oxford
- Occupations: Historian; biographer; translator; columnist
- Spouse: Viviana Durante (m. 2009)
- Children: 1 son

Nigel Cliff (born 26 December 1969) is a British biographer, historian, translator and critic. In 2022 Oxford University awarded Cliff the degree of Doctor of Letters in recognition of a body of work of international importance.

== Biography ==
Born in Manchester, Cliff was educated on scholarships at Winchester College and Harris Manchester College, Oxford University, where he gained a first-class degree and was awarded the Beddington Prize for English Literature. He has been a film and theatre critic for The Times, a contributor to The Economist, a columnist for Dajia, the online magazine of Tencent, and a reviewer for The New York Times Book Review. Cliff has lectured at Oxford University, the Harry Ransom Center and the British Library and is a regular guest on television and radio programmes including Start the Week and MSNBC's Morning Joe. He was a fellow of Harris Manchester College, Oxford, from 2016 to 2021 and a Fellow of the Royal Literary Fund from 2017 to 2019. He also runs a ballet company and has produced shows for the Barbican Centre and the Bolshoi Theatre.

== Career ==
Cliff's first book, The Shakespeare Riots: Revenge, Drama, and Death in Nineteenth-century America, was published in the United States by Random House in 2007. Centring on a feud between leading Shakespearean actors William Charles Macready and Edwin Forrest that led to the deadly Astor Place Riot of 1849, it dramatises the birth of a distinctly American entertainment industry and demonstrates the centrality of Shakespeare to nineteenth-century American identity.

Writing in the London Review of Books, Michael Dobson called the book 'wonderful... a brilliant debut... both enthralling and scholarly." In the Los Angeles Times, Phillip Lopate called it 'Brilliantly engrossing... exemplary... engaging, worldly, fluent... crammed with entertaining nuggets.'. The book was a Washington Post Book of the Year and was a finalist for the National Award for Arts Writing. Cliff wrote the adapted screenplay for Muse Productions.

Cliff's second book was Holy War: How Vasco da Gama's Epic Voyages Turned the Tide in a Centuries-old Clash of Civilisations (Harper, 2011). It was subsequently issued as The Last Crusade: The Epic Voyages of Vasco da Gama by Harper Perennial in 2012. The book was published under the latter name by Atlantic in the UK and under the former name in Portugal, Brazil, Japan, Russia, Turkey, Poland, China and Taiwan. The book was a New York Times Notable Book and was shortlisted for the PEN Hessell-Tiltman Prize and the Mountbatten Award. In the New York Times Eric Ormsby wrote: "Cliff has a novelist's gift for depicting character." In The Sunday Times James McConnachie called the book 'stirringly epic...[a] thrilling narrative."

Cliff's third book was a new translation and critical edition of Marco Polo's Travels for Penguin Classics, which was released in the UK and U.S. in 2015. For this first all-new translation in a half-century, he went back to the original texts in French, Latin and Italian.

Cliff's fourth book, Moscow Nights: The Van Cliburn Story - How One Man and His Piano Transformed the Cold War, was published by Harper in September 2016 and subsequently in multiple translations. The Boston Globe named it a Book of the Year. In January 2017 it was named a finalist for the National Book Critics Circle Award. The book won Nautilus Gold And Silver Awards.

== Personal life ==
Cliff married the ballerina Viviana Durante in June 2009. They have a son, and live in London.

== Books ==
- Cliff, Nigel (2007). The Shakespeare Riots: Revenge, Drama, and Death in Nineteenth-Century America. New York: Random House. ISBN 9780345486943.
- Cliff, Nigel (2011). Holy War: How Vasco da Gama's Epic Voyages Turned the Tide in a Centuries-Old Clash of Civilizations. New York: Harper. ISBN 9780061735127.
- Cliff, Nigel (2012). The Last Crusade: The Epic Voyages of Vasco da Gama. New York: Harper Perennial. ISBN 9780061735134.
- Cliff, Nigel (2015). Marco Polo, The Travels. London: Penguin Classics. ISBN 978-0141198774.
- Cliff, Nigel (2016). Moscow Nights: The Van Cliburn Story - How One Man and His Piano Transformed the Cold War.
