= Astor Opera House =

Theater in Manhattan, New York (1847–1890)

Coordinates: 40°43′48.5″N 73°59′30.5″W

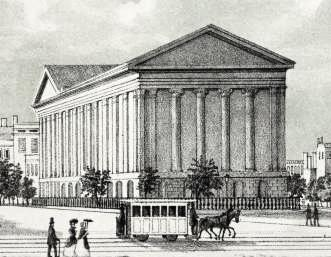
Astor Opera House (1847–1890), on Lexington Street, between Astor Place and East 8th Street, in Lower Manhattan in 1850

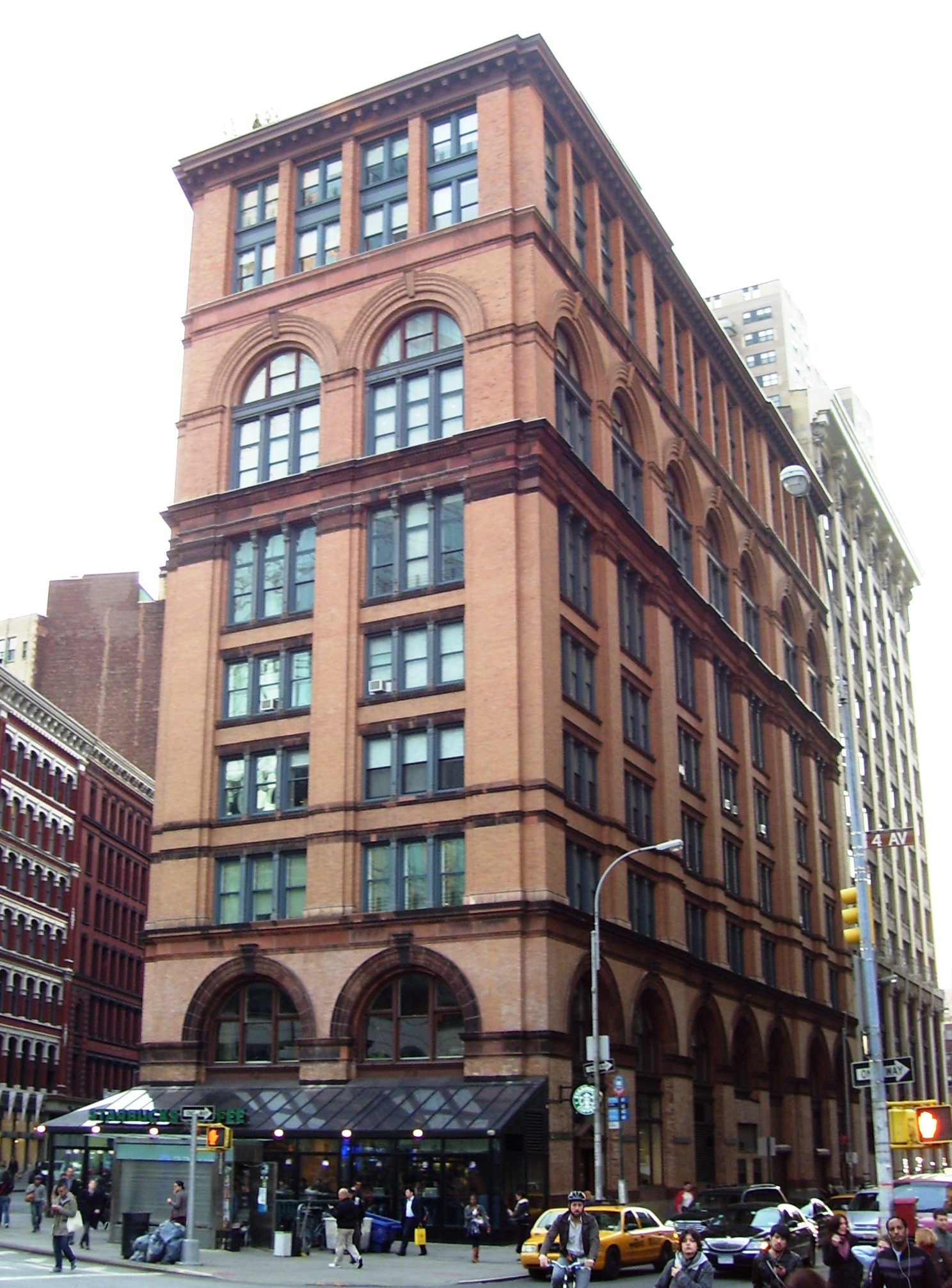
This 11-story building, now condominiums, replaced the old 1847 Astor Opera House building in 1890.

The Astor Opera House, also known as the Astor Place Opera House and later the Astor Place Theatre, was an opera house in Lower Manhattan, New York City, on Lafayette Street between Astor Place and East 8th Street. Designed by Isaiah Rogers (1800–1869), in the Classical Revival style of architecture, inspired by the temples of Ancient Greece and Rome of two thousand years earlier. The theater was conceived by impresario Edward Fry, the brother of composer William Henry Fry (1813–1864), who managed the famed opera house during its entire history.

== Opera House ==
Fry engaged the Sanquerico and Patti Opera Company under the management of John Sefton to perform the first season of opera at the house. The opera house opened on November 22, 1847 with a performance of Giuseppe Verdi's Ernani with Adelino Vietti in the title role. Sefton and his company were not re-engaged by Fry, and the opera management of the house went to Cesare Lietti for the second season. During his tenure the opera house presented the United States premiere of Verdi's Nabucco on April 4, 1848.

Lietti was also replaced after one season, and the Astor's third and longest lasting opera manager, Max Maretzek (1821-1897), was hired for the third season, which commenced in November 1848. The following year Maretzek founded his own opera company, the Max Maretzek Italian Opera Company, with whom he continued to stage operas at the Astor Opera House through to 1852. Under Maretzek, the opera house saw the New York premiere of Donizetti's Anna Bolena on January 7, 1850 with soprano Apollonia Bertucca (later Maretzek's wife) as the title heroine.

The theatre was built with the intention of attracting only the "best" patrons, the "uppertens" of New York high society, who were increasingly turning out to see European singers and productions who appeared at local venues such as Niblo's Garden. It was expected that an opera house would be:

a substitute for a general drawing room – a refined attraction which the ill-mannered would not be likely to frequent, and around which the higher classes might gather, for the easier interchange of courtesies, and for that closer view which aides the candidacy of acquaintance.

In pursuit of this agenda, the theatre was created with the comfort of the upper classes in mind: benches, the normal seating in theatres at the time, were replaced by upholstered seats, available only by subscription, as were the two tiers of boxes. On the other hand, 500 general admission patrons were relegated to the benches of a "cockloft" reachable only by a narrow stairway, and otherwise isolated from the gentry below, and the theatre enforced a dress code which required "freshly shaven faces, evening dress, and kid gloves".

Limiting the attendance of the lower classes was partly intended to avoid the problems of rowdyism and hooliganism and common street crime which plagued other theaters in the entertainment district at the time, especially in the theatres further south on the Bowery. Nevertheless, it was the deadly infamous Astor Place Riot, only a year and a half after opening on May 10, 1849, which caused the theatre to close permanently – provoked by competing performances of Macbeth by English actor William Charles Macready (1793–1873), at the Opera House (which was then operating under the name "Astor Place Theatre", not being able to sustain itself on a full season of opera) and American Shakespearean actor Edwin Forrest (1806–1872), at the nearby Broadway Theatre, an earlier location of the venue on 41st Street that operated from 1888 to 1929.

== Clinton Hall ==
After the riot, the theater was unable to overcome the reputation of being the "Massacre Opera House" at "DisAster Place". By May 1853, the interior had been dismantled and the furnishings sold off, with the shell of the building sold for $140,000 to the New York Mercantile Library, which renamed the building "Clinton Hall".

In 1890, in need of additional space, the library tore down the opera house building and replaced it with an 11-story building, also called Clinton Hall, which still stands on the site.
