= Felicita Vestvali =

German opera singer (1831–1880)

- Felicita Vestvali, the 'Queen of the lyric stage' ca. 1855
- Born: Anna Marie Stegemann; 23 February 1831; Stettin, Kingdom of Prussia
- Died: 3 April 1880 (aged 49); Warsaw, Congress Poland
- Other names: Felicita von Vestvali, Felicita de Vestvali, Felicitas Vestvali
- Occupations: Opera singer, actress, opera impresaria
- Years active: 1847–1877
- Known for: playing Hamlet and other roles in travesti

Felicita Vestvali (born Anna Marie Stegemann, also known as Felicità von Vestvali or variations thereof; 23 February 1831 – 3 April 1880) was a German operatic contralto, actress, and impresaria. She became famous both in Europe and the United States.

Vestvali was admired for her physical beauty, stage presence, and vocal capabilities. Her specialism in trouser roles, however, sparked mixed reviews. Some of her most famous operatic roles included Azucena in Verdi's Il Trovatore, Orsini in Donizetti's Lucrezia Borgia, Romeo in Bellini's I Capuleti e i Montecchi, and Arsace in Rossini's Semiramide. In May 1855, Vestvali was part of the opera troupe that gave the American premiere of Il Trovatore, performing as Azucena. She then began starring in melodramatic productions from 1863. Some of the characters she portrayed were Angelo Bracchioforte in John Brougham's Bel Demonio, Gamea in Gamea; or the Jewish Mother, Henri de Largadère in The Duke's Motto, and Alessandro Massaroni in The Brigand. From the late 1860s, Vestvali expanded her repertoire to include the plays of Shakespeare. She was best known for her appearances as Romeo, Hamlet, and Petruchio, particularly in Germany and England.

Although a neglected figure in opera and theatre history, Vestvali regularly performed and worked with more well-known figures such as Giulia Grisi, Marietta Almonti, Pasquale Brignoli, Millicent Bandmann-Palmer, and Max Maretzek, among others.

== Life ==
=== Early life ===
Despite her Italian stage name, Vestvali was born in Stettin, Kingdom of Prussia (now Szczecin, Poland), as Anna Marie Stegemann. Her father, Georg Leberecht Stegemann (1789–1842) was a widowed lieutenant, and her mother was Baroness Charlotte Stegemann, nee von Hünefeld (1794–1860). The Stegemanns were a Lutheran and German-speaking family, however Charlotte had Polish ancestors, and Georg's son from the previous marriage (Henryk Westwalewicz) was Polish, and so it is likely that young Anna Marie's household also used Polish.

=== Theatrical training and early roles ===
Very little is known about Vestvali's early life and musical training. It was rumoured that Vestvali's family refused her theater training and, because of this, ran away from home in boy's clothes when she was 15. She joined the impresario Wilhelm Bröckelmann and his theater company. She debuted in Leipzig in 1847 as Romeo in Bellini's I Capuleti e i Montecchi.

In 1848 Felicita became pregnant, giving birth to a daughter named Marie Jenny Emma in 1849. The father's name was not registered, but the most likely candidate was the Italian music writer and critic Joseph de Filippi.

In 1850, under name Felicita de Westwalewicz, she traveled to England, giving solo concerts in London and Guernsey, where she also was a home teacher. In 1851 she moved to Naples, studying under Saverio Mercadante and befriending the writer Francesco Mastriani (who dedicated his novel Il mio Cadavere to her). She continued musical education in Florence under Pietro Romani. During this time, she took the stage name Felicita Vestvali and sang as a supposedly Italian singer in La Scala, as Azucena in Il trovatore in 1853.

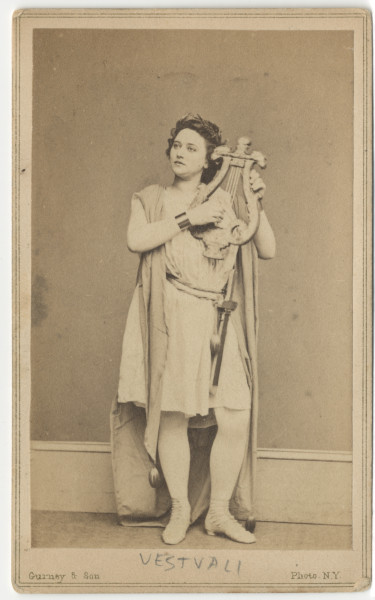
Vestvali as Orpheus in Gluck's opera Orfeo ed Euridice, New York, 1863.

=== Opera successes ===
Due to the La Scala performance, Vestvali performed for Royal Opera in 1854, in her first 'mature' travesti role of Orsini in Donizetti's Lucrezia Borgia. This didn't lead to a new contract, so in January 1855 Felicita and Henryk traveled to the USA, leaving Marie with de Filippi. In New York, she was hired to play Arsace in Semiramide, earning the admiration of figures such as John Bigelow and Walt Whitman. Her other roles in America included Leonora in La favorite, Alisa in Lucia di Lammermoor, and Armando di Gondì in Maria di Rohan. In May 1855, Vestvali was part of the opera troupe that gave the American premiere of Il Trovatore, performing as Azucena.

In October 1855 Felicita and Henryk moved to Mexico City, where Felicita worked at the Teatro Nacional as the impresaria of an Italian opera troupe. Her most praised role there was Romeo. In March 1857 she traveled to Cuba to perform in Havana's Tacón Theatre, then returned to the USA, where she became "Vestvali the Magnificent".

In 1859, likely thanks to Jean-François Mocquard or Józef Michał Poniatowski she was brought back to the Paris Opera. According to a popular story, Napoleon III was so captivated with her that he presented her with a solid silver suit of armour for her performance as Romeo in Bellini's Romeo and Juliet, but likely he didn't see Vestvali perform (the premiere was attended by prince Napoléon-Jérôme Bonaparte instead).

Vestvali as Bellini's Romeo at l'Opéra in Paris, 1859.

With a French opera company, she made a tour through France, Belgium and Holland, and in 1861, performing in Wiesbaden, she met her longtime partner, German actress Elise Lund. She returned to New York in 1863, where Henry died that summer.

=== Switch to speaking roles ===
After negative reviews of her appearance in Gluck's opera Orfeo ed Euridice in New York in 1863, Vestvali moved into speaking roles, starting with the titular role in Victor Séjour's Gamea, or The Jewish Mother. Abraham Lincoln and Mary Todd Lincoln saw her perform this role in the January of 1864.

Karl Gutzkow suggested her in the preface to his play Richard Savage as a candidate for the leading role.

Vestvali as Hamlet, c. 1868.

She returned to Europe in 1867 (with adult Mary staying in America), following health problems and doctor advice to change to a different climate. She appeared as Romeo and Hamlet in Shakespeare's dramas. She played these roles in 1867 in London's Lyceum Theatre in English. Vestvali later claimed Queen Victoria attended a performance, but it's unlikely, considering Victoria avoided theatrical life while she was mourning her husband.

In the spring of 1868, Vestvali performed in Hamburg and Lübeck, always playing alongside Elise Lund in Shakespearean plays. Afterwards, she went on a two-year tour through Europe, bringing her now signature role of Hamlet to many cities. When the Franco-Prussian War started in 1871, Vestvali took a few months break. After the war ended, she rarely performed and retreated into private life. She built the Reichshallentheater theater in Berlin in 1873.

=== Final years ===
She spent the last years of her life in Bad Warmbrunn, where her sister Emma started building a villa quarter known as "Russische Kolonie”. During a visit to Warsaw, where her and Emma's investment of Vestvali Palace was recently finished, she fell ill and died on 3 April 1880, six weeks after her 49th birthday. During her last illness, she was "nursed by a Miss G", as well as her "inseparable friend" and principal heir, Elise Lund. Lund later took Vestvali's body to Bad Warmbrunn, where she was likely buried at the German cemetery by the modern Jagiellońska Street of Jelenia Góra.

== Bibliography ==
- Szarota, Piotr (2025). Felicita! psychobiografia Felicity Vestvali (1 ed.). Warszawa: Wydawnictwo Krytyki Politycznej. ISBN 978-83-68267-22-8.
