= Alessandro Amodio =

Italian opera singer

Alessandro Amodio (1831 — 22 June 1861) was an Italian baritone who had an active international career as an opera singer from 1852 until his death from yellow fever nine years later in 1861. After making his debut at the Teatro di San Carlo at the age of 21, he spent the next four years performing roles at opera houses in Italy, including La Fenice in Venice, La Scala in Milan, the Teatro Goldoni in Livorno, and the Teatro del Giglio in Lucca. He first came to the United States in the late spring and summer of 1855 with the Max Maretzek Italian Opera Company with whom he portrayed Count di Luna in the United States premiere of Giuseppe Verdi's Il trovatore at the Academy of Music in New York City on May 2, 1855.

After further performances in Venice, he was engaged by brothers Maurice and Max Strakosch to perform with their touring opera company in cities throughout the United States, including performances in New York, Chicago, and Philadelphia in 1856. He remained active as a performer in operas in cities throughout the United States and South and Central America for the next five years. He notably reprised the role of the Count di Luna on February 25, 1857 for the grand opening of the Academy of Music in Philadelphia.

== Life and career ==
Born in Naples, Italy in 1831, Amodio was the son of Raffaele Amodio. His father was the chief editor and director of the Giornali Officiali di Napoli. He began his musical education as a boy studying the flute. At the age of 18 he began to pursue professional music studies both as a singer and as a flautist. For three years he studied singing with voice teacher Giovanni Bisaccia (1815-1897) and the flute with Nicola De Giosa in his native city.

Amodio made his opera debut in 1852 at the Teatro di San Carlo. Just 21 years of age at the time, he shared the stage in his debut with Adelaide Borghi-Mamo and Antonio Giuglini. The success of this performance led to his engagement at La Fenice in Venice where he was engaged as a resident principal artist for three seasons from 1853-1856. During this time he also appeared as a guest artist at other opera houses in Italy, including La Fenice in Venice, La Scala in Milan, the Teatro Goldoni in Livorno, and the Teatro del Giglio in Lucca. One of his performances in Venice was attended by Maurice and Max Strakosch who engaged him for their touring opera company in the United States. He traveled to New York City from Italy in March 1856 to join their company. He had previously appeared in the United States a year earlier with the Max Maretzek Italian Opera Company; notably performing the role of the Count di Luna in the United States premiere of Giuseppe Verdi's Il trovatore at the Academy of Music in New York City on May 2, 1855.

With the Strakosch's opera company, Amodio toured for performance in cities throughout the United States. On February 25, 1857 he performed the role of the Count di Luna at the Academy of Music in Philadelphia; a production which marked the grand opening of that theatre. Other roles he performed on opera stages in the United States included Antonio in Linda di Chamounix, Don Basilio in The Barber of Seville, Germont in La traviata, Massetto in Don Giovanni, Papageno in The Magic Flute, and Pietro in Massaniello among others. In New York City he was heard frequently at the Academy of Music.

Amodio was engaged for three seasons as a principal artist at the Tacón Theatre in Havana from 1858 through 1861; performing there while on break from his appearances in the United States. He also performed at the Caracas opera house in Venezuela in 1860-1861. He contracted yellow fever while traveling by boat from Venezuela to New York City in June 1861. He died of that disease on June 22, 1861 while on the ship, and was buried at sea. His younger brother, the opera singer Francesco Amodio, was traveling with him at the time of his death. A requiem mass in his honor was performed at Saint Stephen's Church in Manhattan on July 13, 1861.
