= Academy of Music (Philadelphia) =

Concert hall and opera house

- The Grand Old Lady of Locust Street
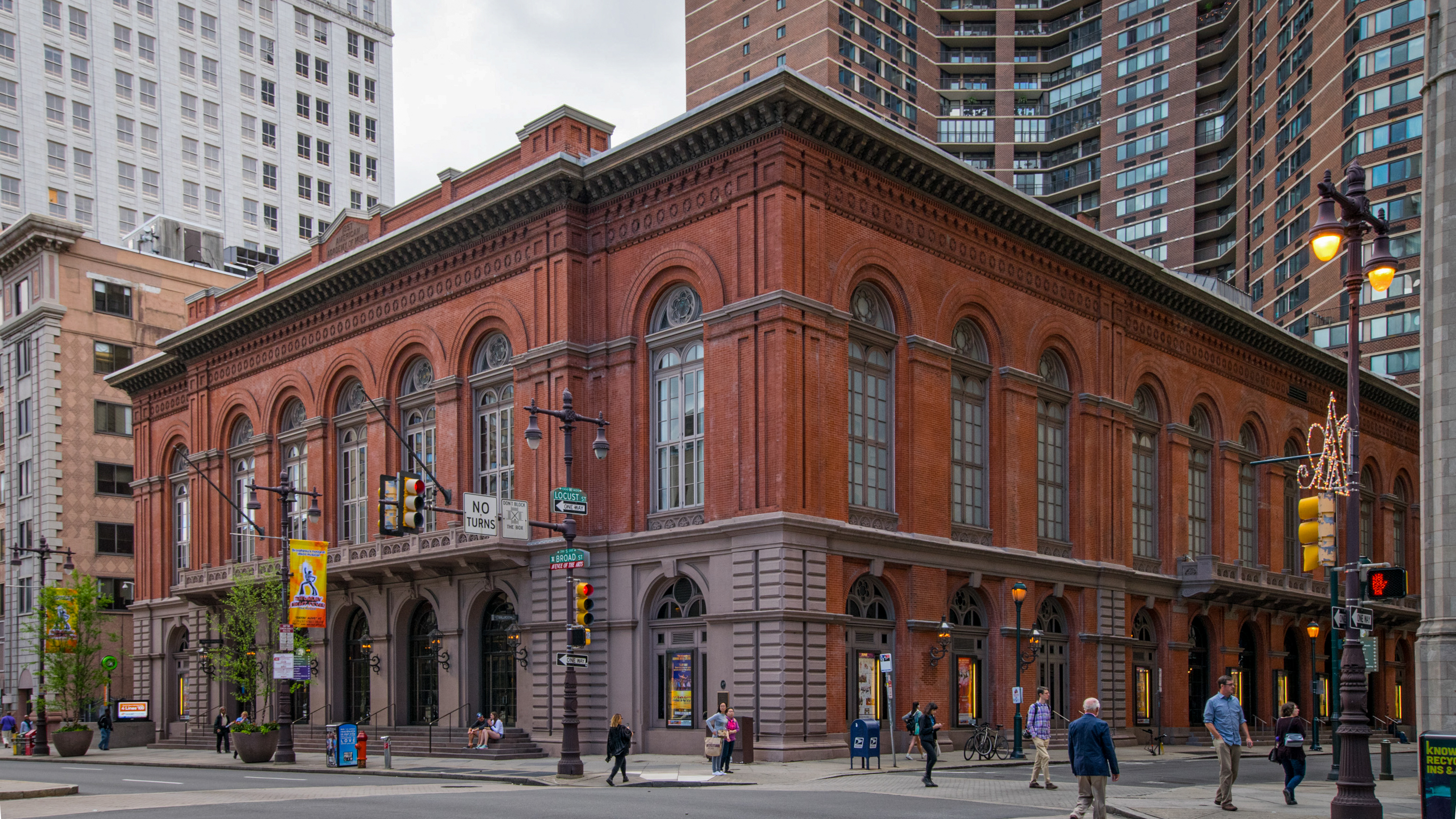
- The Academy of Music in Center City Philadelphia
- Interactive map of Academy of Music
- Address: 240 South Broad Street; Philadelphia, Pennsylvania; United States
- Owner: Philadelphia Orchestra and Ensemble Arts
- Operator: Philadelphia Orchestra and Ensemble Arts
- Capacity: 2,509
- Type: Opera house
- Public transit: Walnut–Locust: B 12th–13th & Locust 15th–16th & Locust: PATCO Speedline SEPTA bus: 4, 12, 27, 32

Construction
- Built: 1855–57
- Opened: 1857

Website
- www.academyofmusic.org https://www.ensembleartsphilly.org
- Academy of Music
- U.S. National Register of Historic Places
- U.S. National Historic Landmark
- Coordinates: 39°56′52.84″N 75°9′54.4″W
- Built: 1855–57
- Architect: Napoleon LeBrun & Gustavus Runge
- Architectural style: Rundbogenstil and Baroque Revival
- NRHP reference No.: 66000674

Significant dates
- Added to NRHP: October 15, 1966
- Designated NHL: December 29, 1962

The Academy of Music, also known as American Academy of Music, is a concert hall and opera house located at 240 S. Broad Street in Philadelphia, Pennsylvania. Despite its name, the Academy has never contained a music school. It is located between Locust and Manning Streets in the Avenue of the Arts area of the Center City district of Philadelphia.

The hall was built in 1855–57 and is the oldest opera house in the United States that is still used for its original purpose. Known as the "Grand Old Lady of Locust Street," the venue is the home of the Philadelphia Ballet and Opera Philadelphia. It was also home to the Philadelphia Orchestra from its inception in 1900 until 2001, when the orchestra moved to the new Kimmel Center for the Performing Arts. The Philadelphia Orchestra still retains ownership of the Academy, in partnership with Ensemble Arts.

The hall was designated a National Historic Landmark in 1962.

== History ==
=== 19th century ===
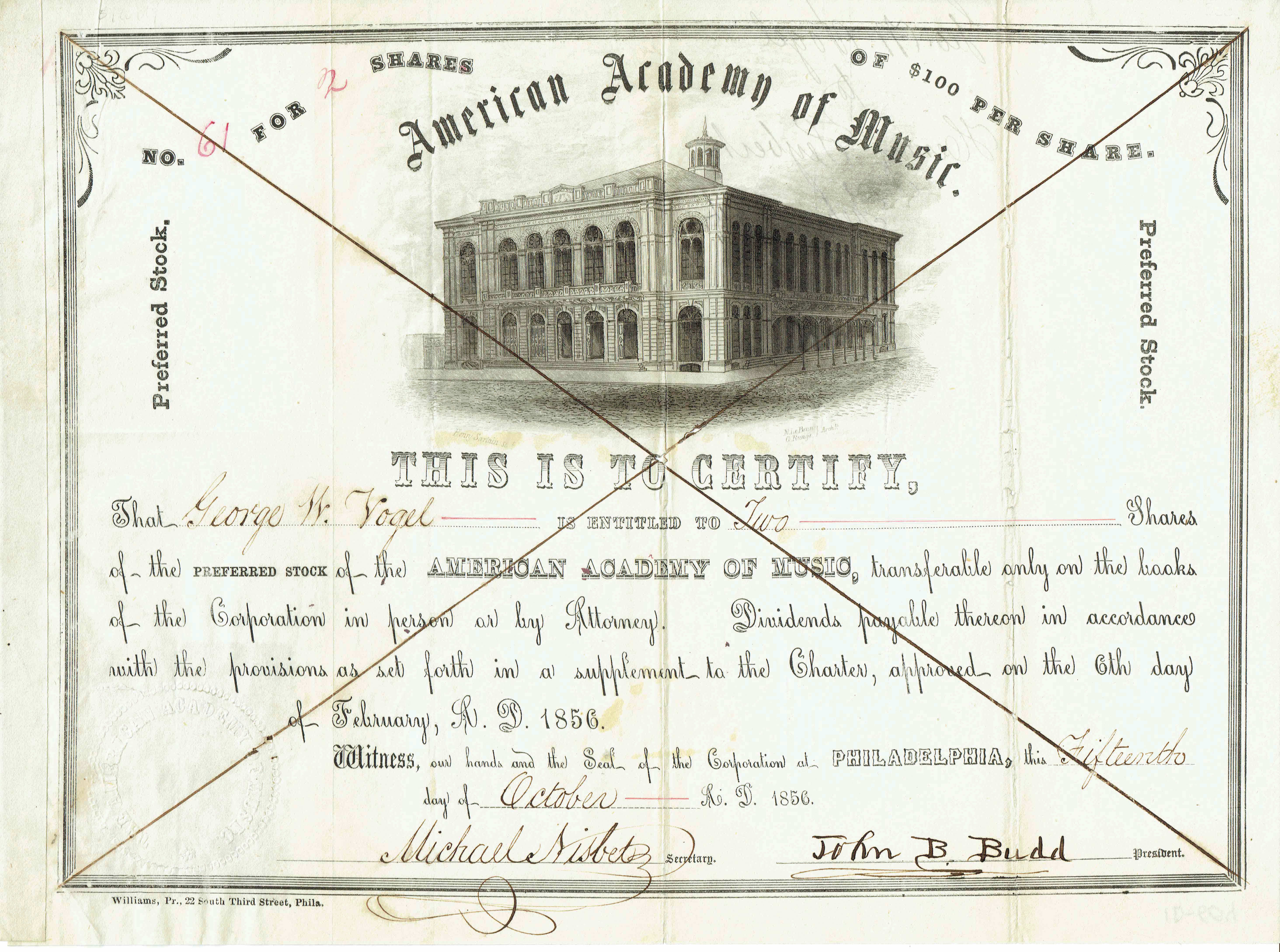
Share of the American Academy of Music, issued October 15, 1856

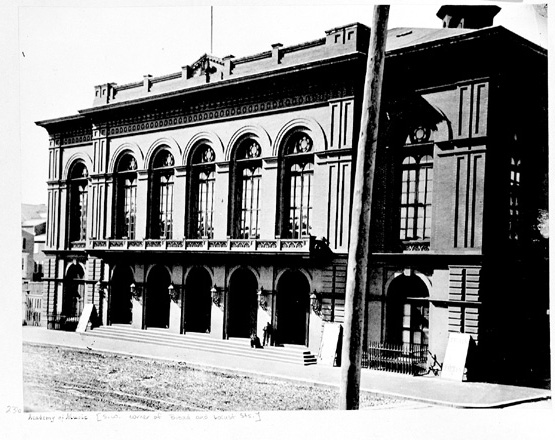
The Academy of Music in 1870

The Academy of Music held an inaugural ball on January 26, 1857. Following it, The New York Times described the theater as "magnificently gorgeous, brilliantly lighted, solidly constructed, finely located, beautifully ornamented" but went on to lament "all that lacks is a few singers to render it 'the thing'." The theatre had its first opera production, and what was billed as its formal opening, a month later on February 25, 1857, with a performance by the Max Maretzek Italian Opera Company of Verdi's Il trovatore starring Marietta Gazzaniga as Leonora, Alessandro Amodio as Count di Luna, Pasquale Brignoli as Manrico, and Max Maretzek conducting. Maretzek, who was already presenting operas at the Academy of Music in New York City and at the Chestnut Street Theatre in Philadelphia since 1850, brought his company back annually to the Academy of Music in Philadelphia through 1873. Due to his association with both the Philadelphia and New York City Academy of Music venues, his company was sometimes referred to as the Academy of Music Opera Company.

The Academy has been in continuous use since 1857, hosting many world-famous performers, conductors and composers, and a significant number of American premieres of works in the standard operatic and classical repertoire. Noted operas that had their American premieres there include Strauss's Ariadne auf Naxos, Gounod's Faust, and Wagner's The Flying Dutchman. In 1916, Leopold Stokowski conducted the Philadelphia Orchestra in the American premiere of Mahler's Eighth Symphony (the Symphony of a Thousand).

Outside of arts events, it hosted various public meetings, including the 1872 Republican National Convention.

An indoor football game took place here in 1889 between the University of Pennsylvania and a club from Princeton University, resulting in a 0–0 tie, appears to have been only the second football game played indoors. During the Philadelphia Phillies 1895 baseball season, the Academy offered an electric play by play scoreboard for all of the team's road games.

=== 20th century ===
The list of artists who have performed at the Academy of Music, from the 20th century, includes such figures as Marian Anderson, Maria Callas, Enrico Caruso, Aaron Copland, Vladimir Horowitz, Gustav Mahler, Anna Pavlova, Edith Piaf, Mario Lanza, Billie Holliday, Luciano Pavarotti, Tony Bennett (in 1962), Itzhak Perlman, Leontyne Price, Sergei Rachmaninoff, Artur Rubinstein, Isaac Stern, Richard Strauss, Igor Stravinsky, Joan Sutherland, and Pyotr Ilyich Tchaikovsky, and others.

Parts of Martin Scorsese's 1993 film The Age of Innocence were filmed in the Academy. Various voice and instrumental competitions have taken place there, including the Pavarotti competition.

=== 21st century ===
In the 21st century, after the Philadelphia Orchestra moved to the Kimmel Center, many non-classical artists performed at the Academy. Managed today by The Philadelphia Orchestra and Ensemble Arts, the space is used for a myriad of events, including Broadway, comedy, dance, family, jazz, and much more. It is also a backdrop of weddings, receptions, and corporate events.

The Academy is used as a filming location for HBO's historical drama television series The Gilded Age, standing in for the Metropolitan Opera House.

== Design ==
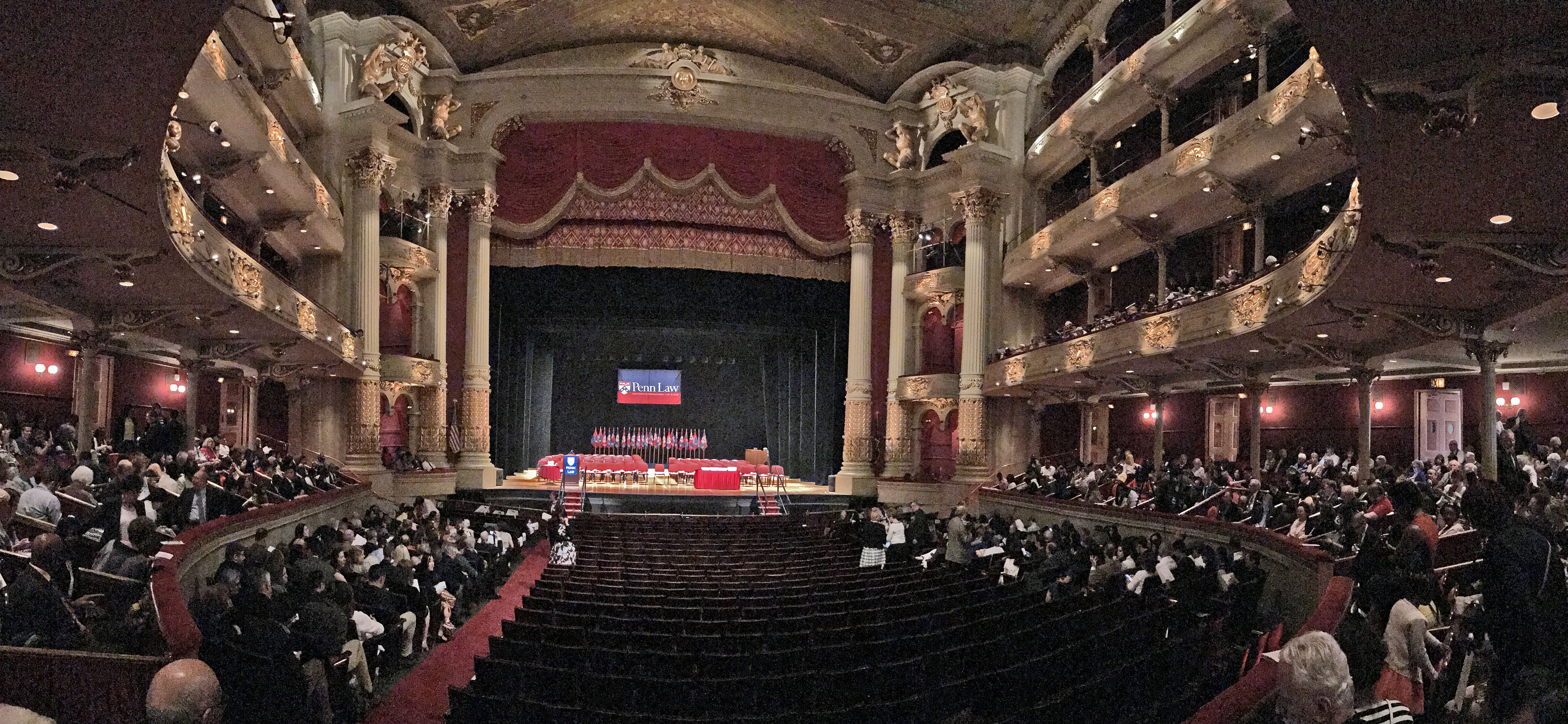
Interior, Philadelphia Academy of Music (University of Pennsylvania Law School graduation ceremony, 2017)

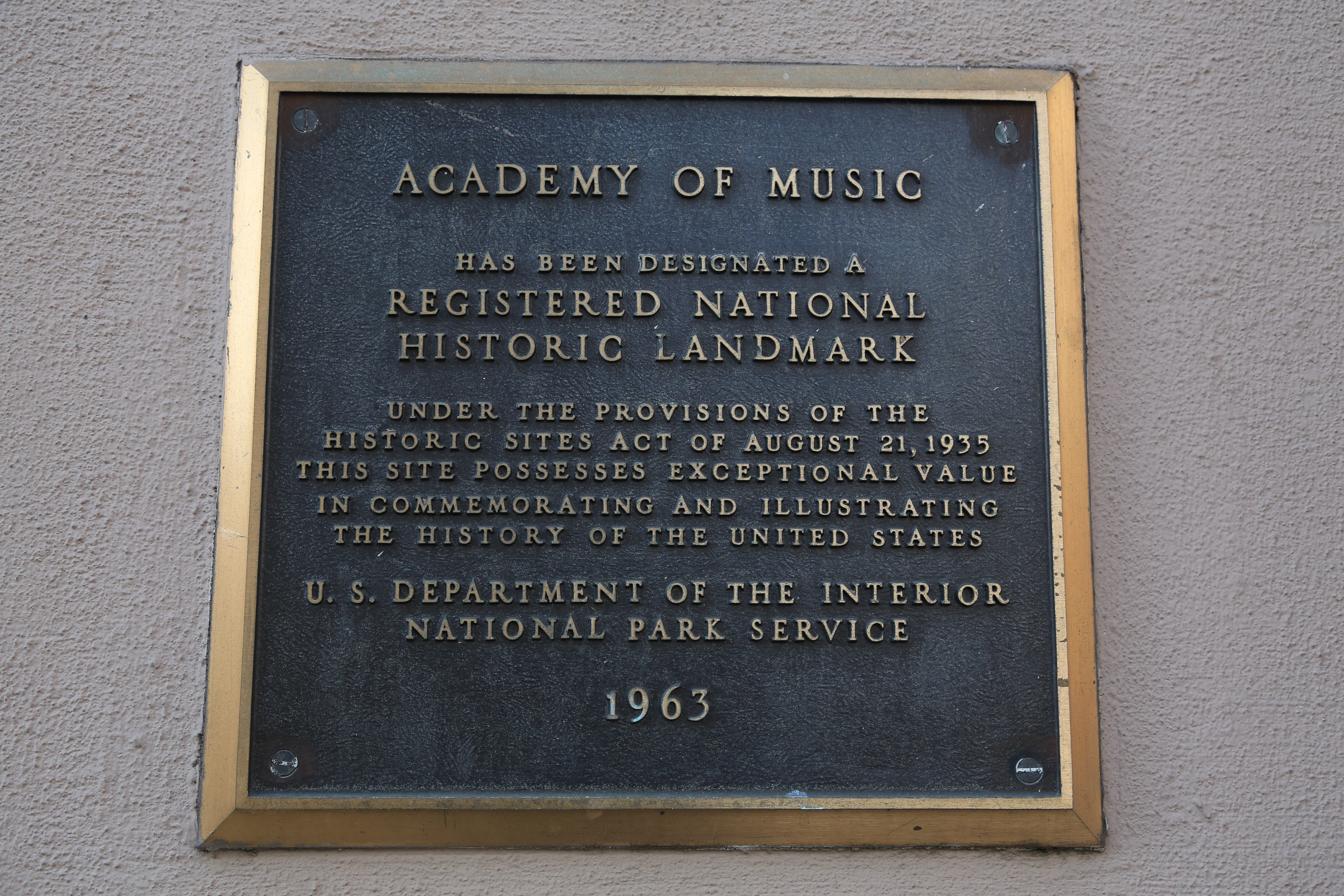
National Historic Landmark Plaque

An architectural competition for the Academy's design was announced in October 1854 and was won by the Philadelphia firm of Napoleon LeBrun and Gustavus Runge. A style of architecture that originated in Runge's native Germany now known as Rundbogenstil ("round arch style") was used for the exterior here and in a number of American buildings of the Civil War Era. The groundbreaking ceremony was held on June 18, 1855, with President Franklin Pierce in attendance and the venue opened with a grand ball on January 26, 1857. The first opera performed there was the Western Hemisphere premiere of Giuseppe Verdi's Il Trovatore, on February 25 of the same year.

In order to reserve as much of the budget for the interior as possible, the architects designed a relatively plain brick and brownstone exterior that could be clad in marble if funds became available later. The ornate auditorium has an "open horseshoe" shape and proscenium columns with elliptical cross-sections in order to provide more direct sight lines from the seats in the side balconies. The auditorium is enclosed by a solid three-foot brick wall with studding and pine boards lining the inner sides to prevent echoes and absorb sound. The upper balconies are recessed in a tiered fashion and supported by 14 Corinthian columns. An unusual feature was that the boxes were originally placed against the rear wall on the second and third levels (Balcony and Family Circle). They were divided from each other by walls that curved down from the ceilings. These have since been removed and boxes created elsewhere. The front of the first balcony is highly ornamented. The hall currently has a seating capacity of 2,389 which can be expanded to 2,509 when seats are placed in the orchestra pit and proscenium boxes. An 1860 account by Runge mentioned that the full auditorium, then nearly 3,000 persons, could be emptied in four minutes in "great calmness and order" owing to the wide corridors and stairways.

In 1947, it was reported by The Philadelphia Inquirer that, at the time, the venue sat up to 3,052 when 94 additional audience seats were added in the orchestra pit.

=== Interior ===
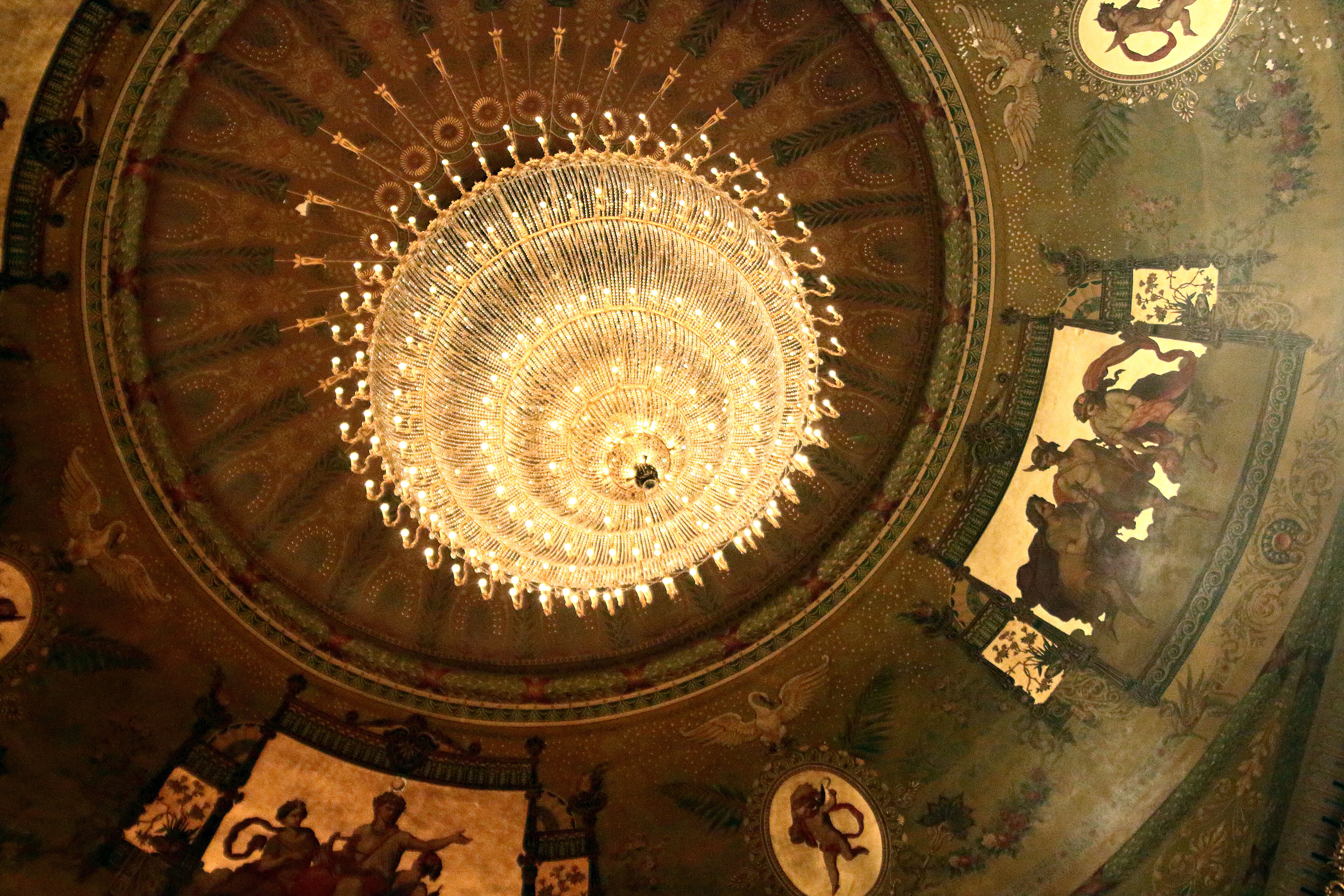
Chandelier and murals

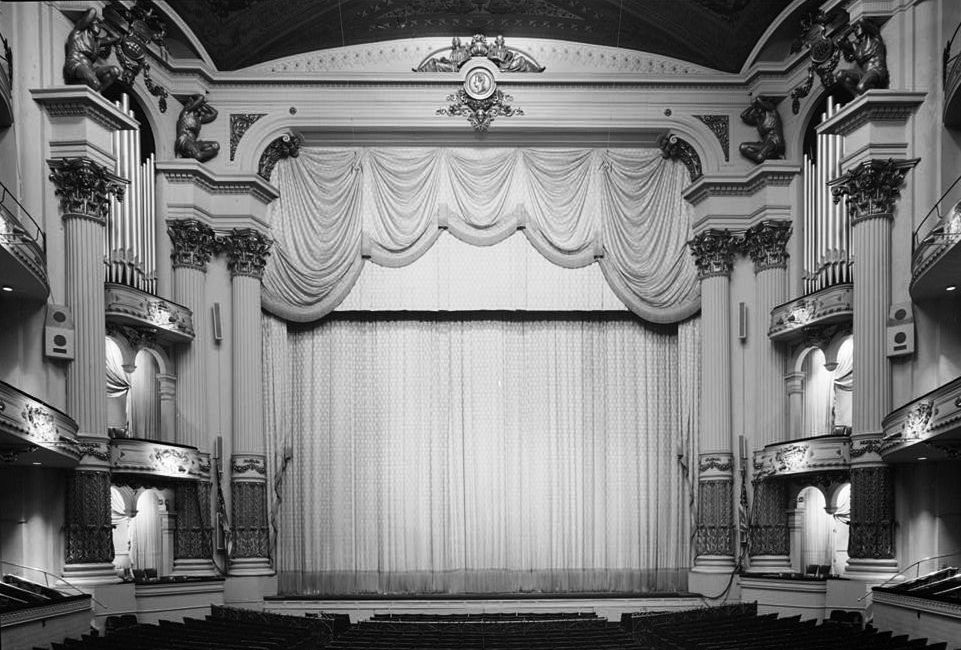
Proscenium wall and boxes. Architectural ornament by Charles Bushor and Joseph A. Bailly

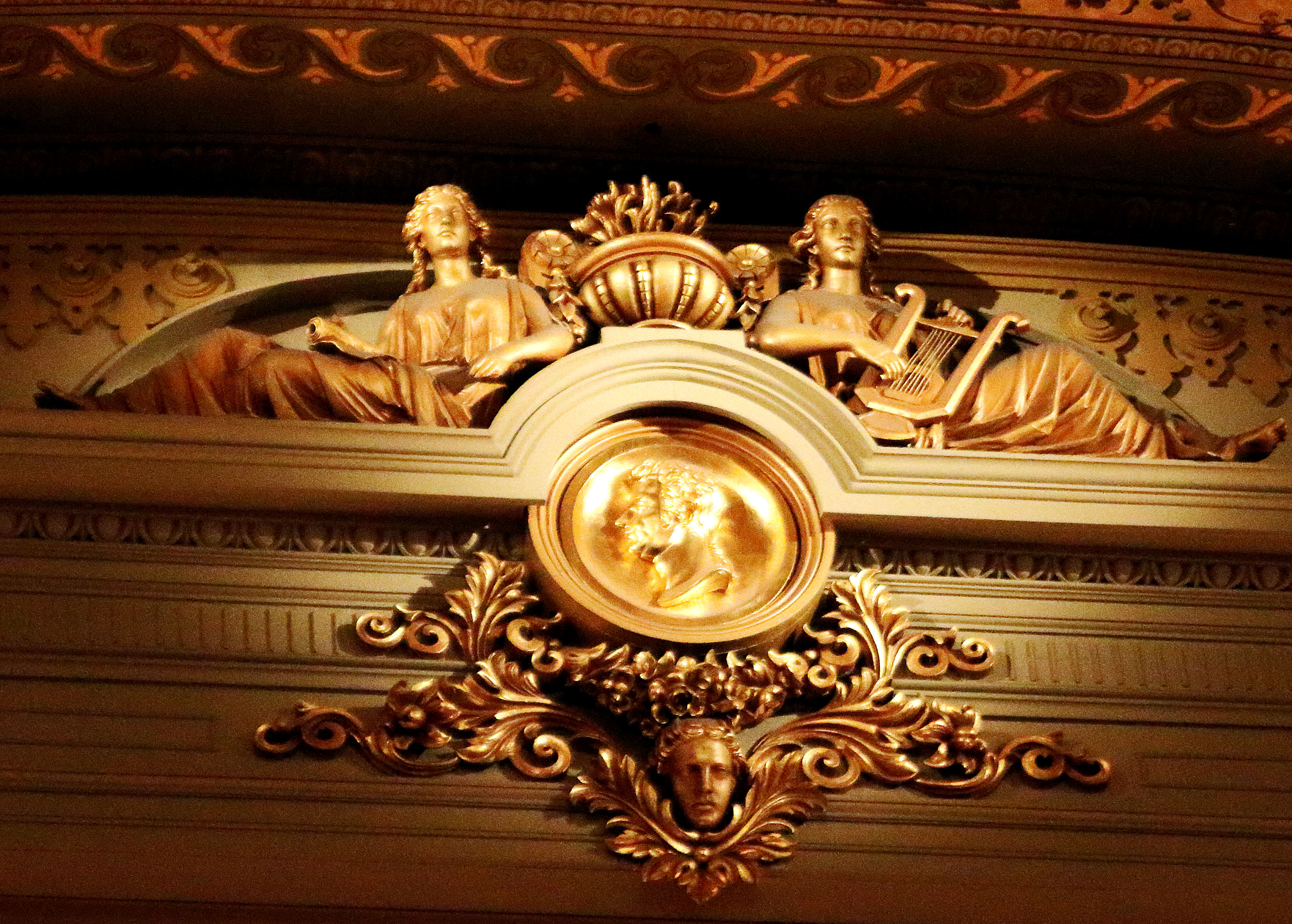
Bust of Mozart with figures of Poetry and Music

The interior might be considered an early example of American Baroque Revival architecture. The auditorium is graced by a large crystal chandelier, which measures 16 ft (4.9 m) in diameter, and weighs 5,000 lb (2,300 kg). When installed, the chandelier contained 240 gas jets, which were converted to electricity in 1900, and rewired in 1957. That same year, it was fitted with an electric-powered winch. It previously required 12 people working four-hours to lower it by hand. The fixture was restored to its original form and missing crystals replaced in 2008. The heat produced by the original gas fixtures helped to ventilate the hall by causing air to rise to various vents along the back walls and in the center of the ceiling.

Atop the proscenium is a bas-relief bust of Mozart. Seated on the cornice above are the figures of Poetry, on the left, and Music, on the right. The elaborate carvings and gilded wood sculpture decorations throughout the auditorium are the work of Charles Bushor and Joseph A. Bailly and the ceiling murals of allegorical figures were completed by Karl Hermann Schmolze. In the 1880s, the ceiling was enriched with additional painted decorations placed around the original murals.

The original front stage curtain was a painted representation of draped crimson fabric with heavy golden fringe, ropes, tassels, etc. by J. R. Martin of Berlin. A secondary curtain had a scene of Lake Como, Italy, painted by Russell Smith of Philadelphia.

The original seating on the Parquet and first balcony had arms and upholstery with springs and a covering of dark red plush fabric. The second balcony had "sofas without arms" and the third, pew-like seating. These were mostly replaced with more typical theater seating. The installation of more spacious seating began in 2018.

A 2007 donation of US$5.3 million by Leonore Annenberg was designated for restoration of the Academy's ballroom. This was part of the almost US$12 million in donations raised at the 150th anniversary concert for the Academy of Music.

=== Acoustics ===
For many decades, Philadelphia regarded the Academy as having excellent acoustics that were wrongly attributed to a circular brick chamber under the floor of the auditorium. It was intended by the architects that sound penetrating the "elastic floor" would reverberate in this chamber and emerge into the auditorium. Unfortunately, this device was ineffective as little sound could pass through the floor in either direction. The ceiling of the auditorium was deliberately designed not to be a sound reflector for fear of echoes.

Assessments of the Academy's acoustics have varied over time. Leo Beranek described the Academy in his 1962 book Music, Acoustics and Architecture as among the best concert halls in the United States and among the best concert halls. Later, conductor Riccardo Muti criticized the hall's acoustics as too dry for orchestral performances and better suited to opera. Architectural acoustics consultant Christopher N. Brooks similarly described the Academy's acoustics as dry and unsuitable for orchestral performances attributing the low reverberation in part to sound absorption by the approximately 2,900 audience members.

The Academy was built as an opera house which typically has a lower reverberation than a concert hall, the venue's primary use for many years. The reverberation time has been measured at 1.4 seconds compared to 1.2 at La Scala, Milan, and 1.75 at the Metropolitan Opera in New York City. Consequently, the "Philadelphia Sound" of the Philadelphia Orchestra was, at least in part, the result of long-term efforts by Stokowski, later sustained by Eugene Ormandy, to compensate for this weakness. After some remodeling in the mid-1950s that included concrete under the stage to support a pipe organ, Ormandy refused to make recordings with the Philadelphia Orchestra in the Academy. Riccardo Muti, Ormandy's successor, also made his commercial recordings with the orchestra elsewhere.

Various conductors have commented on the quality of the orchestral sound in the hall, as collected by Leo L. Beranek in his book Music, Acoustics & Architecture:

- Fritz Reiner commented: "The Academy has very good acoustics although somewhat dry. It is like an Italian opera house."
- Pierre Monteux: "This hall is too dry; the tone stops instantly. The sound should have a more flattering carry-over."
- Herbert von Karajan: "There is good orchestral balance, but the sound is too small. One doesn't get full power from the climaxes."'

Extensive renovations beginning in 1994 have maintained the building's architecture and made acoustic improvements. Although many programs at the hall are amplified and the Academy is no longer home to the Philadelphia Orchestra, the opera, ballet and other classical concerts still rely on the hall's native acoustics, alongside Broadway presentations, jazz, comedy, family-friendly programs, and much more.

== See also ==
- List of National Historic Landmarks in Philadelphia
- National Register of Historic Places listings in Center City, Philadelphia
