= Fanny Janauschek =

American actress (1829–1904)

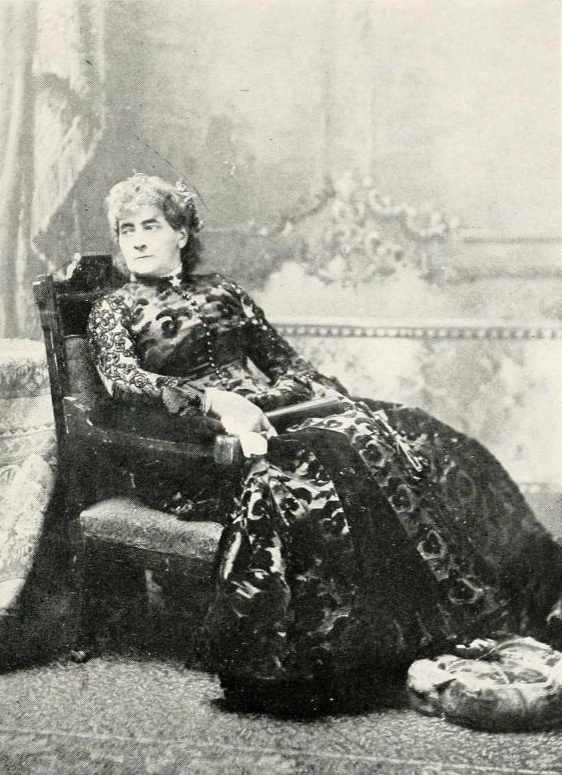
- Born: Franziska Romana Magdalena Janauschek; July 20, 1829; Prague, Austrian Empire
- Died: November 28, 1904 (aged 75); Amityville, New York, United States
- Other name: Madame Fanny Janauschek
- Occupation: Actress
- Years active: 1867–1904
- Spouse: Baron Frederick J. Pillot,1854 (died 1884)

Fanny Janauschek (born Francesca Romana Magdalena Janauschek; July 20, 1829 – November 28, 1904) was a Czech-born American stage actress.

== Biography ==
Francesca Romana Magdalena Janauschek was born on July 20, 1829, in Prague. Her mother worked as a theatre laundress and her father as a tailor.

She came to the United States in 1867 and first performed at the Academy of Music in New York City, on October 9, 1867, managed by Max Maretzek. She spoke no English, only German and often worked with all English speaking casts.

In three years time since arriving in the U.S. she mastered enough English dialect to communicate with American audiences and decided to make America her home. Some of her performances, especially Medea, were compared to the revered Italian tragedienne Adelaide Ristori. Her performance of Medea by Franz Grillparzer inspired William Dean Howells to write his novel A Modern Instance. She became famous acting in great Shakespearean parts and other famous parts. She was particularly noted for playing Meg Merrilies, a role Charlotte Cushman made famous. In 1873, Janauschek starred in an adaptation of Charles Dickens's Bleak House, in which she played both the heroine Lady Dedlock and the murderous Mademoiselle Hortense.

She played this double role in touring companies for decades. In 1900, Janauschek had a stroke and was paralyzed. She died in 1904, partially blind and bankrupt. Friends and actors gathered a collection to have her buried properly in Evergreen Cemetery, New York City. Janauschek had no known offspring.
