= Max Maretzek Italian Opera Company =

Touring American opera company (1849–1878)

The Max Maretzek Italian Opera Company (sometimes referred to as the Italian Opera Company, the Italian Grand Opera Company, or Academy of Music Opera Company) was a touring American opera company that performed throughout the United States from 1849 to 1878. The first major opera company in Manhattan and one of the first important companies in the United States, it had a long association with the Academy of Music in New York City where it presented an annual season of opera from 1854 until the company's demise in 1878. There the company performed the United States premieres of Rigoletto, Il trovatore, and La traviata among other works.

The company also presented an annual season of opera at the Academy of Music in Philadelphia from 1857 to 1873, in addition to touring throughout the United States and to Cuba and Mexico. Musicologist George Whitney Martin described the company as the only opera company in the United States to perform with a full opera orchestra during the Civil War era and as "possibly the country's strongest" opera company in its day.

== History ==
The Max Maretzek Italian Opera Company was founded in 1849 by impresario Max Maretzek, a Czech violinist and composer who had previously served as the chorus master and an assistant conductor at the Royal Opera House in London from 1844 to 1848, and had come to America in 1848 to become the music director of the Astor Opera House in New York City. Dissatisfied with the singers at Astor, Maretzek went to Europe to create a second company of singers, initially to provide one season of operatic entertainment in 1849–1850 for performances in Boston and at the Astor Opera House. Maretzek described his hand picked group of European artists as vastly superior to the resident artists that were currently engaged at the Astor Opera House, and it was this group that ultimately became the Max Maretzek Italian Opera Company. The group of singers was led by soprano Teresa Parodi, whom Maretzek selected in hopes of rivaling P. T. Barnum's prima donna, soprano Jenny Lind.

After the Astor Place Riot on May 10, 1849, Maretzek struck out on his own with his hand picked company. The company initially tried to continue staging operas at the Astor Opera House, including the New York premiere of Anna Bolena on January 7, 1850 with soprano Apollonia Bertucca (Maretzek's future wife) in the title role. However, bad feelings from the riot kept audiences away and the company moved to the Castle Garden Theater in the summer of 1850. There the company notably staged the New York premieres of Gaetano Donizetti's Marino Faliero on June 17, 1851 and Giuseppe Verdi's Luisa Miller on July 20, 1854. The company also began touring outside of New York in 1850 making stops at the Chestnut Street Theatre in Philadelphia, the Holliday Street Theater in Baltimore, and to theaters in Boston. The company continued to tour throughout its history.

In 1851 Maretzek lost Parodi to his rival, Max Strakosch (brother of Maurice Strakosch). He counteracted by poaching several singers (including soprano Angiolina Bosio, bass Ignazio Marini, and tenor Domenico Lorini) from another rival, Jaime Nunó, whose Havana Italian Opera Troupe had just completed a season of work in Charleston, South Carolina and his singers were headed back to Europe without contracts. Maretzek purposefully cut short a scheduled tour to Boston for performances in Charleston and Augusta, Georgia in March and April 1851 for this purpose. Also in 1851 the company had presented the New York premieres of Donizetti's Parisina and Gemma di Vergy, Rossini's Semiramide, von Weber's Der Freischütz, and the world premiere of Maurice Strakosch's Giovanna Prima di Napoli. In 1852 the company toured for the first time to Mexico City where they performed the Mexico premiere of I Lombardi alla prima crociata. The company later returned to perform the Mexico premieres of Attila (1854) and Nabucco (1856).

On October 2, 1854 the Max Maretzek Italian Opera Company performed Bellini's Norma for the inauguration of the Academy of Music in New York City with Giulia Grisi in the title role and Giuseppe Mario as Pollione headlining the performance with Maretzek conducting. This theater remained the principal base for the company when they were not touring until the group disbanded in 1878. The company notably presented three classic Verdi operas in their United States premieres at that house: Rigoletto (1855), Il trovatore (1855), and La traviata (1866). The company also performed for the inauguration of the Academy of Music in Philadelphia on February 25, 1857, and presented an annual season of opera at that theater as well through 1873.

In 1855 Maretzek's company toured to The Boston Theatre to perform a season of opera which included the Boston premiere of Rigoletto on June 8, 1855. The company also performed that work for its San Francisco premiere in 1860. The company returned to the Boston Theatre in 1863–1864 to perform another season of opera which included the Boston premieres of Verdi's I due Foscari and Gounod's Faust. On September 24, 1856 the company performed the United States premiere of Meyerbeer's L'étoile du nord at the New York Academy of Music. In 1868 Maretzek's company merged with rival touring company, the Max Strakosch Italian Opera Company.

Other notable artists who performed with the company include Alessandro Amodio, Luigi Arditi, Cesare Badiali, Carl Bergmann, Pauline Colson, Marietta Gazzaniga, Isabella Hinckley, Clara Louise Kellogg, Salvatore Patti, Giorgio Ronconi, Lorenzo Salvi, Giorgio Stigelli, and Minnie Hauk.
