= Pasquale Brignoli =

American opera singer

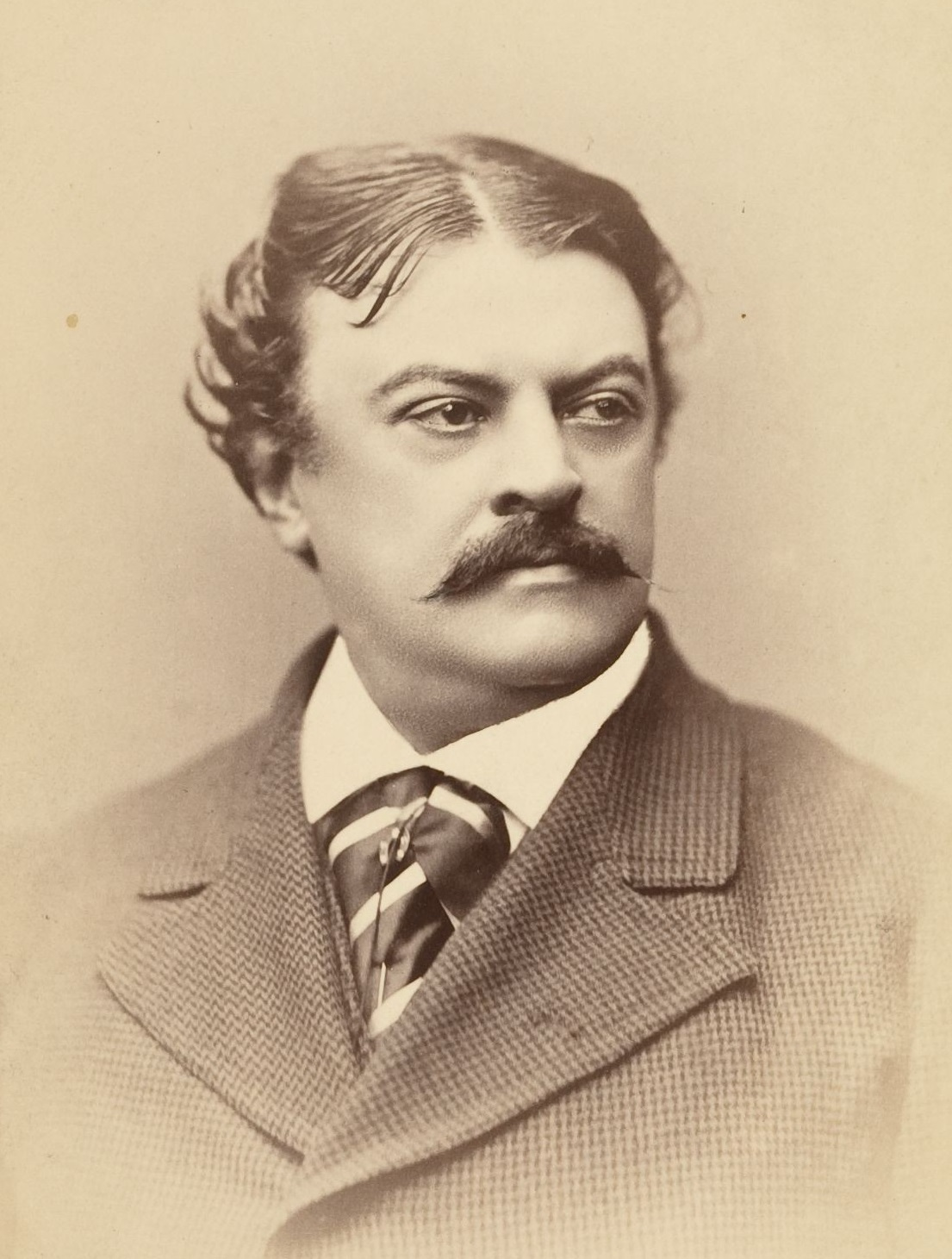
Pasquale Brignoli

Pasquale Brignoli (Pasquilino Brignoli) (1824 in Naples, Italy – 30 October 1884 in New York City) was an Italian-born American tenor.

== Early career ==
The son of a glove-maker, he received a fine musical education, and became a pianist of some ability. It is said that at the age of fifteen he wrote an opera, and, disgusted at the way in which the finest aria was sung, rushed upon the stage and sang it himself, to the delight of all. He paid little attention, however, to the cultivation of his voice until after he was twenty-one.

Little more is known about his early life because he was very reticent about it. During a civil hearing in New York in 1864 (Godfrey vs. Brignoli), he refused to divulge to the court what he had done before he became a singer. However, he told the court that he had started his singing career in 1850. Also in 1864 Brignoli sued a theatre manager for $15,000 when he was denied payment. The manager claimed he broke his contract and refused to sing on numerous occasions. When Clara Louise Kellogg once noticed that his ears were pierced, she speculated that he might have been a sailor at one time, but he never allowed anyone to discuss the matter with him.

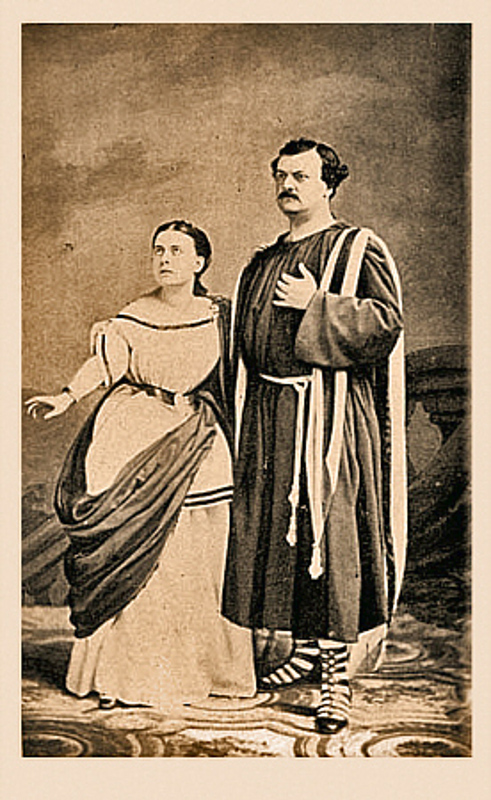
Brignoli with Marietta Piccolomini

It is said that his singing career began when Marietta Alboni heard him singing at a party and advised him to pursue a professional career. Success in the concert-room encouraged him to appear in opera in Paris and London. His operatic debut was in Paris in Rossini's Mosè in Egitto but he needed training and so he entered the Paris Conservatoire. After a period of study, he appeared in L'elisir d'amore in the role of Nemorino at the Theatre des Italiens. He is also recorded as having sung at the Paris Opera in 1854.

== American career ==
On the invitation of Ole Bull, he came to the United States with Maurice Strakosch in 1855, and soon attained a popularity that lasted almost to the end of his life. His American debut was as Edgardo in Lucia di Lammermoor (12 March 1855) and soon thereafter he sang Manrico in the first American production of Il Trovatore (2 May 1855). Other premiere American performances in which he appeared were La Traviata (1856), I vespri siciliani (1859) and Un ballo in maschera (1861), conducted by Brignoli's friend, Emanuele Muzio at the New York Academy of Music, as well as Luigi Arditi's La Spia (1855) and Betly (1861) at the Philadelphia Academy of Music. Brignoli's first appearance in Boston was on May 25, 1855, as Gennaro in Lucrezia Borgia.

His voice, on his best days, was a tenor of great volume and sweetness, and even in his sixtieth year he was still heard with delight in concert and English opera. He was unrivalled in grace of execution and facility in phrasing. However, he was severely criticized by some for his lack of dramatic skill. He supported Adelina Patti on her 1859 adult debut in the United States, and afterwards sang with Anna de la Grange, Parepa, Nilsson, Tietjens and many other celebrated artists. Brignoli made three trips to Europe but the United States became his adopted home.

In the 1870s, Brignoli, married soprano Sallie Isabella McCullough, and organized an opera company of his own which toured with great success and in which his wife made her operatic debut to a warm reception. Brignoli decided to take his talents back to Europe but the tour was not a success. His voice had begun to crack and he could no longer demand the large salaries that he had been used to receiving. He started to neglect his wife financially and emotionally and she returned to New York and filed for divorce. Brignoli returned for the hearing in which his wife prevailed. Shortly thereafter, Brignoli sailed for Liverpool, under engagement with Colonel Mapleson to sing at Her Majesty's Opera House in London and in other English cities.

Besides the reputed opera of his youth, Brignoli composed other works. One of his orchestral pieces, The Sailor's Dream, was played in Boston in 1868. He also composed songs and a piece titled The Crossing of the Danube which had live cannon in the style of Tchaikovsky's 1812 Overture.

Notwithstanding the large sums of money that he made by his singing, he died in poverty. Nevertheless, his many professional friends and colleagues flocked to his funeral in St. Agnes' Catholic church which was filled to capacity. A funeral march was specially composed for the occasion and played by the entire Seventh Regiment Band at Everett House, where the tenor died. The coffin was surrounded with white roses and other flowers, white doves, a broken column and a crucifix. The pall-bearers included Max Maretzek and several male opera singers. He was survived by a brother and sister who were living in Paris. Since that time, he has been largely forgotten, not even earning a listing in the Grove Dictionary of Music and Musicians or Oxford Music Online.

== Private life ==
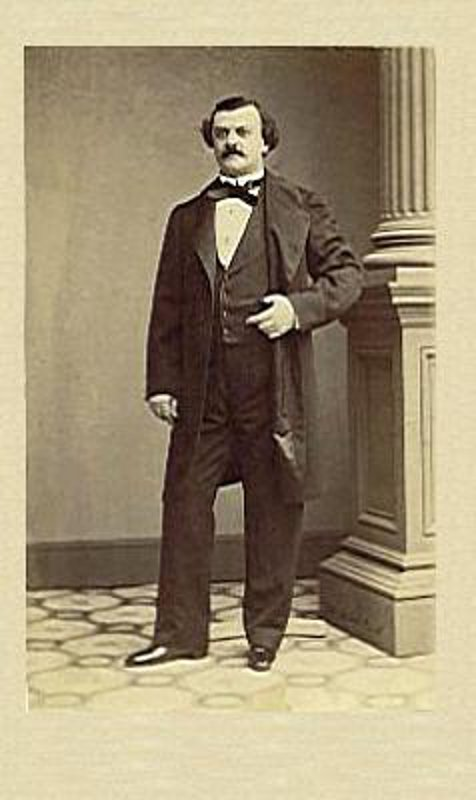
Pasquale Brignoli ca. 1860

Brignoli became immensely popular and women besieged him with amorous letters and propositions.

It was not infrequent at this time in the history of American opera for English-language songs to be inserted into operas. In 1879, The New York Times, remarked on the unintended humour in a performance of Don Pasquale, in which Brignoli was appearing at Wallack's Theatre, and into which he had interpolated what had become his theme song, Good-bye, Sweetheart, Good-bye. Brignoli was in the process of being divorced by his wife of nine years, Sallie McCullough, a soprano, whom he had met in 1869. She was from South Carolina and reported to have been very beautiful. The couple had eloped to Montreal and been married in a Presbyterian church without the knowledge of any of their friends. McCullough was from a respected Southern family and the couple were popular with New York society. At this time in his career, he was able to demand and obtain a large salary. In spite of this, Sallie was wretched at home. She described him as 'invariably cross' and that when business was dull, he vented his spite upon her.

When Brignoli went on his European tour in the 1870s, his wife accompanied him. The failure of the venture made him angry and abusive and their relationship intolerable. She also learned that he was being unfaithful. She returned to New York and filed for divorce. The charges made against Brignoli were "habitual cruelty, a neglect to provide for his wife, and adultery." The charge of adultery was proven to the satisfaction of the Referee and the judge issued a decree of absolute divorce. Brignoli sailed back to Europe the same day to complete his engagements in England.
