= Max Maretzek =

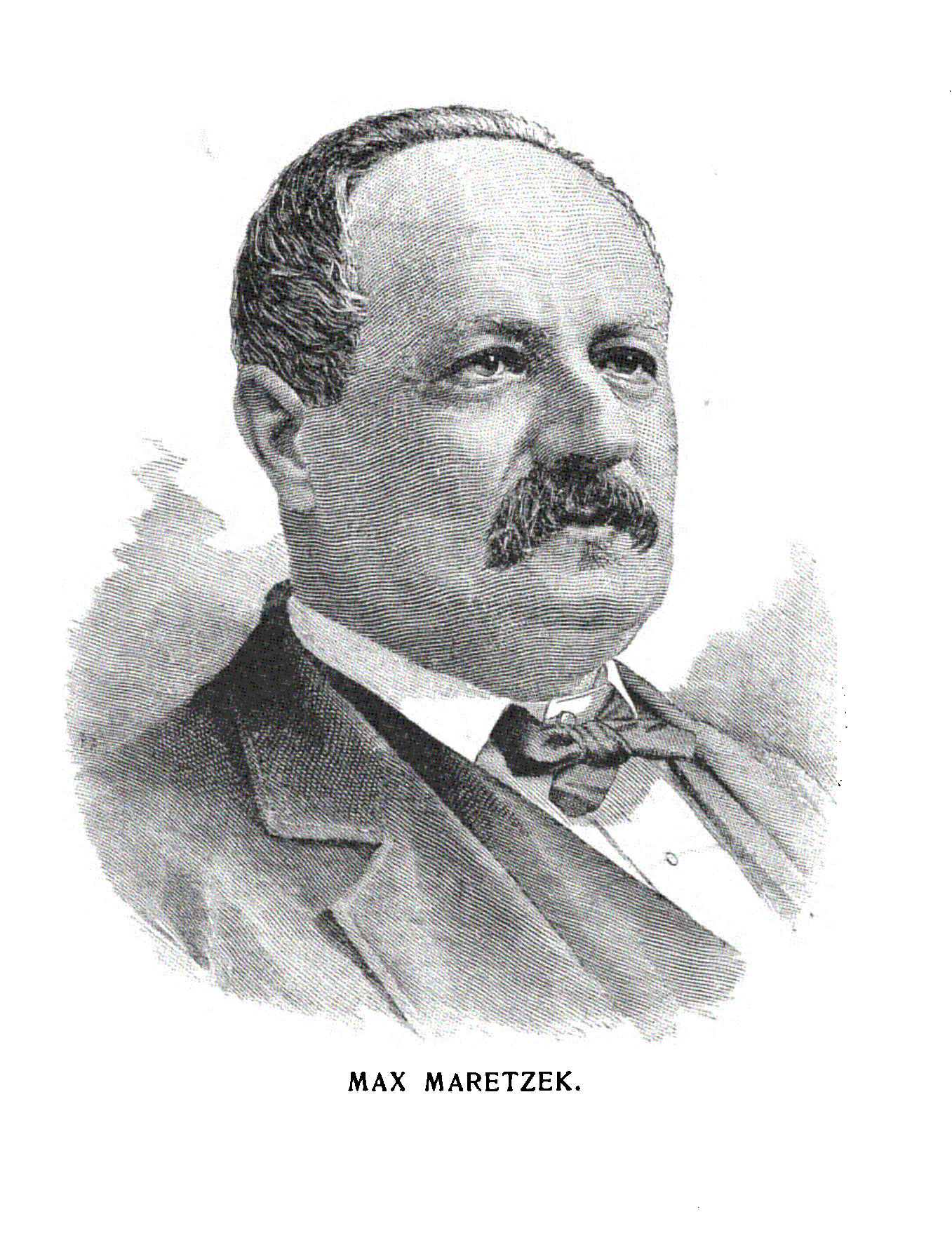
Max Maretzek

Max Maretzek (June 28, 1821 – May 14, 1897) was a Moravian-born composer, conductor, and impresario active in the United States and Latin America.

== European career ==
Born in Brno, now in the Czech Republic, he graduated from Vienna University and studied medicine for two years, at the same time taking a course in music and composition under Seyfried. He had breathed a musical atmosphere from his youth, and finally decided to devote himself wholly to its pursuit. The Emperor of Austria became interested in him, as did von Bülow, Wagner, Liszt, Offenbach and Strauss. In 1843 his first opera, Hamlet, was produced at Brunn. He played the violin in orchestras in both Germany and England. He then travelled through Germany, France, and England, as an orchestral conductor, and in 1844 settled in London as assistant to Michael William Balfe at Her Majesty's Theatre.

== American career ==
Coming to the United States in 1848, he became musical director at Edward P. Fry's Astor Opera House. In 1849 he began his career as an impresario at the same house with an opera company of his own, the Max Maretzek Italian Opera Company (sometimes referred to later as the Academy of Music Opera), which included most of Fry's artists. Between 1848 and 1850, he produced L'Elisir d'Amore, Il Barbiere di Siviglia, I Puritani, Belisario, Ernani, Otello, Maria di Rohan, Don Pasquale, and Der Freischütz.

In the 1850s Maretzek began to tour with his company throughout the United States, but was primarily active in New York City and Philadelphia. During the summer of 1850 Maretzek produced opera in Castle Garden Theatre, New York, producing Verdi's Luisa Miller for the first time in America. The Academy of Music was opened in 1854 with Giulia Grisi and Giuseppe Mario under Maretzek and his company. In 1855, Il Trovatore was produced by him, also for the first time in America, with Pasquale Brignoli as Manrico. He suffered a temporary setback with the arrival of Jenny Lind to America, as he lost audiences to her concerts. In 1856 Maretzek started an opposition to Niblo's Garden, with Clara Louise Kellogg. Adelaide Phillips, Pasquale Brignoli, and others. The competition was strong and neither side prospered. Although Maretzek brought out Giorgio Ronconi, one of the greatest baritones, he was driven to Philadelphia. In 1857 his company performed Il trovatore for the inauguration of the Academy of Music in Philadelphia. In 1860 he returned to the Academy of Music, and worked at Niblo's Garden in New York, the Crosby's Opera House in Chicago, and in Mexico and Havana. For a period in the late 1860s he managed the American career of newly arrived Czech actress Fanny Janauschek who early in her career spoke no English.

In 1889, his golden jubilee as opera director was held. The celebration was attended by such notables as Theodore Thomas, Anton Seidl, Frank van der Stucken, Adolf Neuendorff and Walter Damrosch.

Maretzek has been described as being possessed of a violent personality, dictatorial and intransigent, and was frequently in disagreement with members of his company and with critics. As a composer, he wrote two operas, Hamlet in 1843 and Sleepy Hollow in 1879. The first was produced in Germany, the second in the United States. He also wrote two volumes of memoirs, Crotchets and Quavers (1855) and Sharps and Flats (1890). He died in Pleasant Plains, Staten Island, New York in 1897.
