= Teresa Parodi (soprano) =

Italian operatic soprano

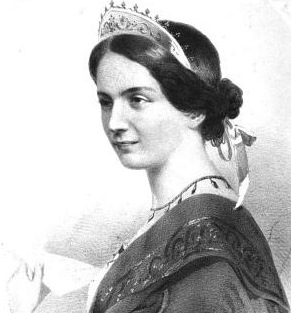
Teresa Parodi circa 1851

Teresa Parodi (27 August 1827 – after 1878) was an Italian operatic soprano who sang leading roles in Europe and in the United States where she achieved particular fame as the prima donna of both the Max Maretzek Italian Opera Company and the Max Strakosch Italian Opera Company. Admired for her acting ability and attractive stage presence as well as her voice, she was particularly known for her portrayals of the heroines in operas by Donizetti and Rossini.

== Biography ==
Parodi was born in Genoa to a family of modest means. At the age of 12 she began her musical education at the conservatory in her native city and later studied in Milan with Felice Ronconi. While in Milan she was heard by Giuditta Pasta who became both her teacher and her mentor. She made her stage debut in Bergamo in 1845 singing the title role of Donizetti's Gemma di Vergy, a role which she would sing many times in the course of her career.
