= Leone Emanuele Bardare =

Italian poet

Leone Emanuele Bardare (born Naples, c. 1820 – died there after 1874) was an Italian poet. He completed the libretto to Giuseppe Verdi's Il trovatore after the death (in 1852) of its original librettist Salvadore Cammarano. Bardare also crafted a new libretto, titled Clara di Perth, for Rigoletto in an attempt to placate the Neapolitan censors.
