= Maurice Strakosch =

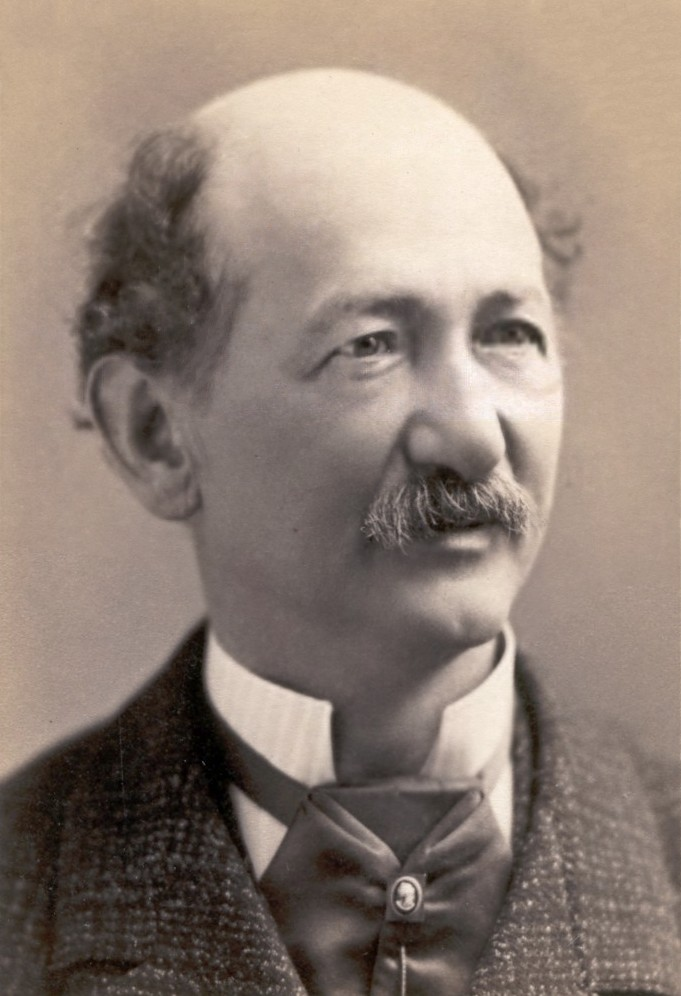
Portrait of Maurice Strakosch by Jose Maria Mora (ca. 1875)

Maurice Strakosch (probably 15 January 1825 – 9 October 1887) was an American musician and impresario of Moravian origin.

== Biography ==
Strakosch was born in Gross-Seelowitz (today Židlochovice), Moravia. He made his debut as a pianist at the age of 11 in Brno performing a piano concerto by Hummel. Because his parents were not satisfied with his career choice, he ran away to Vienna at the age of twelve, where he studied under Simon Sechter. He also studied singing under Giuditta Pasta for some time.

In 1843, he met tenor Salvatore Patti (1800–1869) at a music festival in Vicenza. Five years later, he was tour manager of Patti group in New York. These performances started his successful career as a manager in the United States and his long-standing friendship with the Patti family. In 1852, Strakosch married Patti's daughter Amalia Patti. He was also the first manager of the youngest and most successful daughter, Adelina Patti, from her debut in 1859 until her marriage in 1868. It is believed that Strakosch was her most important teacher.

In New York Strakosch was the manager of his own opera company from 1856 until February 1857, when he merged it with that of Bernard Ullman. The joint company produced operas at the Academy of Music in New York and toured the East Coast. Its last season was a "near-disaster", and it closed down in 1860.

Besides the Pattis, he and his brother Max (born in Brunn, Moravia, 27 September 1835; died in New York City, 17 March 1892) worked as impresario with Teresa Parodi, Christine Nilsson, Marie Heilbronn, Euphrosyne Parepa-Rosa, Carlotta Patti, Karl Formes, Pasquale Brignoli, Italo Campanini, Pauline Lucca, Thérèse Tietjens, Louis Moreau Gottschalk, Clara Louise Kellogg, Marie Roze and Marietta Alboni, as well as Nellie Melba.

Strakosch occasionally performed as a pianist, e.g. he played duet with Ole Bull during his tour in America. In 1857, his opera Giovanna of Naples (Regina Giovanna di Napoli) was performed in New York. His compositions for the piano were at one time very popular, and among them the music of one of Bayard Taylor's songs.

In 1886, he published a memoir book Souvenirs d'un impresario (Souvenirs of an Impresario). Strakosch died in Paris in 1887.
