= Il trovatore =

1853 opera by Giuseppe Verdi

- Opera by Giuseppe Verdi
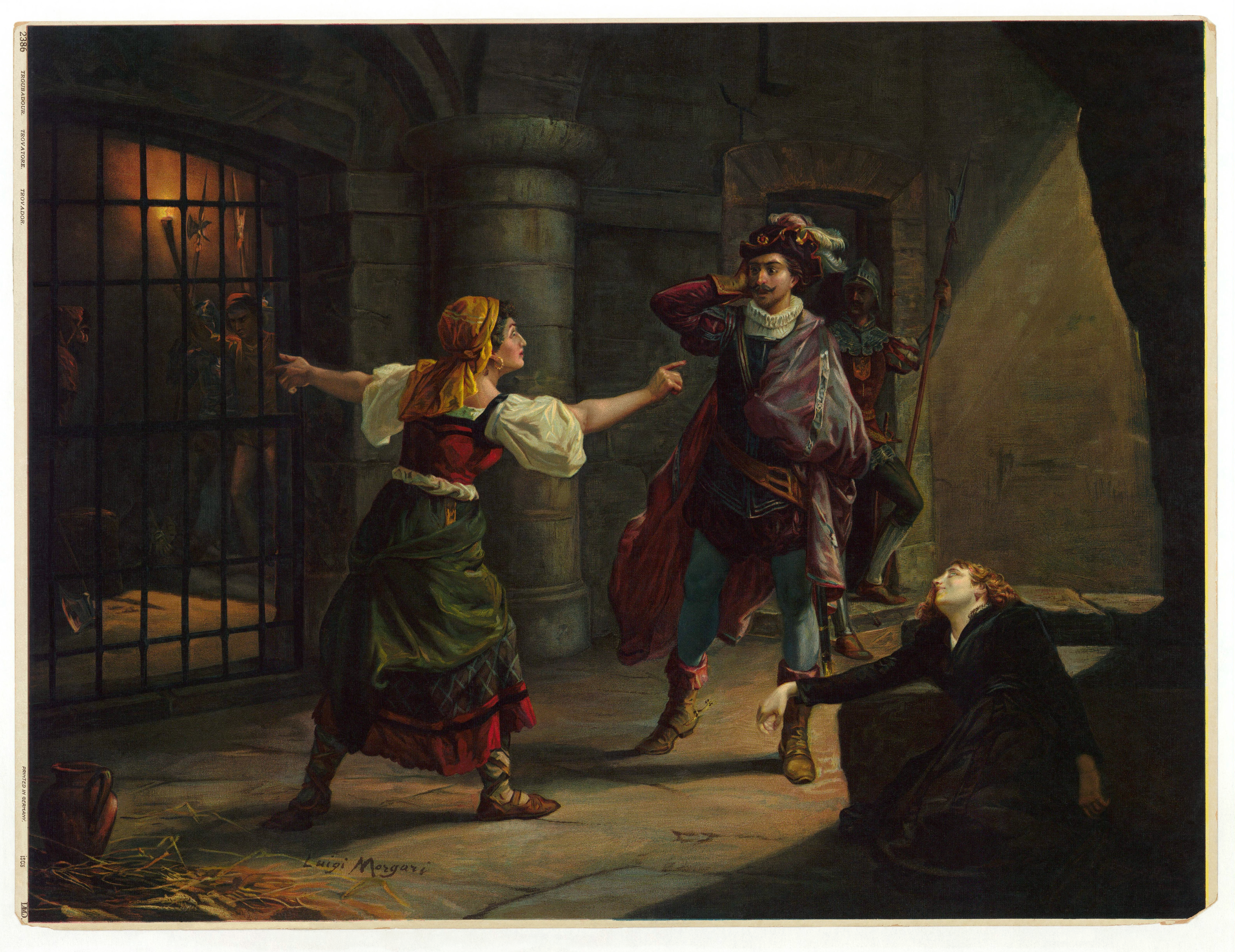
- Poster by Luigi Morgari
- Librettist: Salvadore Cammarano with additions by Leone Emanuele Bardare
- Language: Italian
- Based on: Antonio García Gutiérrez's play El trovador
- Premiere: 19 January 1853; Teatro Apollo, Rome

Il trovatore ('The Troubadour') is an opera in four acts by Giuseppe Verdi to an Italian libretto largely written by Salvadore Cammarano, based on the Spanish play El trovador (1836) by Antonio García Gutiérrez. It was García Gutiérrez's most successful play, one which Verdi scholar Julian Budden describes as "a high flown, sprawling melodrama flamboyantly defiant of the Aristotelian unities, packed with all manner of fantastic and bizarre incident."

The premiere took place at the Teatro Apollo in Rome on 19 January 1853, where it "began a victorious march throughout the operatic world", a success due to Verdi's work over the previous three years. It began with his January 1850 approach to Cammarano with the idea of Il trovatore. There followed, slowly and with interruptions, the preparation of the libretto, first by Cammarano until his death in mid-1852 and then with the young librettist Leone Emanuele Bardare, which gave the composer the opportunity to propose significant revisions, which were accomplished under his direction. These revisions are seen largely in the expansion of the role of Leonora.

For Verdi, the three years were filled with musical activity; work on this opera did not proceed while the composer wrote and premiered Rigoletto in Venice in March 1851. His personal affairs also limited his professional work. In May 1851, an additional commission was offered by the Venice company after Rigoletto's success there. Another commission came from Paris while he was visiting that city from late 1851 to March 1852. Before the libretto for Il trovatore was completed, before it was scored, and before it premiered, Verdi had four operatic projects in various stages of development.

Today, Il trovatore is performed frequently and is a staple of the standard operatic repertoire.

== Composition history ==
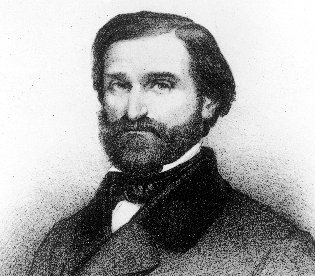
Verdi around 1850

How and when Verdi acquired a copy of the García Gutiérrez play is uncertain, but Budden notes that it appears that Giuseppina Strepponi, with whom Verdi had been living in Busseto since September 1849, had translated the play, as evidenced in a letter from her two weeks before the premiere urging him to "hurry up and give OUR Trovatore".

When considering setting García Gutiérrez's play, Verdi turned to work with Cammarano, "the born operatic poet" (according to Budden). Their correspondence began as early as January 1850, well before Verdi had done anything to develop a libretto with Piave for what later became Rigoletto in Venice. At this time, it was also the first since Oberto that the composer was beginning to prepare an opera with a librettist but without a commission of any kind from an opera house. In his first letter to Cammarano, Verdi proposed El Trovador as the subject with "two feminine roles. The first, the gypsy, a woman of unusual character after whom I want to name the opera."

With regard to the chosen librettist's strength as a poet in preparing verse for opera, Budden also comments that his approach was very traditional, something which began to become clear during the preparation of the libretto and which appears in the correspondence between the two men.

=== Relationship with Cammarano ===
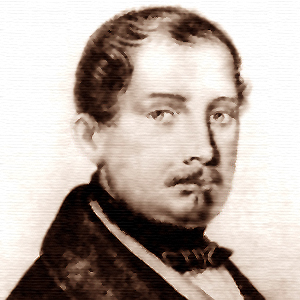
Librettist Salvadore Cammarano

Verdi's time and energy were spent mostly on finishing Rigoletto, which premiered at La Fenice in Venice in March 1851. Within a matter of weeks, Verdi was expressing his frustration to a mutual friend, Cesare De Sanctis, at having no communication from Cammarano. His letter emphasized that "the bolder he is, the happier it will make me," although it appears that Cammarano's reply contained several objections, which Verdi answered on 4 April and, in his response, he emphasized certain aspects of the plot which were important to him. These included Leonora taking the veil and also the importance of the Azucena/Manrico relationship. He continued by asking whether the librettist liked the drama and emphasized that "the more unusual and bizarre the better".

Verdi also writes that if there were no standard forms – "cavatinas, duets, trios, choruses, finales, etc. [....] and if you could avoid beginning with an opening chorus...." he would be quite happy. Correspondence continued between the two men for the following two months or so, including another letter from the composer of 9 April which included three pages of suggestions. But he also made concessions and expresses his happiness in what he is receiving in the way of verse.

During the period to follow, in spite of his preoccupations but especially after he had begun to overcome them, Verdi had kept in touch with the librettist. In a letter around the time of his intended departure for France, he wrote encouragingly to Cammarano: "I beg you with all my soul to finish this Trovatore as quickly as you possibly can."

=== Preoccupations and delays in 1851–1852 ===
There then arose the question of where the opera would eventually be presented. Verdi had turned down an offer from Naples, but became concerned about the availability of his preferred Azucena, Rita Gabussi-De Bassini. She turned out not to be on the Naples roster, but expressed an interest in the possibility of Rome.

Things were put on hold for several months as Verdi became preoccupied with family matters, which included the illnesses of both his mother (who died in July) and father, the estrangement from his parents with communications conducted only between lawyers, and the administration of his newly acquired property at Sant'Agata (now the Villa Verdi near his hometown of Busseto), where he had established his parents. But his relationship with his parents, albeit legally severed, as well as Strepponi's situation living with the composer in an unmarried state, continued to preoccupy him, as did the deterioration of his relationship with his father-in-law, Antonio Barezzi. Finally, in April 1851, agreement was reached with the elder Verdis on the payment of debts mutually owed and the couple were given time to resettle, leaving Sant'Agata for Verdi and Strepponi to occupy for the next fifty years.

May 1851 brought an offer for a new opera from the Venice authorities, and it was followed by an agreement with the Rome Opera company to present Trovatore during the 1852/1853 Carnival season, specifically in January 1853.

By November Verdi and Strepponi left Italy to spend the winter of 1851/52 in Paris, where he concluded an agreement with the Paris Opéra to write what became Les vêpres siciliennes, his first grand opera, although he had adapted his earlier I Lombardi into Jérusalem for the stage. Including work on Trovatore, other projects consumed him, but a significant event occurred in February, when the couple attended a performance of The Lady of the Camellias by Alexandre Dumas fils. What followed is reported by Verdi's biographer Mary Jane Phillips-Matz who states that the composer revealed that, after seeing the play, he immediately began to compose music for what would later become La traviata.

The couple returned to Sant'Agata by mid-March 1852 and Verdi immediately began work on Trovatore after a year's delay.

=== Death of Cammarano and work with Bardare ===
Then, in July 1852, by way of an announcement in a theatrical journal, Verdi received news of Cammarano's death earlier that month. This was both a professional and a personal blow. The composer learned that Cammarano had completed Manrico's third-act aria, "Di quella pira" just eight days before his death, but now he turned to De Sanctis to find him another librettist. Leone Emanuele Bardare was a young poet from Naples who was beginning his career; eventually he wrote more than 15 librettos before 1880. Composer and librettist met in Rome around 20 December 1852 and Verdi began work on both Trovatore and La traviata.

His main aim, having changed his mind about the distribution of characters in the opera, was to enhance the role of Leonora, thus making it "a two-women opera" and he communicated many of these ideas ahead of time via letters to De Sanctis over several months. Leonora now was to have a cantabile for the Miserere as well as retaining "Tacea la Notte" in act 1 with its cabaletta. Changes were also made to Azucena's "Stride la vampa" and to the Count's lines. Taking into account the last-minute requirements of the censor and the consequent changes, overall, the revisions and changes enhanced the opera, and the result was that it was a critical and a popular success.

== Performance history ==
In Italian as Il trovatore

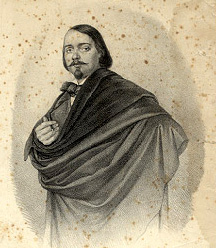
Tenor Carlo Baucardé sang Manrico

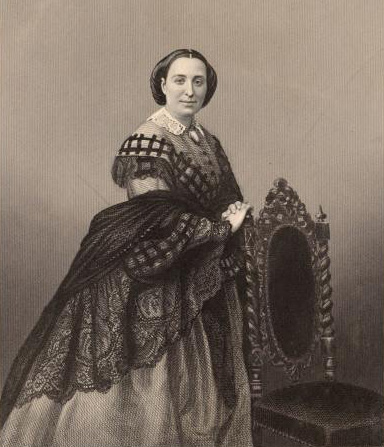
Soprano Rosina Penco sang Leonora

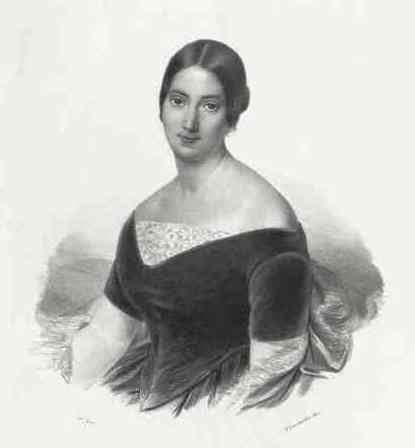
Mezzo Emilia Goggi sang Azucena

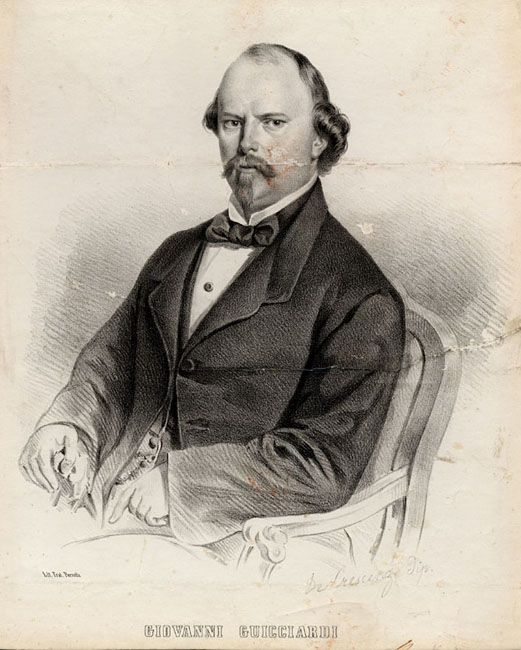
Baritone Giovanni Guicciardi sang di Luna

The opera's immense popularity – albeit a popular success rather than a critical one – came from some 229 productions worldwide in the three years following its premiere on 19 January 1853, and is illustrated by the fact that "in Naples, for example, where the opera in its first three years had eleven stagings in six theaters, the performances totalled 190".

First given in Paris in Italian on 23 December 1854 by the Théâtre-Italien at the Salle Ventadour, the cast included Lodovico Graziani as Manrico and Adelaide Borghi-Mamo as Azucena.

A few days after the Paris premiere, on 4 January 1855, Il Trovatore was first performed in Buenos Aires at the Teatro Argentino by the Pestalardo opera company. The cast included Ida Edelvira as Leonora, Luigi Guglielmini as Manrico, Matilde Eboli as Azucena, and Juan Carlos Casanova as the Count di Luna.

Il trovatore was first performed in the US by the Max Maretzek Italian Opera Company on 2 May 1855 at the then-recently opened Academy of Music in New York. The cast included Balbina Steffenone as Leonora, Pasquale Brignoli as Manrico, Felicita Vestvali as Azucena, and Alessandro Amodio as the Count di Luna. The work's UK premiere took place on 10 May 1855 at Covent Garden in London, with Jenny Bürde-Ney as Leonora, Enrico Tamberlik as Manrico, Pauline Viardot as Azucena and Francesco Graziani as the Conte di Luna.

As the 19th century proceeded there was a decline in interest, but Il trovatore saw a revival of interest after Toscanini's 1902 revivals. From its performance at the Met on 26 October 1883 the opera has been a staple of its repertoire.

Today, almost all performances use the Italian version and it is one of the world's most frequently performed operas.

In French as Le trouvère

After the successful presentation of the opera in Italian in Paris, François-Louis Crosnier, director of l'Opéra de Paris, proposed that Verdi revise his opera for the Paris audience as a grand opera, which would include a ballet, to be presented on the stage of the major Paris house. While Verdi was in Paris with Giuseppina Strepponi from late July 1855, working on the completion of Aroldo and beginning to prepare a libretto with Piave for what would become Simon Boccanegra, he encountered some legal difficulties in dealing with Toribio Calzado, the impresario of the Théâtre des Italiens, and, with his contacts with the Opėra, agreed to prepare a French version of Trovatore on 22 September 1855.

A translation of Cammarano's libretto was made by librettist Émilien Pacini under the title of Le trouvère and it was first performed at La Monnaie in Brussels on 20 May 1856. There followed the production at the Paris Opera's Salle Le Peletier on 12 January 1857 after which Verdi returned to Italy. Emperor Napoleon III and Empress Eugénie attended the latter performance.

For the French premiere, Verdi made some changes to the score of Le trouvère including the addition of music for the ballet in act 3 which followed the soldiers' chorus, where gypsies danced to entertain them. The quality of Verdi's ballet music has been noted by scholar Charles Osborne: "He could have been the Tchaikovsky of Italian ballet" he states, continuing to praise it as "perfect ballet music". In addition, he describes the unusual practice of Verdi having woven in themes from the gypsy chorus of act 2, ballet music for opera rarely connecting with the themes of the work. Several other revisions focused on Azucena's music, including an extended version of the finale of act 4, to accommodate the role's singer Adelaide Borghi-Mamo. Some of these changes have even been used in modern performances in Italian.

In 1990 Tulsa Opera presented the first staging of Le trouvère in the United States using a new critical edition by musicologist, conductor, and Verdi scholar David Lawton. Recorded live for broadcast on NPR, Lawton conducted the premiere with Margaret Jane Wray as Leonore, Craig Sirianni as Manrique, Greer Grimsley as Le Comte de Luna, Barbara Conrad as Azucena, and the Tulsa Philharmonic. This version was published by Ricordi and the University of Chicago Press in 2001. An updated version of this critical edition by Lawton was published by Ricordi in 2018, and given its premiere at the Festival Verdi in Parma that same year.

Rarely given in French, it was presented as part of the 1998 Festival della Valle d'Itria and in 2002 Le trouvère appeared as part of the Sarasota Opera's "Verdi Cycle" of all the composer's work.

== Roles ==
Roles, voice types, premiere casts
Role	Voice type	Original Italian version, Premiere cast, 19 January 1853 Conductor: Emilio Angelini	Revised French version, as Le trouvère, 12 January 1857 Conductor: Narcisse Girard
Conte di Luna, a nobleman in the service of the Prince of Aragon	baritone	Giovanni Guicciardi	Marc Bonnehée
Manrico, a troubadour and officer in the army of the Prince of Urgel	tenor	Carlo Baucardé	Louis Guéymard
Azucena, a gypsy, supposedly Manrico's mother	mezzo-soprano	Emilia Goggi	Adelaide Borghi-Mamo
Leonora, noble lady, in love with Manrico and courted by Di Luna	soprano	Rosina Penco	Pauline Guéymard-Lauters
Ferrando, Luna's officer	bass	Arcangelo Balderi	Prosper Dérivis
Ines, Leonora's confidante	soprano	Francesca Quadri	Mme Dameron
Ruiz, Manrico's henchman	tenor	Giuseppe Bazzoli	Étienne Sapin
An old gypsy	bass	Raffaele Marconi	Medori
A messenger	tenor	Luigi Fani	Cléophas
Leonora's friends, nuns, the Count's lackeys, warriors, Gypsies

== Synopsis ==
Place: Biscay and Aragon (Spain)
Time: Fifteenth century.

=== Act 1: The Duel ===
Scene 1: The guard room in the castle of Luna (The Palace of Aljafería, Zaragoza, Spain)

Ferrando, the captain of the guards, orders his men to keep watch while the Count di Luna wanders restlessly beneath the windows of Leonora, lady-in-waiting to the Princess. Di Luna loves Leonora and is jealous of his successful rival, a troubadour whose identity he does not know. In order to keep the guards awake, Ferrando narrates the history of the count (Racconto: Di due figli vivea padre beato / "The good Count di Luna lived happily, the father of two sons"): many years ago, a gypsy woman was wrongfully accused of having bewitched the youngest of the di Luna children; the child had fallen sick, and for this the gypsy had been burnt alive as a witch, her protests of innocence ignored. Dying, she had commanded her daughter Azucena to avenge her, which she did by abducting the baby. Although the burnt bones of a child were found in the ashes of the pyre, the father refused to believe his son's death. Dying, the father commanded his firstborn, the new Count di Luna, to seek Azucena.

Scene 2: Garden in the palace of the princess

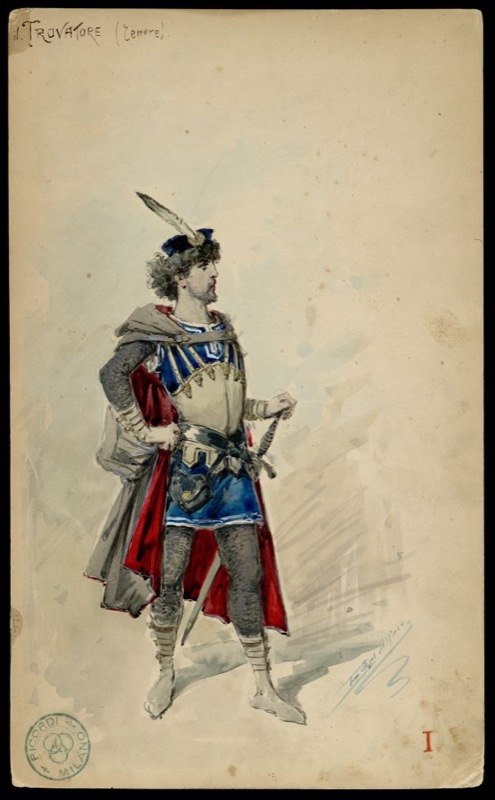
Alfredo Edel Colorno's sketch of Manrico's costume for a production at La Scala in 1883

Leonora confesses her love for the Troubadour to her confidante, Ines (Cavatina (Tacea la notte placida / "The peaceful night lay silent"... Di tale amor / "A love that words can scarcely describe"), in which she tells how she fell in love with a mystery knight, victor at a tournament; lost track of him when a civil war broke out; then encountered him again, in disguise as a wandering troubadour who sang beneath her window. When they have gone, the Count di Luna enters, intending to pay court to Leonora himself, but hears the voice of his rival in the distance: (Deserto sulla terra / "Alone upon this earth"). Leonora in the darkness briefly mistakes the count for her lover, until the Troubadour himself enters the garden, and she rushes to his arms. The Count challenges his rival to reveal his true identity, which he does: Manrico, a knight now outlawed and under death sentence for his allegiance to a rival prince. Manrico in turn challenges him to call the guards, but the Count regards this encounter as a personal rather than political matter, and challenges Manrico instead to a duel over their common love. Leonora tries to intervene, but cannot stop them from fighting (Trio: Di geloso amor sprezzato / "The fire of jealous love" ).

=== Act 2: The Gypsy Woman ===
Scene 1: The gypsies' camp

"Stride la vampa"
From act 2. Sung by Gabriella Besanzoni in 1920.

The gypsies sing the Anvil Chorus: Vedi le fosche notturne / "See! The endless sky casts off her sombre nightly garb...". Azucena, the daughter of the Gypsy woman burnt by the count, is still haunted by her duty to avenge her mother (Canzone: Stride la vampa / "The flames are roaring!"). The Gypsies break camp while Azucena confesses to Manrico that after stealing the di Luna baby she had intended to burn the Count's little son along with her mother, but overwhelmed by the screams and the gruesome scene of her mother's execution, she became confused and threw her own child into the flames instead (Racconto: Condotta ell'era in ceppi / "They dragged her in bonds").

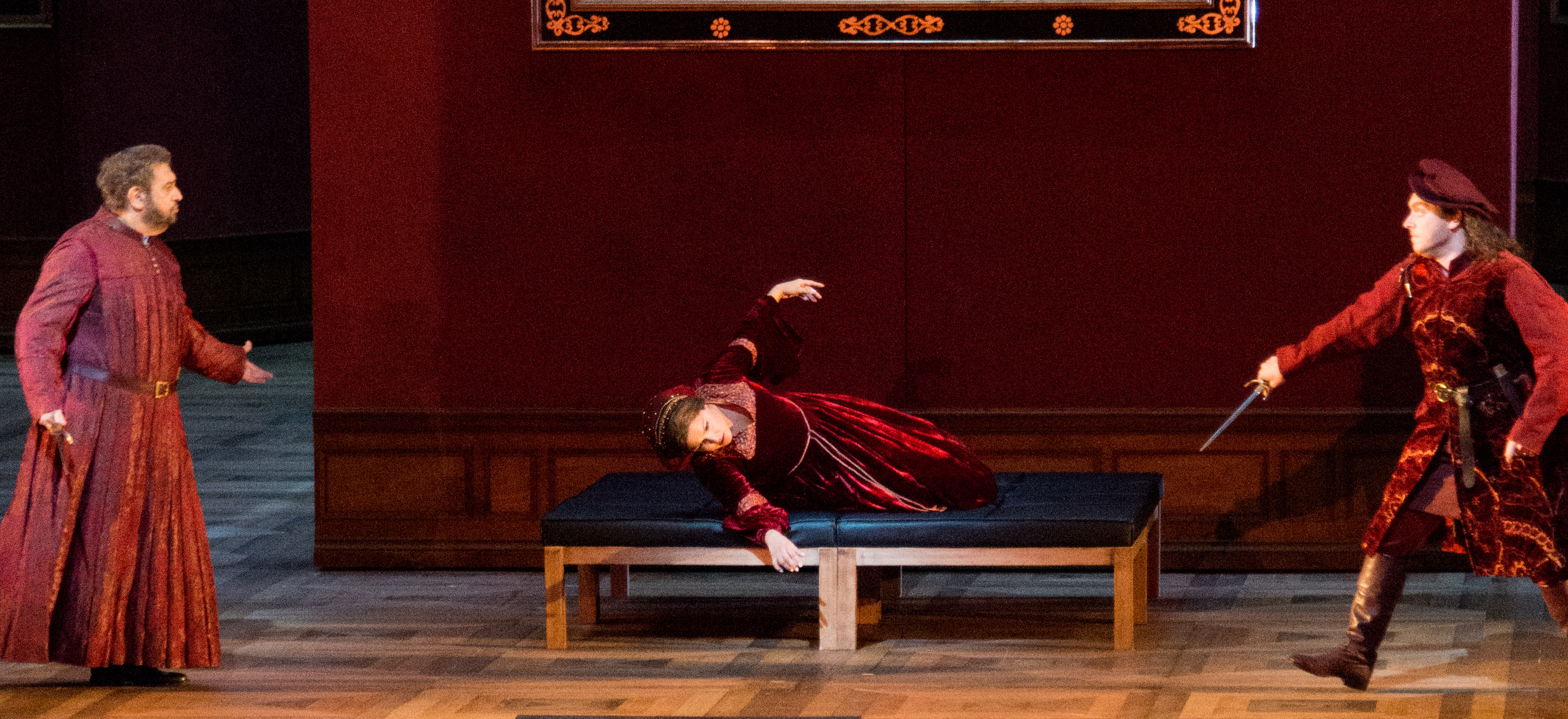
Plácido Domingo (di Luna), Anna Netrebko (Leonora), Francesco Meli (Manrico), Salzburg Festival 2014, act 2, scene 2

Manrico realises that he is not the son of Azucena, but loves her as if she were indeed his mother, as she has always been faithful and loving to him – and, indeed, saved his life only recently, discovering him left for dead on a battlefield after being caught in ambush. Manrico tells Azucena that he defeated di Luna in their earlier duel, but was held back from killing him by a mysterious power (Duet: Mal reggendo / "He was helpless under my savage attack"): and Azucena reproaches him for having stayed his hand then, especially since it was the Count's forces that defeated him in the subsequent battle of Pelilla. A messenger arrives and reports that Manrico's allies have taken Castle Castellor, which Manrico is ordered to hold in the name of his prince: and also that Leonora, who believes Manrico dead, is about to enter a convent and take the veil that night. Although Azucena tries to prevent him from leaving in his weak state (Ferma! Son io che parlo a te! / "I must talk to you"), Manrico rushes away to prevent her from carrying out this intent.

Scene 2: In front of the convent

Di Luna and his attendants intend to abduct Leonora and the Count sings of his love for her (Aria: Il balen del suo sorriso / "The light of her smile" ... Per me ora fatale / "Fatal hour of my life"). Leonora and the nuns appear in procession, but Manrico prevents di Luna from carrying out his plans and takes Leonora away with him, although once again leaving the Count behind unharmed, as the soldiers on both sides back down from bloodshed, the Count being held back by his own men.

=== Act 3: The Son of the Gypsy Woman ===
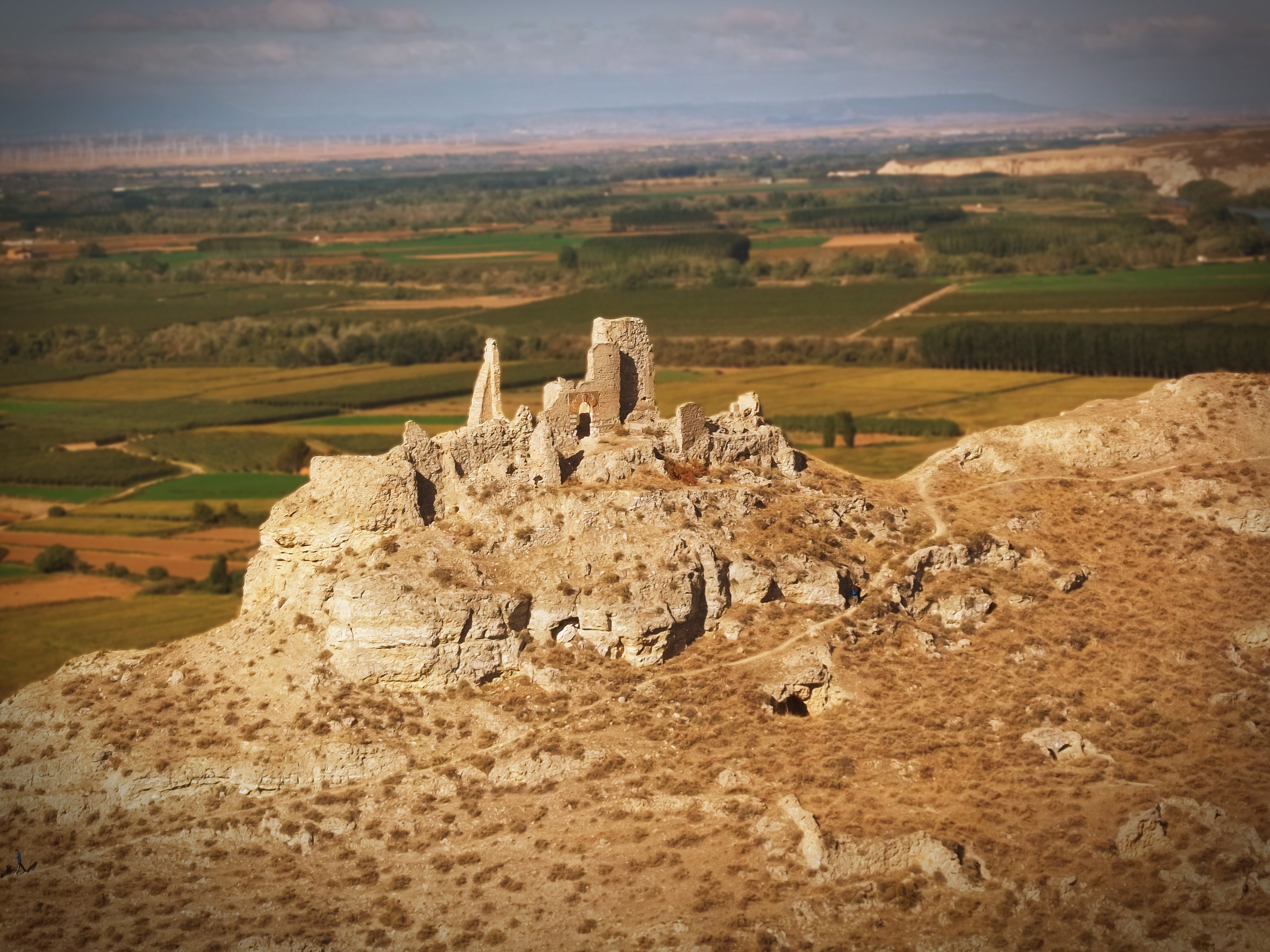
Today's ruin of the castle Castellar near Zaragoza

Scene 1: Di Luna's camp

Di Luna and his army are attacking the fortress Castellor where Manrico has taken refuge with Leonora (Chorus: Or co' dadi ma fra poco / "Now we play at dice"). Ferrando drags in Azucena, who has been captured wandering near the camp. When she hears di Luna's name, Azucena's reactions arouse suspicion and Ferrando recognizes her as the supposed murderer of the count's brother. Azucena cries out to her son Manrico to rescue her and the count realizes that he has the means to flush his enemy out of the fortress. He orders his men to build a pyre and burn Azucena before the walls.

Scene 2: A chamber in the castle

Inside the castle, Manrico and Leonora are preparing to be married. She is frightened; the battle with di Luna is imminent and Manrico's forces are outnumbered. He assures her of his love (Aria: Ah sì, ben mio, coll'essere / "Ah, yes, my love, in being yours"), even in the face of death. When news of Azucena's capture reaches him, he summons his men and desperately prepares to attack (Cabaletta: Di quella pira l'orrendo foco / "The horrid flames of that pyre"). Leonora faints.

=== Act 4: The Punishment ===
Scene 1: Before the dungeon keep

Manrico has failed to free Azucena and has been imprisoned himself. Leonora attempts to free him (Aria: D'amor sull'ali rosee / "On the rosy wings of love"; Chorus & Duet: Miserere / "Lord, thy mercy on this soul") by begging di Luna for mercy and offers herself in place of her lover. She promises to give herself to the Count, but secretly swallows poison from her ring in order to die before di Luna can possess her (Duet: Mira, d'acerbe lagrime / "See the bitter tears I shed").

Scene 2: In the dungeon

"Se m'ami ancor... Ai nostri monti ritorneremo"
Enrico Caruso and Ernestine Schumann-Heink (1913)

Manrico and Azucena are awaiting their execution. Manrico attempts to soothe Azucena, whose mind wanders to happier days in the mountains (Duet: Ai nostri monti ritorneremo / "Again to our mountains we shall return"). At last the gypsy slumbers. Leonora comes to Manrico and tells him that he is saved, begging him to escape. When he discovers she cannot accompany him, he refuses to leave his prison. He believes Leonora has betrayed him until he realizes that she has taken poison to remain true to him. As she dies in agony in Manrico's arms, she confesses that she prefers to die with him than to marry another (Trio: Prima che d'altri vivere / "Rather than live as another's"). The Count hears Leonora's last words and orders Manrico's execution. Azucena awakens and tries to stop di Luna. Once she finds out Manrico is dead, she cries: Egli era tuo fratello! Sei vendicata, o madre. / "He was your brother ... You are avenged, oh mother!"

== Instrumentation ==
- Woodwinds: piccolo, 2 flutes, 2 oboes, 2 clarinets, 2 bassoons
- Brass: 4 French horns, 2 trumpets, 3 trombones, cimbasso
- Percussion: timpani, triangle, tambourine, cymbals, 2 anvils, bass drum
- Strings: harp, violins (I and II), violas, cellos, double basses
- Onstage: French horn, snare drum, bells, organ, 2 harps

== Music ==
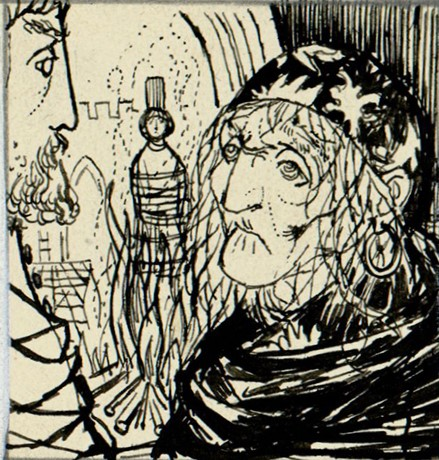
Drawing for Il trovatore (1956)

Today, most opera scholars recognize the expressive musical qualities of Verdi's writing. However, musicologist Roger Parker notes that "the extreme formalism of the musical language has been seen as serving to concentrate and define the various stages of the drama, above all channeling them into those key confrontations that mark its inexorable progress".

Here he, like many other writers, notes the elements of musical form (then often described as "closed forms") which characterize the opera and make it appear to be something of a return to the language of earlier times, "the veritable apotheosis of bel canto with its demands for vocal beauty, agility and range," notes Charles Osborne. Thus, the cantabile-cabaletta two-part arias, the use of the chorus, etc., which Verdi had originally asked Cammarano to ignore, are evident. But Verdi wanted something else: "the freer the forms he presents me with, the better I shall do," he wrote to the librettist's friend in March 1851. It was not what he received from his librettist, but he certainly demonstrated his total mastery over this style. Osborne's take on 'Il trovatore is that "it is as though Verdi had decided to do something which he had been perfecting over the years, and to do it so beautifully that he need never to do it again. Formally, it is a step backward after Rigoletto".

Budden describes one of the musical qualities as the relationship between the "consistent dramatic impetus" of the action being caused by the "propulsive quality" of the music which produces a "sense of continuous forward motion". Parker describes it as "sheer musical energy apparent in all the numbers". And Budden gives many examples which show Verdi as "the equal of Bellini" as a melodist.

Verdi also clearly recognizes the importance of the role of Azucena. Remembering that the composer's initial suggestion to Cammarano was that he wanted to name the opera after her, Budden notes that this character "is the first of a glorious line" and he names Ulrica (from Ballo), Eboli (from Don Carlos), and Amneris (from Aida) as followers in the same vocal range and with the same expressive and distinct qualities which separate them from the other female role in the opera in which they feature. He quotes from a letter which Verdi wrote to Marianna Barbieri-Nini, the soprano who was due to sing the Leonora in Venice after the premiere, and who expressed reservations about her music. Here, Verdi emphasizes the importance of the role of Azucena:

..it's a principal, the principal role; finer and more dramatic and more original than the other. If I were a prima donna (a fine thing that would be!), I would always rather sing the part of the Gypsy in Il trovatore.

From this position, Budden comments on the distinct differences in an era where vocal registers were less defined and which extend into Leonora's and Azucena's music "where greater verbal projection of the lower voice [can be] turned to advantage" and where "the polarity between the two female roles [extends] into every field of comparison." He then sums up the musical relationship which exists between the two female characters, the men having simply been defined as being representative of their own voice types, something evident and very striking in Verdi's significant use of voice types in Ernani of 1844. Regarding Leonora, Budden describes her music as "mov[ing] in long phrases most characterized by a soaring 'aspiring' quality" whereas "Azucena's melodies evolve in short, often commonplace phrases based on the repetition of short rhythmic patterns".

== Cultural references ==
Enrico Caruso once said that all it takes for a successful performance of Il trovatore is the four greatest singers in the world. On many occasions, this opera and its music have been featured in various forms of popular culture and entertainment. Scenes of comic chaos play out over a performance of Il trovatore in the Marx Brothers film A Night at the Opera (including a quotation, in the middle of the act 1 overture, of Take Me Out to the Ball Game). Luchino Visconti used a performance of Il trovatore at La Fenice opera house for the opening sequence of his 1954 film Senso. As Manrico sings his battle cry in "Di quella pira", the performance is interrupted by the answering cries of Italian nationalists on the upper balcony who shower the stalls area below with patriotic leaflets. In Italian Film in the Light of Neorealism, Millicent Marcus proposes that Visconti used this operatic paradigm throughout Senso, with parallels between the opera's protagonists, Manrico and Leonora, and the film's protagonists, Ussoni and Livia. A staging of act 1, scene 2, of Il trovatore is featured in Bernardo Bertolucci's 1979 film La Luna. Music from the opera was featured on Kijiji in Canada for commercials.

== Historical references ==
While the story and most of the characters are fictitious, it is set towards the end of a real civil war in Aragon. Following the death of King Martin of Aragon in 1410, no fewer than six candidates staked a claim for the throne. A political meeting, the Compromise of Caspe, found in favour of Martin's sororal nephew Ferdinand. Count James II of Urgell, King Martin's brother-in-law and the closest relative through purely patrilineal line of descent, refused to accept the decision of the Compromise, believing (with some justification) that Martin had intended to adopt him as the heir by appointing him Governor-General after the death of his own son Martin the Younger, and rebelled. A third candidate was Frederic, Count of Luna, bastard son of Martin the Younger, whose legitimization had been sought from the Pope unsuccessfully. As part of the compromise for withdrawing his own claim in favour of Ferdinand, Frederic was granted the County of Luna, one of the lesser titles that his father had held.

While neither of the two princes who actually took part in the war appears in the opera – neither is even referred to by name, and only Urgell is referred to by his title – the fortunes of their followers mirror those of their princes. Thus, with his military success, Ferdinand's side has the upper hand in the war and is effectively the Royalist party, with the backing of much of the nobility and the Dowager Queen, and he also has Di Luna as his chief henchman (Luna's own connection to the royal family is not mentioned, being not necessary to the drama): while Urgel, losing the war and on the back foot, is forced to recruit among outlaws and the dispossessed, effectively taking the part of a rebel despite having some legal right to his case. Thus the fact that the forces of Urgel, in the opera as in real life, lose every pitched battle: and on the single occasion that they capture a castle (named in the opera as "Castellor", a fairly generic name for a castle, there being many Castellars in the region), it proves a handicap to them because their only hope in battle lies in speed, mobility, surprise and ambush, all of which are lost when defending a fortress.

Thus it is that the fictitious troubadour Manrico can gain his rags-to-riches background, having risen from the obscurity of a Biscayan gypsy camp to become Urgel's chief general, a knight and a master swordsman in his own right, good enough to defeat Di Luna himself in a personal duel, or win a knightly tournament: only to lose it again on the military battlefield, where the odds are perpetually against him, and he is damned as an outlaw even before the opera begins, for no deed of his own but because his master is the rebel. And yet he gets to be a heroic, popular outlaw, who might just escape with his life in return for a vow of future loyalty, if put on trial in front of the Prince himself: a chance that Luna does not want to risk, given that his rivalry with Manrico is personal as well as political. Hence the challenge to the duel over the personal rivalry, instead of calling the guards and making the arrest political, in act 1: and hence also the decision to execute without trial in act 4 even though Luna knows he is abusing his position. Leonora and Azucena are, of course, as fictitious as Manrico, as is the story's conceit that the former Count of Luna had not one but two sons.

== Recordings ==
First preserved recording of "Di quella pira". Ferruccio Giannini, May 7, 1896

Over the last century there has been an increase in interest and appreciation for Verdi's music. Remarkably, there has been a lot of interest in the excerpt "Miserere" and "Di Quella Pira", and since the dawn of recorded music there have been tens of recordings of these fragments, ranging from vocal interpretations to instrumental duets. For the early American market, Giannini's and Pryor's arrangements may be notable, and for the Russian market Labinskii's recording is considered to be the most mature. Though, for the first half of the 20th century, Caruso's version would be the most acclaimed.

== In popular culture ==
The Anvil Chorus is one of the most-recognized pieces of classical music. It "has transcended the opera itself" and is often played in non-opera concerts. It appears in many cultural references as well.

Restored version of Berliner Gramophone matrix 0572 ("Miserere"). Sung by Ferruccio Giannini and recorded in Oct 7, 1899

A modified sample of an 1899 recording of Ferruccio Giannini's performance of "Miserere" appears on The Caretaker recording Everywhere at the End of Time (Stage 3).
