= Academy of Music (New York City) =

Former opera house

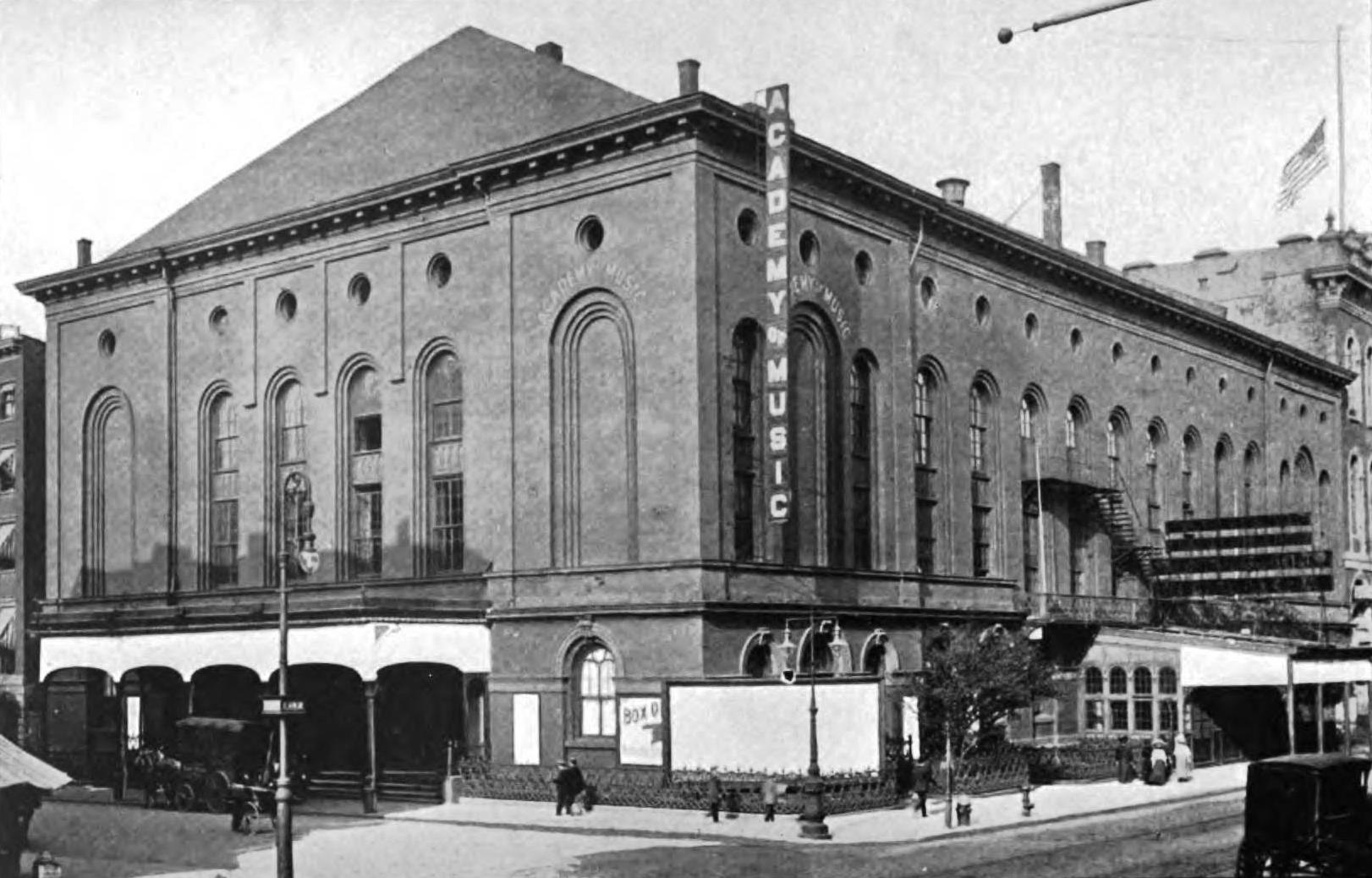
- Academy of Music, New York, c.1909

General information
- Location: Manhattan, New York, 126 East 14th Street
- Coordinates: 40°44′04″N 73°59′19″W
- Opened: 1854
- Demolished: 1926

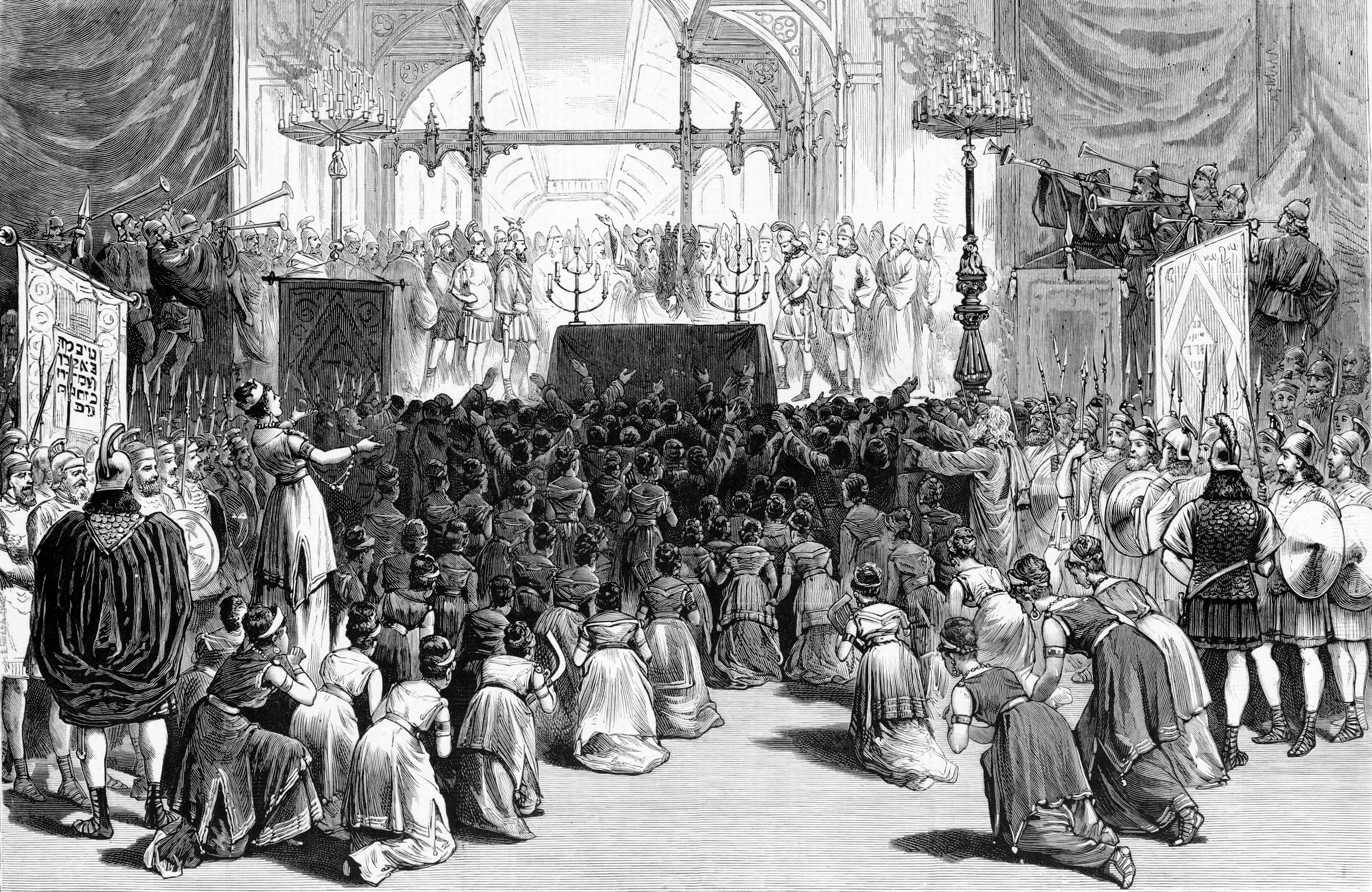
Hanukkah celebration by the Young Men's Hebrew Association at the Academy of Music, December 16, 1880

The Academy of Music was a New York City opera house, located on the northeast corner of East 14th Street and Irving Place in Manhattan. The 4,000-seat hall opened on October 2, 1854. The review in The New York Times declared it to be an acoustical "triumph", but "In every other aspect ... a decided failure," complaining about the architecture, interior design and the closeness of the seating; although a follow-up several days later relented a bit, saying that the theater "looked more cheerful, and in every way more effective" than it had on opening night.

The Academy's opera season became the center of social life for New York's elite, with the oldest and most prominent families owning seats in the theater's boxes. The opera house was destroyed by fire in 1866 and subsequently rebuilt, but it was supplanted as the city's premier opera venue in 1883 by the Metropolitan Opera House at 1411 Broadway between 39th and 40th Streets – created by the nouveaux riches who had been frozen out of the Academy – and ceased presenting opera in 1886, turning instead to vaudeville. It was demolished in 1926 to make way for the Consolidated Edison Building.

== Opera house ==
The Academy of Music has been described as "the first successful dedicated opera house in the United States", but it was not the first building in New York designed specifically for opera. That honor goes to the Italian Opera House built in 1833 by Lorenzo Da Ponte as a home for his new New York Opera Company, which lasted only two seasons before the company was disbanded and the theatre sold. Over a decade later, in 1847, the Isaiah Rogers-designed Astor Opera House opened on Astor Place, only to close several years later after a riot provoked by competing performances of Macbeth by English actor William Macready at the Opera House and American Edwin Forrest at the nearby Broadway Theatre. By May 1853, the interior had been dismantled and the furnishings sold off, with the shell of the building sold to the Mercantile Library Association.

It was the demise of the Astor Opera House that spurred New York's elite to build a new opera house in what was then the more genteel neighborhood of Union Square, led by Moses H. Grinnell, who formed a corporation in 1852 to fund the construction of the building, selling shares at $1,000 ($38,700 in 2025 dollars) each to raise $200,000 ($7,740,000 in 2025 dollars). When finished, the building, which was designed by Alexander Saeltzer – who was designing the Astor Library at about the same time – was the world's largest opera venue at the time, with seats for four thousand arranged on five levels (orchestra, parquette, balcony and first, second and third tiers) and an interior height from floor to dome of 80 feet (24 m). It had a plush interior, and private boxes in the orchestra, but, perhaps due to newspaper editorials questioning the project's republican values, was consciously somewhat less "aristocratized" than the Astor Opera House had been – there, general admissions were relegated to the benches of a "cockloft" reachable only by a narrow stairway, and otherwise isolated from the gentry below, while in the new theatre many of the regular seats were relatively inexpensive. The stage's proscenium opening was 48 feet (15 m) wide, with 35 feet (11 m) between side-wings, and a depth of 70 feet (21 m) from the footlights to the back wall. The height of the proscenium opening was 30 feet (9.1 m).

Its first opera season was from October through December 1854. The Max Maretzek Italian Opera Company was engaged by US actor James Henry Hackett. The company performed Bellini's Norma for the inauguration of the theatre with Giulia Grisi in the title role and Giuseppe Mario as Pollione headlining the performance and Max Maretzek conducting. The first season's repertoire was ambitious, and included Semiramide and The Barber of Seville by Rossini; Norma and La sonnambula by Bellini; and Don Pasquale, Lucrezia Borgia, La favorita and Lucia di Lammermoor by Donizetti. Maretzek's company performed an annual season at the Academy through 1878. His company was not the only group active at the opera house during this time. Musicologist George Whitney Martin writes:

New York's Academy of Music, from 1854 to 1883 the city's leading house for opera, did not offer a secure base to any opera company. And why? Because it was primarily a real estate venture run by a board of investors seeking the highest rent possible."

Maurice Strakosch managed his own opera company in New York from 1856 until February 1857, when he merged it with that of Bernard Ullman. The Ullman and Strakosch Opera Company produced operas at the Academy of Music and toured the East Coast. Its last season was a "near-disaster", and it closed down in 1860.

Other opera companies active at the Academy, including Jaime Nunó's Havana Italian Opera Troupe and the Max Strakosch Italian Opera Company, the latter of which began performing at the Academy in 1860, only to merge with Maretzek's company in 1868. The Academy hosted several American premieres, including Rigoletto (1855), Il trovatore (1855), La traviata (1856), Roméo et Juliette (1867), Aida (1873), Lohengrin (1874), Die Walküre (1877) and Carmen (1878).

The Academy's opera season became the center of social life for New York's wealthy gentry, but from its inception, the Academy of Music not only presented opera, but also served as a theater, and a meeting and exposition hall for a wide variety of functions, including political rallies, charity balls and science and industry fairs, among other events. In 1860, it was the site of a reception for Edward VII, the Prince of Wales. After the Civil War, an organization called the Cercle Français de l'Harmonie began using the Academy as a venue for masked balls, also called "French balls", in which the nouveau riche men of New York society would rub elbows – and other body parts – with semi-dressed prostitutes and courtesans, with little regard for public decorum or modesty. These balls were covered by the press, which did little to dim the enthusiasm or ribald behavior of the participants. One reporter wrote that women were thrown in the air and then sexually assaulted "amid the jeers and laughter of the other drunken wretches on the floor ... [with] not a whisper of shame in the crowd". These spectacles grew in size over the following decades: in 1876, one such ball was attended by over 4,000 people. Feminist editor Victoria Woodhull condemned the sexual hypocrisy of the French balls in 1873 in Woodhull and Clafliin's Weekly, complaining that the Academy of Music was being used "for the purpose of debauching debauched women; and the trustees of the Academy know this".

Still, it was the opera season that made the Academy the mainstay of social life for New York's "uppertens", and the oldest and most prominent families owned seats in the theater's boxes. This emblem of social prominence was passed down from generation to generation. The inability of New York's wealthy industrial and mercantile families, including the Vanderbilts, Goulds and Morgans, to gain access to this closed society inspired the creation of the new Metropolitan Opera Association in 1880. The trustees of the Academy belatedly attempted to head off the competition by offering to add 26 new boxes to the 18 the Academy already had, to accommodate the Vanderbilts, Morgans, and Rockefellers who were behind the planned new venue, but it was too late to fend them off. The Metropolitan's new opera house at Broadway and 39th Street, twice the size of the Academy, opened in 1883. It contained three tiers of elegant boxes to display the wealth of the city's new economic leaders. The new opera house was an instant success with New York society and music lovers alike, and the Academy of Music's opera season was canceled in 1886.

In 1888, the Academy began to offer vaudeville. The Drury Lane import The White Heather had a successful 148-performance run for the 1897–98 season. Between 1895 and 1899, Rev. Thomas Dixon Jr., delivered sermons there. From January 28 to March 1901, a revival of Clyde Fitch's play Barbara Frietchie appeared there.

The venue was rented by labor organizations in the early 1900s and used to stage rallies. In 1910 it was converted into a moving picture house, with a reported rental of $90,000 per year. In 1926, it was demolished, along with its neighbor Tammany Hall, for the construction of the Consolidated Edison Building.

== Movie theater ==
On the south side of 14th Street across from the site of the opera house, a movie theatre opened in 1927 which took the name the Academy of Music. It was built as a 3,000-seat deluxe movie palace by movie mogul William Fox, and was designed by Thomas W. Lamb. It served as a venue for rock concerts in the 1960s and early 1970s, with its name being changed to "The Palladium" by promoter Ron Delsener in September 1976. In 1985, it was converted into the Palladium nightclub, designed by Arata Isozaki. The theater was bought and demolished by New York University, and replaced by the present Palladium Residence Hall, which opened in 2001.

== In literature and popular culture ==
The second paragraph of Edith Wharton's The Age of Innocence reads: "On a January evening of the early seventies, Christine Nilsson was singing in Faust at the Academy of Music in New York. Though there was already talk of the erection 'above the forties' of a new Opera House which would compete in costliness and splendour with those of the great European capitals, the world of fashion was still content to reassemble every winter in the shabby red and gold boxes of the sociable old Academy. Conservatives cherished it for being small and inconvenient, and thus keeping out the 'new people' whom New York was beginning to dread and yet be drawn to; and the sentimental clung to it for its historic associations, and the musical for its excellent acoustics, always so problematic a quality in halls built for the hearing of music." The Academy and so-called "opera war" of the early 1880s are a significant part of the plot in season two of the HBO series The Gilded Age.
