= NoHo, Manhattan =

Neighborhood of New York City

Coordinates: 40°43′40″N 73°59′35″W

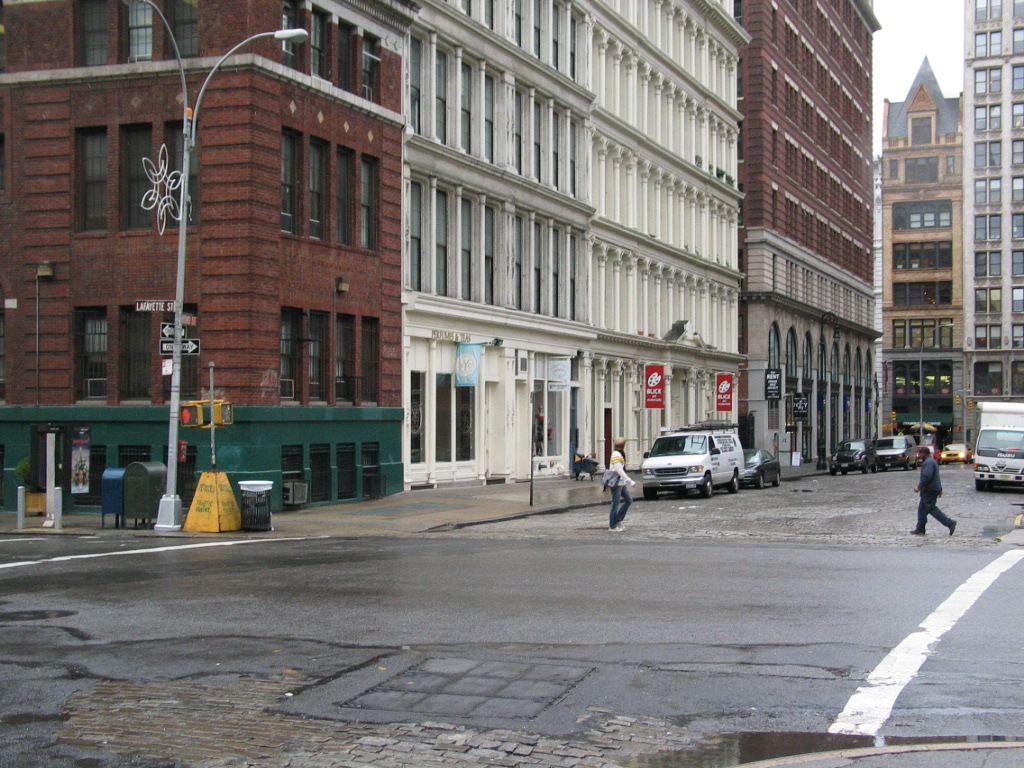
Looking westward along Bond Street in NoHo

Location in New York City

NoHo, short for "North of Houston Street" (as contrasted with SoHo), is a primarily residential neighborhood in Lower Manhattan, New York City. It is bounded by Mercer Street to the west, the Bowery to the east, 9th Street to the north, and Houston Street to the south.

The New York City Landmarks Preservation Commission has declared most of the 125-building area a historic district, divided into the NoHo Historic District and the NoHo East Historic District, created in 2003.

== History ==
In 1748, Jacob Sperry, a physician from Switzerland, created the city's first botanical garden near the current intersection of Lafayette Street and Astor Place. At the time, it was located about 1 mile (1.6 km) north of the developed portion of the city and served as a vacation stop for people from present-day downtown. By 1804, John Jacob Astor bought the site from Sperry and leased it to Joseph Delacroix. Delacroix built a country resort named Vauxhall Gardens on the site; the gardens had previously been located further downtown, in Tribeca.

NoHo soon became an enclave for well-to-do families. Because of rapid development on Bond, Bleecker, and Great Jones Streets, it was not affordable to build houses on these streets. These streets were among the city's most elite at the time, and contained such personalities as "aristocratic" mayor Philip Hone. Therefore, in 1826, after Delacroix's lease expired, Astor carved out an upper-class neighborhood from the site with Lafayette Street bisecting eastern gardens from western homes. The street was christened by the Marquis de Lafayette in July 1825.

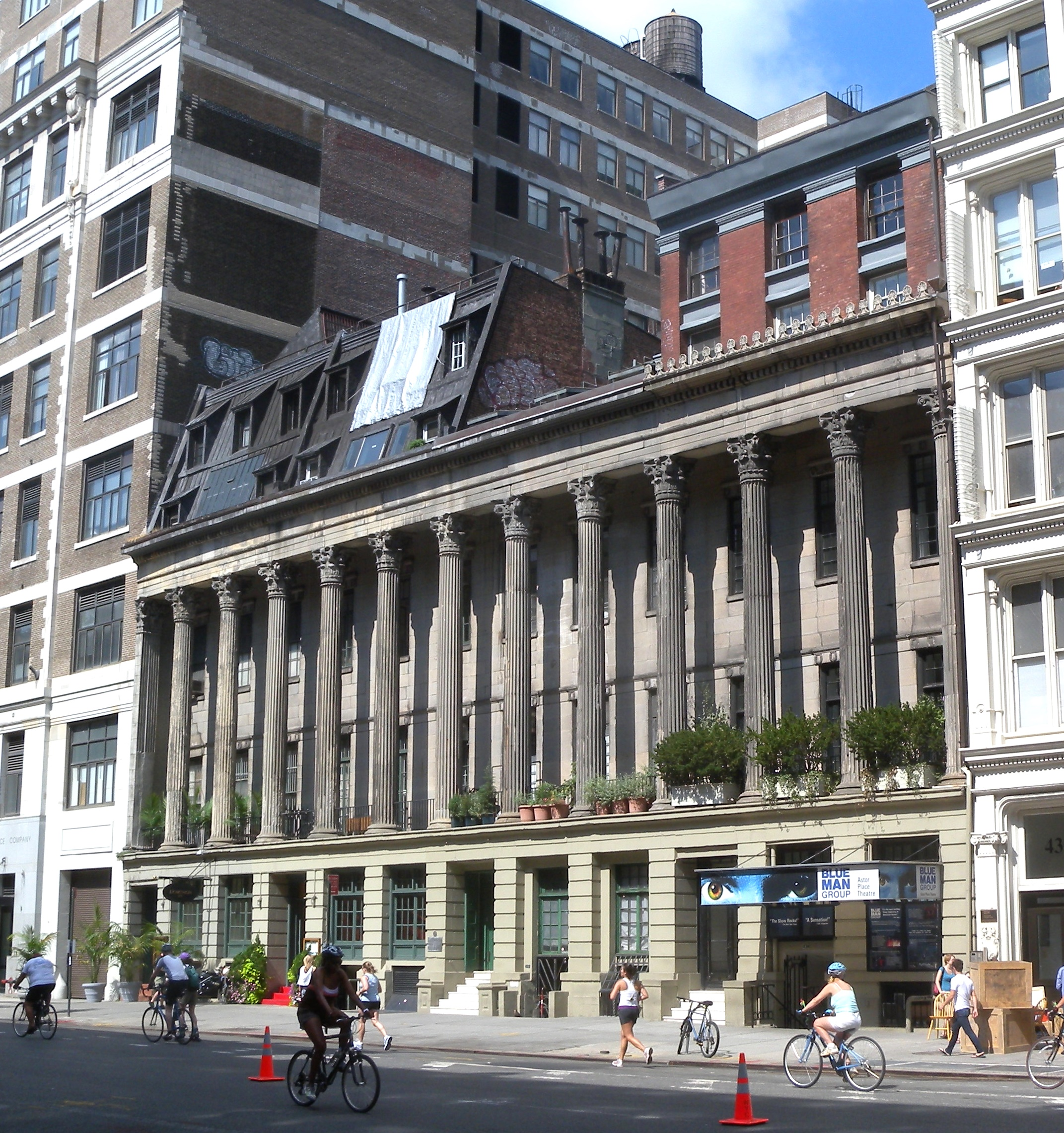
Colonnade Row

Wealthy New Yorkers, including Astor and other members of the family, built mansions along this central thoroughfare. Astor built the Astor Library Building in the eastern portion of the neighborhood as a donation to the city. Alexander Jackson Davis designed eye-catching row houses called LaGrange Terrace (now Colonnade Row) for speculative builder Seth Geer. Geer built the houses for the development in 1833. The area became a fashionable, upper-class residential district, and when Lafayette Street was opened in the 1820s, it quickly became one of the most fashionable streets in New York. This location made the Gardens accessible to residents of nearby Broadway and the Bowery. The houses once contained such notable residents as the Astor family and the Vanderbilt family, in addition to authors Washington Irving, Charles Dickens, and William Makepeace Thackeray. U.S. President John Tyler was married in these houses.

In the summer of 1838, the garden's owners opened a saloon for the staging of vaudeville comic operas. Later theatre managers expanded offerings to appeal to a wider range of patrons. By 1850, the rowdier crowds of the Bowery had mostly scared off the upper classes, and fewer people came to the Vauxhall Gardens. The theater buildings were demolished in 1855, and the gardens closed in 1859.

Even so, wealthy New Yorkers lived here through the end of the 19th century. Editor and poet William Cullen Bryant and inventor and entrepreneur Isaac Singer lived in the neighborhood in the 1880s. By the 20th century, warehouses and manufacturing firms moved in. Consequently the elite moved to places such as Murray Hill, and the area fell into disrepair. The neighborhood became mainly a manufacturing district by the 1880s, especially around the relatively wide Bond Street. Terra cotta and brick "loft" buildings were among the new buildings being constructed in this time, and construction of such buildings continued into the 1890s, in the Greek Revival architectural style in homage to the mansions that formerly occupied the area. The demolition of upper-class buildings continued, and by 1902, the southernmost five mansions on Colonnade Row were demolished for the Wanamaker's Department Store annex. Most of the mansions on Bond Street, though, lasted through the 1930s.

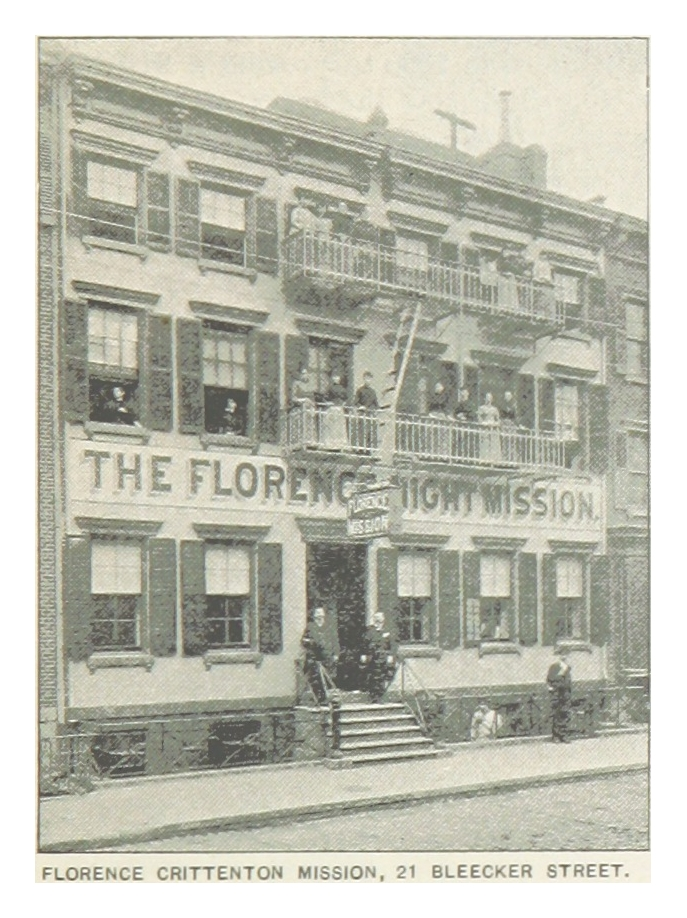
National Florence Crittenton Mission, 21 Bleecker Street, 1893

Not all of NoHo was built for and by the rich and (now) famous. Two Federal architecture-style row houses on the easternmost block of Bleecker Street were once the home of the National Florence Crittenton Mission, providing a home for "fallen women". 21 Bleecker Street's entrance now bears the lettering "Florence Night Mission", described by The New York Times in 1883 as "a row of houses of the lowest character". The National Florence Crittenton Mission was an organization established in 1883 by philanthropist Charles N. Crittenton. It attempted to reform prostitutes and unwed pregnant women through the creation of establishments where they were to live and learn skills.

That same block of Bleecker Street, between Lafayette and Bowery Streets in NoHo, is also home to both the Margaret Sanger Health Center, headquarters of Planned Parenthood, and the Catholic Sheen Center, immediately adjacent to it. Bleecker Street was the home of Sanger's original Birth Control Clinical Research Bureau, operated from another building from 1930 to 1973. Bleecker Street now features Margaret Sanger Square, at the intersection with Mott Street.

After World War II, manufacturing companies moved out of New York City and to the suburbs. By the 1950s, these spaces were rented to artists and small theatre companies. The artists had to go through extensive litigation to live and work in these spaces. By 1960, there were more artists than businesses in these loft spaces. Among the famous artists at the time were Robert Mapplethorpe, who bought a loft in NoHo; Chuck Close, who lived next to him; and street artists Jean-Michel Basquiat and Andy Warhol. The neighborhood was revitalized in the late 1960s and 1970s. As artists began to rent lofts in the neighborhood in the 1970s and 1980s, the name NoHo came into use to distinguish it from nearby SoHo. Previously, the area now comprising NoHo, SoHo, and eastern Tribeca was known as the warehouse district. The art movement of the 1970s and the preservation movements of the 1990s and 2000s also helped to revitalize the area.

== Preservation ==
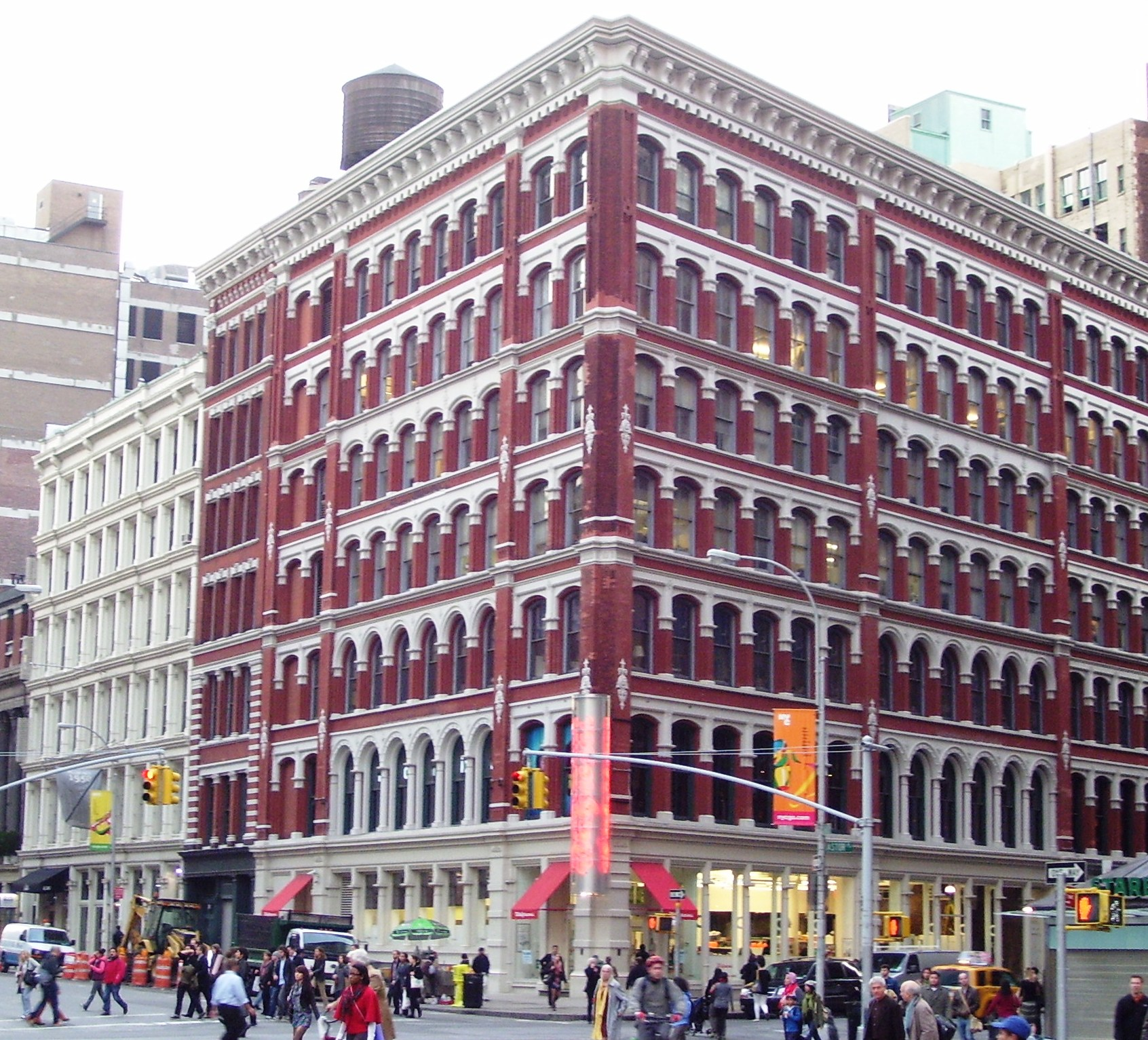
The Astor Place Building at 444 Lafayette Street was built in 1876.

The area was declared an official city historic district by the New York City Landmarks Preservation Commission in 1999. From its designation report:

The NoHo Historic District, which comprises approximately 125 buildings, represents the period of New York City's commercial history from the early 1850s to the 1910s, when this section prospered as one of its major retail and wholesale dry goods centers. Acclaimed architects were commissioned to design ornate store and loft buildings in popular architectural styles, providing a rich fabric against which shoppers promenaded, looked at display windows, and bought goods, and merchants sold products. The district also contains early-nineteenth century houses, nineteenth- and twentieth-century institutional buildings, turn-of-the-century office buildings, as well as modest twentieth-century commercial structures, all of which testify to each successive phase in the development of the historic district. Today, the effect is of powerful and unifying streetscapes of marble, cast iron, limestone, brick, and terracotta facades.

The NoHo Historic District was expanded in 2008. Additionally, another district in the neighborhood, the NoHo East Historic District, was created in 2003. The designations followed considerable effort by and strong support from numerous local community and preservation groups, including the Greenwich Village Society for Historic Preservation and Historic Districts Council, and together, they form a contiguous area of landmarked buildings over 21 city blocks. The 2008 extension is bounded on the west by Lafayette Street, on the east by the Bowery, on the north by East Fourth Street and on the south by Bond Street. It includes 56 buildings and a mid-block parking lot to the south and east of the existing Noho Historic District. It does not include 30 Great Jones Street, a historic building that was partially demolished in early 2008.

Most of the buildings in the extension were built between the 1860s and the early 1900s, when the area had become one of the city's major commercial and manufacturing districts. By the late 1800s, larger commercial lofts in the Greek Revival style became the dominant building type.

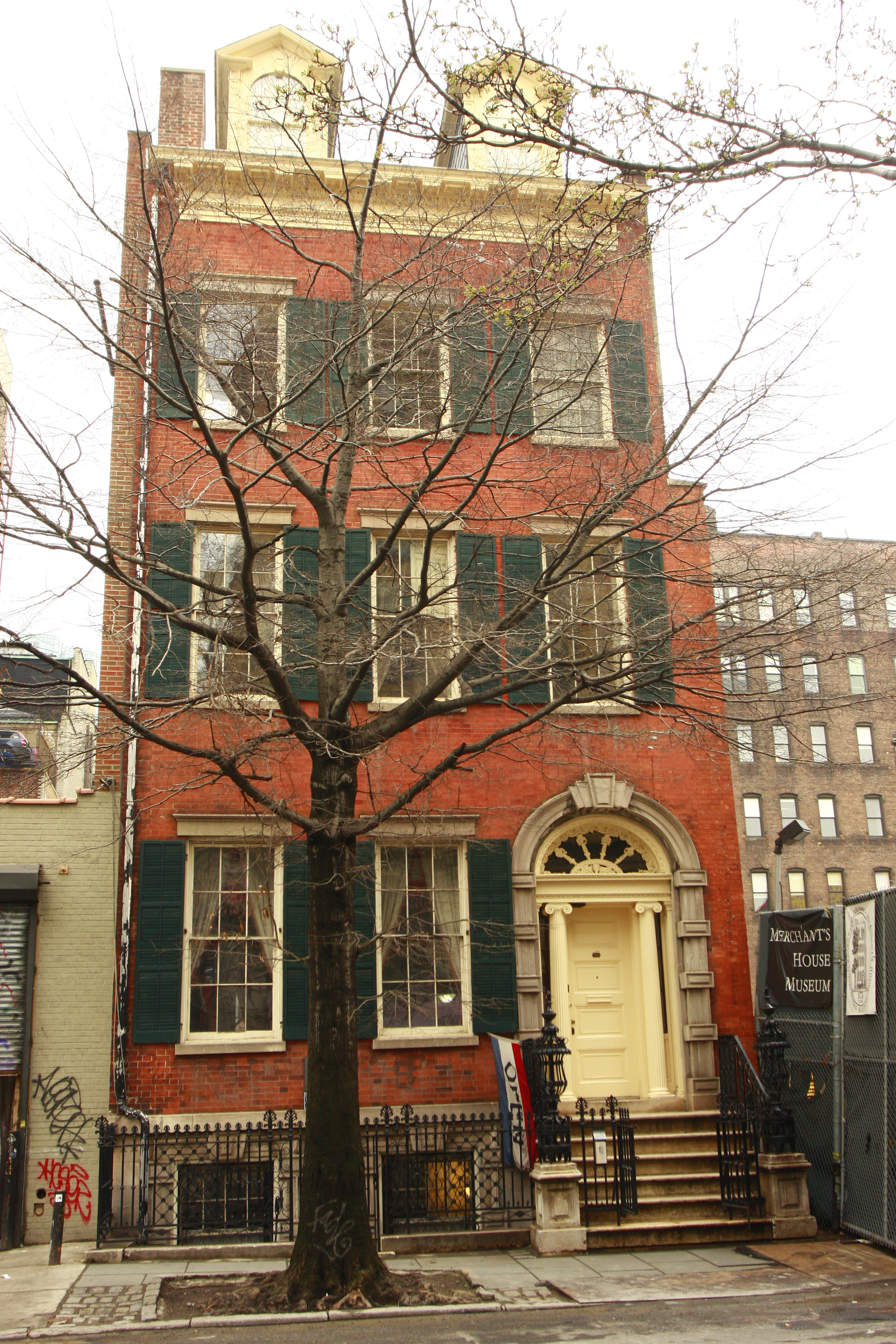
Merchant's House Museum

The Merchant's House Museum, at 29 East Fourth Street, is an individual historic building located just outside the eastern boundary of the Historic District. It is also a National Historic Landmark and is listed on the National Register of Historic Places. Both the inside and outside of this 1832 house have been restored to the mid-19th century style in which merchant Seabury Tredwell and his family lived. Despite the fragility of the structure, in April 2014 the New York City Landmarks Preservation Commission approved construction of an eight-story hotel immediately next door. Preservationists including City Councilwoman Rosie Mendez, the Greenwich Village Society for Historic Preservation, the Historic Districts Council and the Museum itself fought the proposed hotel for years due to concern for the intact survival of the Merchant's House. The LPC approved it over the objections of engineers and architects.

== Gentrification ==
In the 2000s and 2010s, NoHo and its southern neighbor, SoHo, experienced rapid gentrification. Since NoHo is primarily made up of loft apartments, this in turn makes it one of the most expensive and desirable neighborhoods in Manhattan. Its small size and central location also contributes to a high demand, again keeping prices high. In 2014, a one-bedroom loft could rent at an average monthly rate of US$4,000.

== Notable places ==
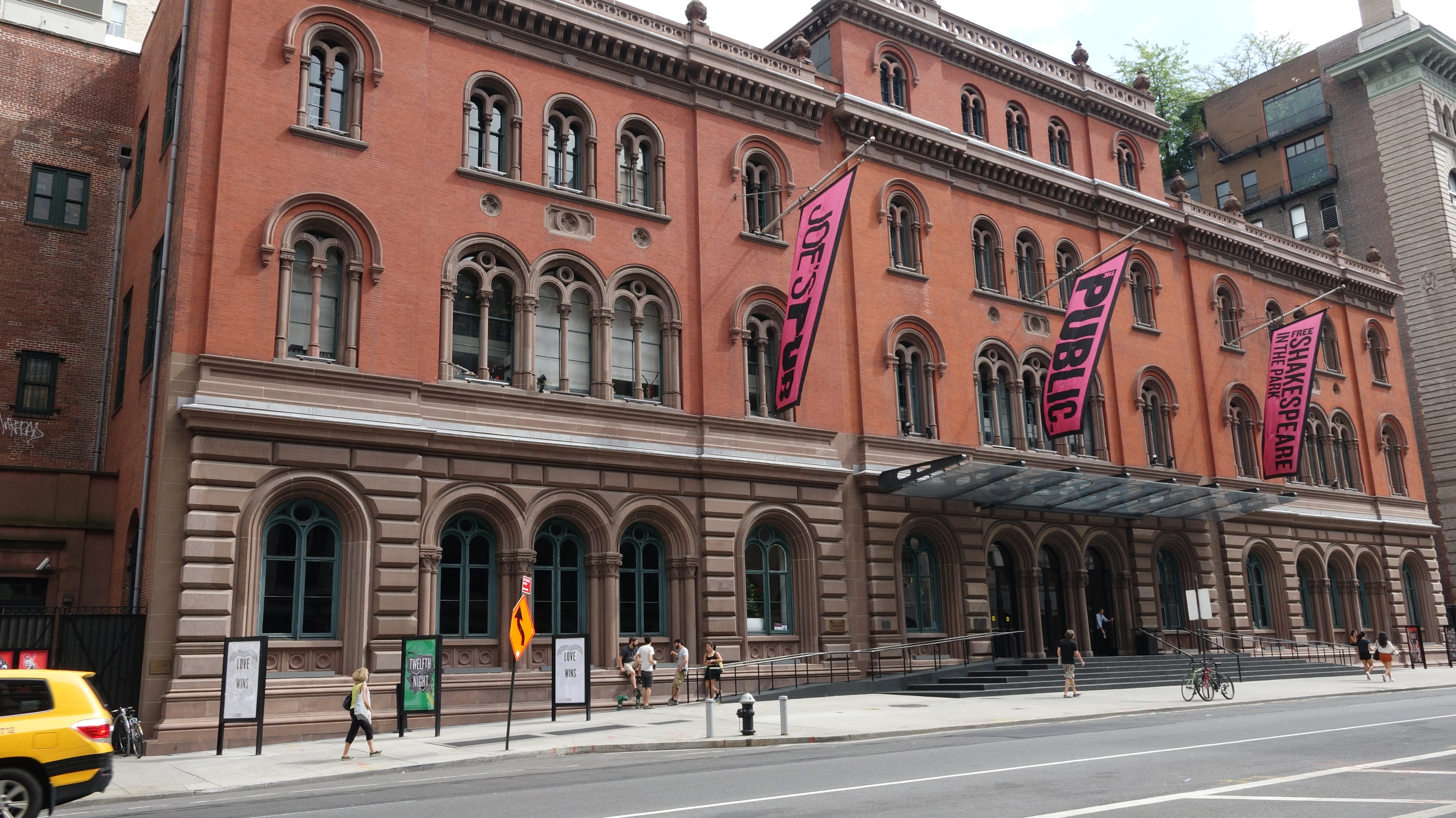
The Public Theater is housed in the Astor Library Building.

Some individual landmarks in the NoHo Historic District include the Bouwerie Lane Theater, the Bayard-Condict Building, the De Vinne Press Building. Two New York City Subway stations, Astor Place and Bleecker Street, are also landmarked. The only survivor of the 19th-century upper-class era is half of the original Colonnade Row, which is also landmarked. The Gene Frankel Theater, established in 1949, is located in the landmarked 24 Bond Street building, built in 1893. Across from Colonnade Row is the Astor Library Building, housing The Public Theater.

The easternmost block of Bleecker Street houses the last remaining Federal architecture-style row houses, including two that were once the home of the Florence Night Mission, which provided a home for "fallen women". (21 Bleecker Street's entrance now bears the lettering in the flooring.) The block also houses the Planned Parenthood headquarters at the Margaret Sanger Square, adjacent to a Catholic event center.

== Notable residents ==
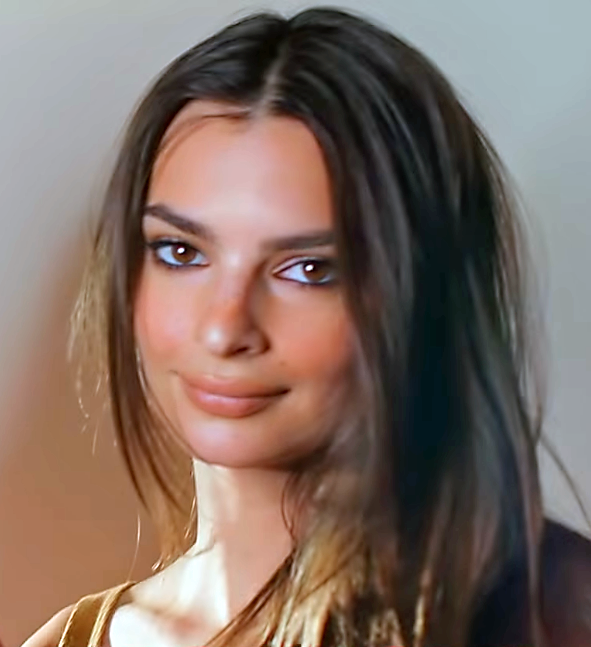
Emily Ratajkowski

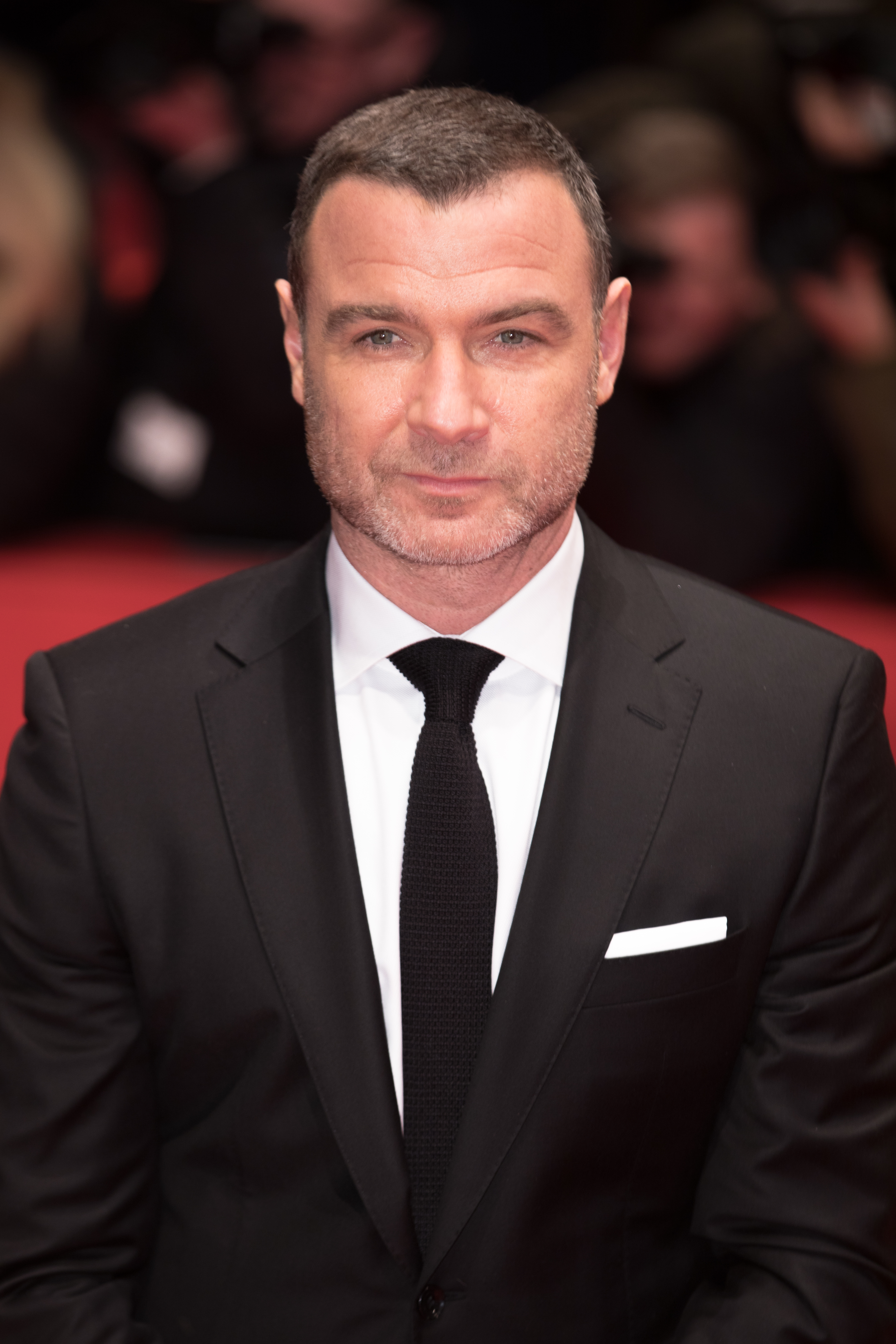
Liev Schreiber

- Jean-Michel Basquiat (1960–1988), artist
- Jessica Chastain (born 1977), actress and producer
- Chuck Close (1940–2021), painter, artist and photographer
- Sheryl Crow (born 1962), musician and actress
- Peter Cunningham, photographer, and Ara Fitzgerald
- Hanna Eshel (1926–2023), sculptor
- Robert Frank (1924–2019), married to June Leaf (at 7 Bleecker Street)
- Gigi Hadid (born 1995), model
- Glen Hansard lived at 21 Bleecker Street
- Jonah Hill (born 1983), actor, director, producer, screenwriter, and comedian.
- Lauren Hutton (born 1943), model and actress
- Zach Iscol (born 1978), US Marine Corps veteran, entrepreneur, candidate in the 2021 New York City Comptroller election
- June Leaf (1929–2024), married to Robert Frank (at 7 Bleecker Street)
- Dua Lipa (born 1995), singer and songwriter (at 21 Bleecker Street, 2019–2020)
- Robert Mapplethorpe (1946–1989), photographer
- Miles McMillan (born 1989), model, actor, and painter
- Cynthia Nixon (born 1966), actress and activist
- Glenn O'Brien (1947–2017), writer who focused largely on the subjects of art, music, and fashion
- Zachary Quinto (born 1977), actor and film producer
- Emily Ratajkowski (born 1991), model and actress
- Robert Rauschenberg (1925–2008), painter and graphic artist
- Keith Richards (born 1943), musician, singer, and songwriter
- Suze Rotolo (1943–2011), artist
- Liev Schreiber (born 1967), actor, director, screenwriter, and producer
- Stéphane Sednaoui (born 1963), director, photographer, film producer, and actor
- Alexander Soros (born 1985), philanthropist, lived near Astor Place
- Britney Spears (born 1981), singer, songwriter, dancer, and actress
- Frank Stella (born 1936), painter, sculptor, and printmaker
- Kristen Stewart (born 1990), actress and filmmaker
- Jean-Claude van Itallie (1936–2021), playwright, performer, and theatre workshop teacher, who lived at 21 Bleecker Street
- Gernot Wagner (born 1980), climate economist who lived at 21 Bleecker Street
- Cameron Winklevoss (born 1981), Olympic rower, cryptocurrency investor, and entrepreneur

== Gallery ==
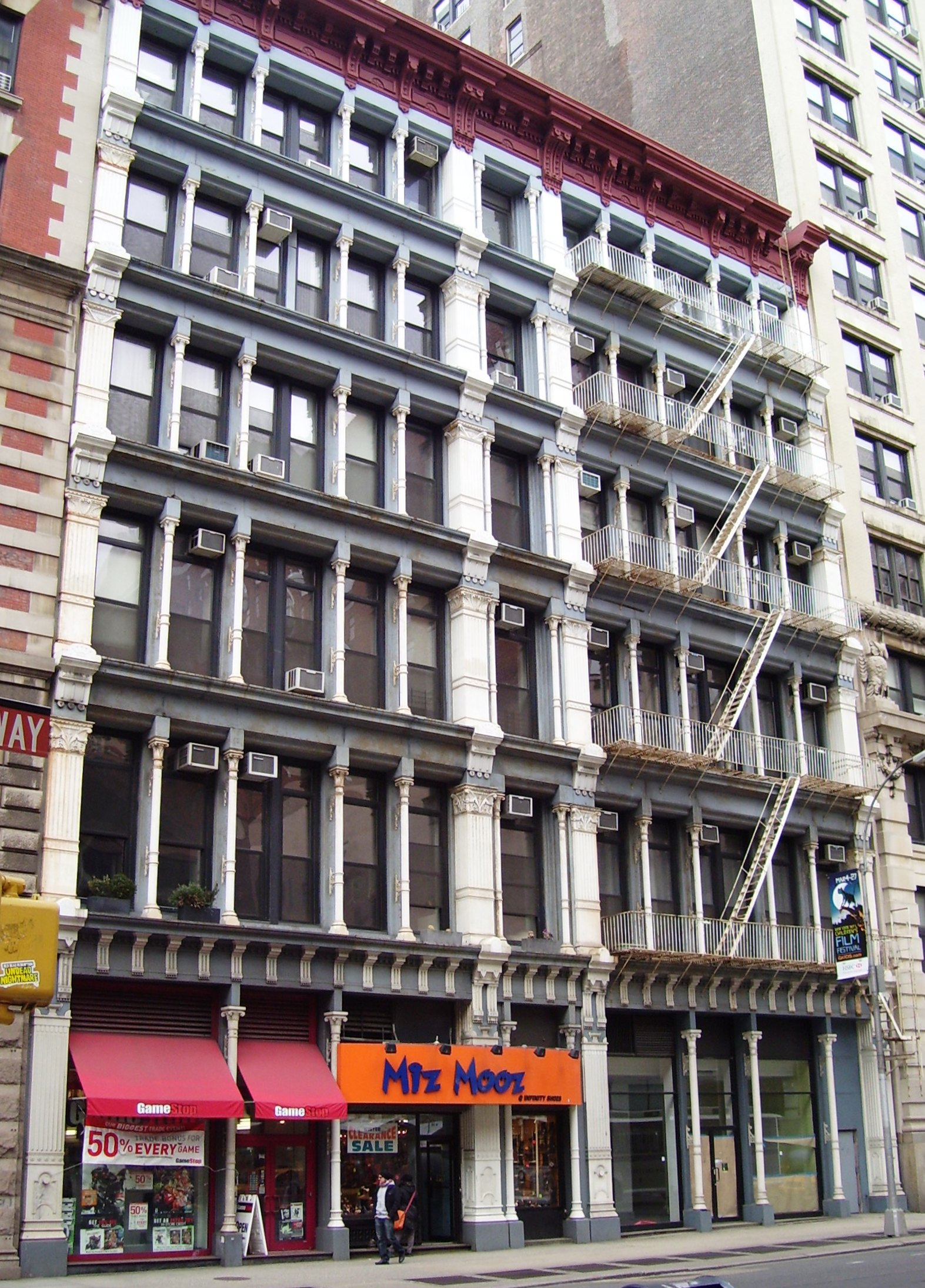
687–691 Broadway/250–254 Mercer Street was designed by J. A. Wood and built from 1885 to 1888

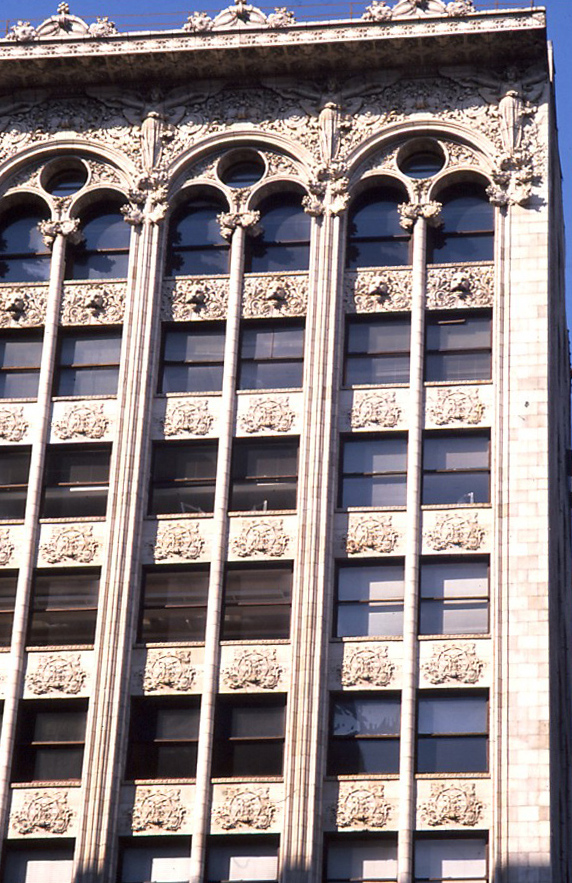
Facade of Louis Sullivan's Bayard–Condict Building (built 1897–99) at 65 Bleecker Street between Broadway and Lafayette Street

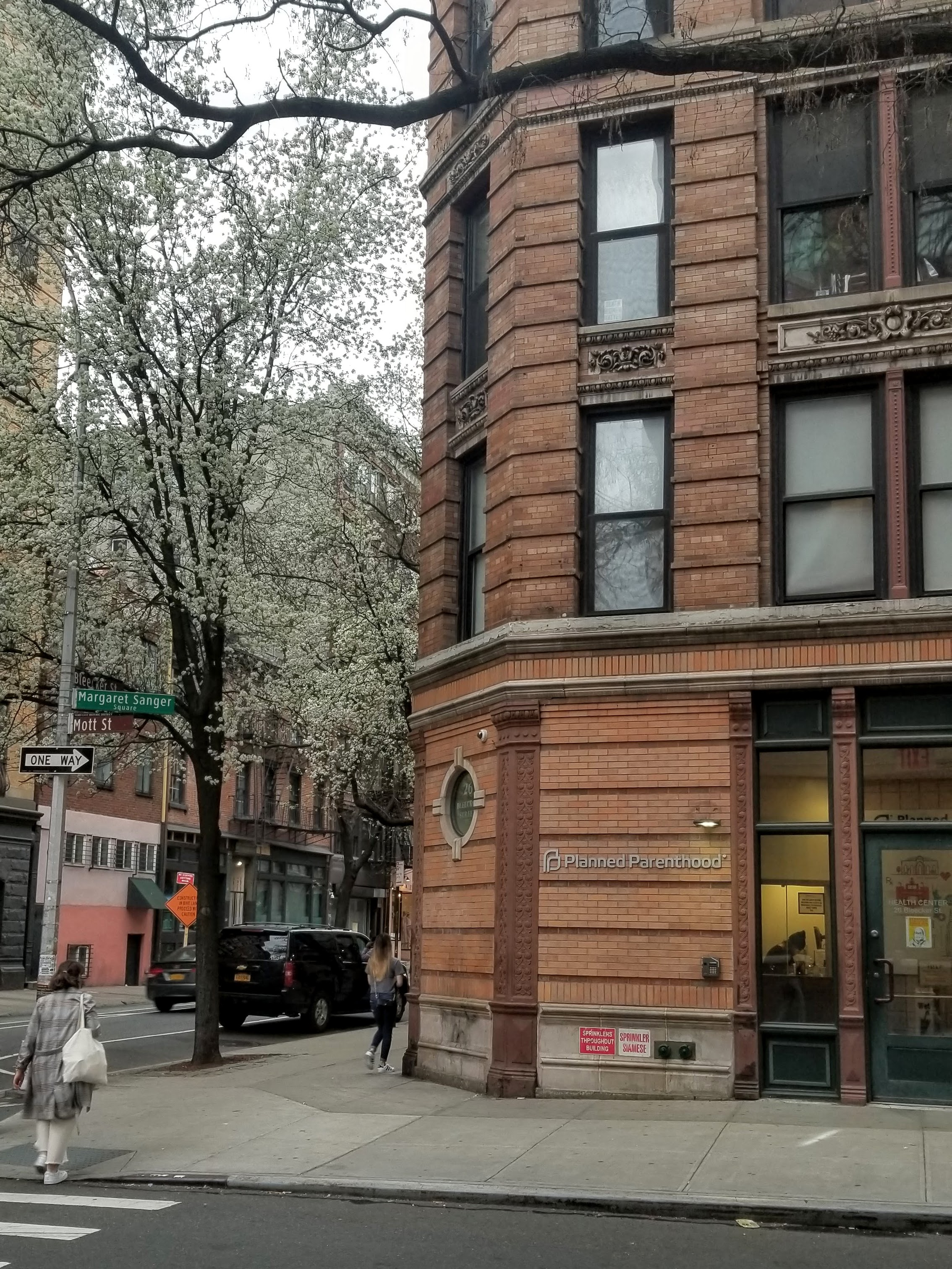
Planned Parenthood headquarters on Bleecker Street's Margaret Sanger Square

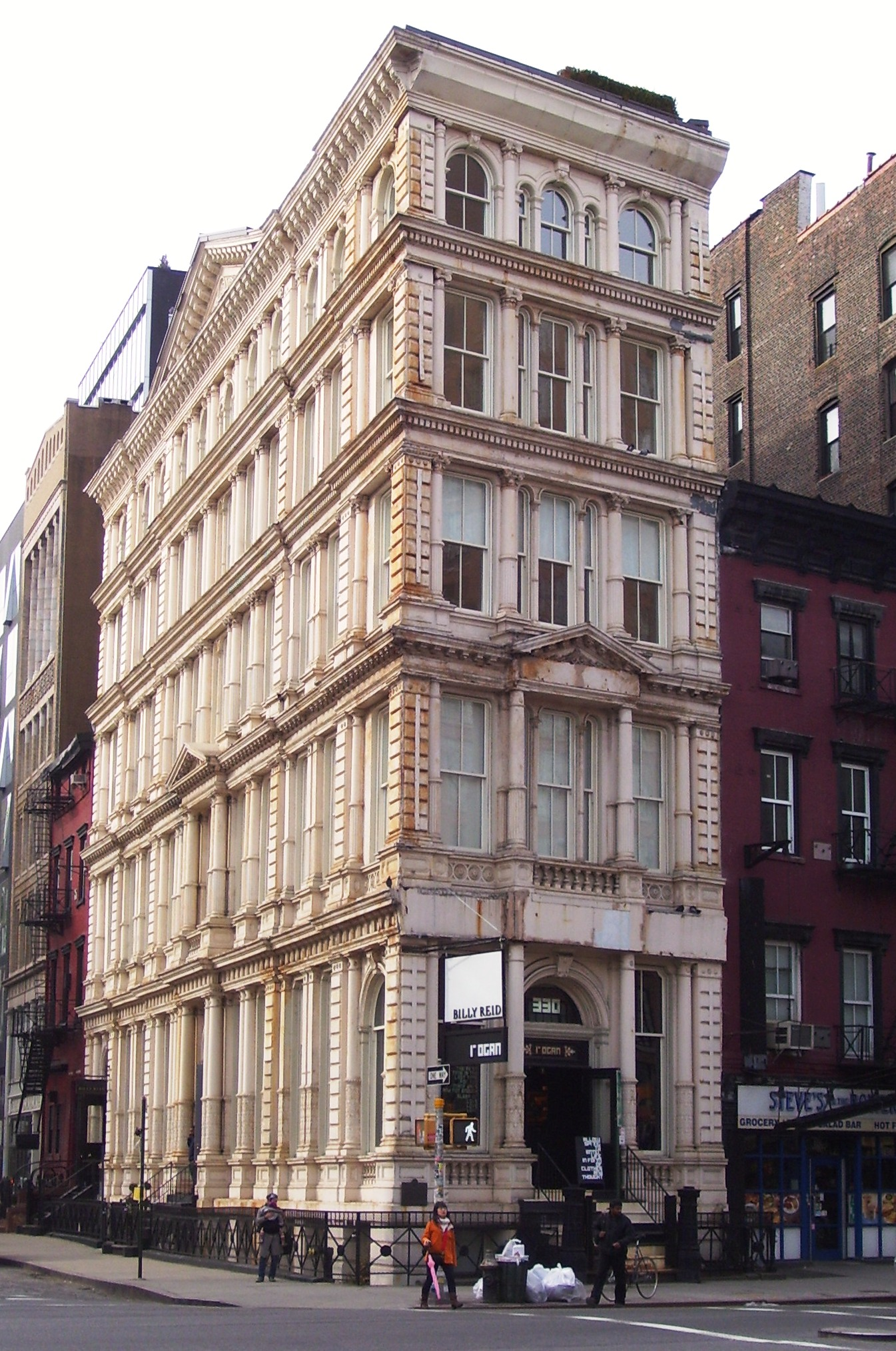
The Bouwerie Lane Theatre's Bowery facade
