= Bond Street (Manhattan) =

Street in Manhattan, New York

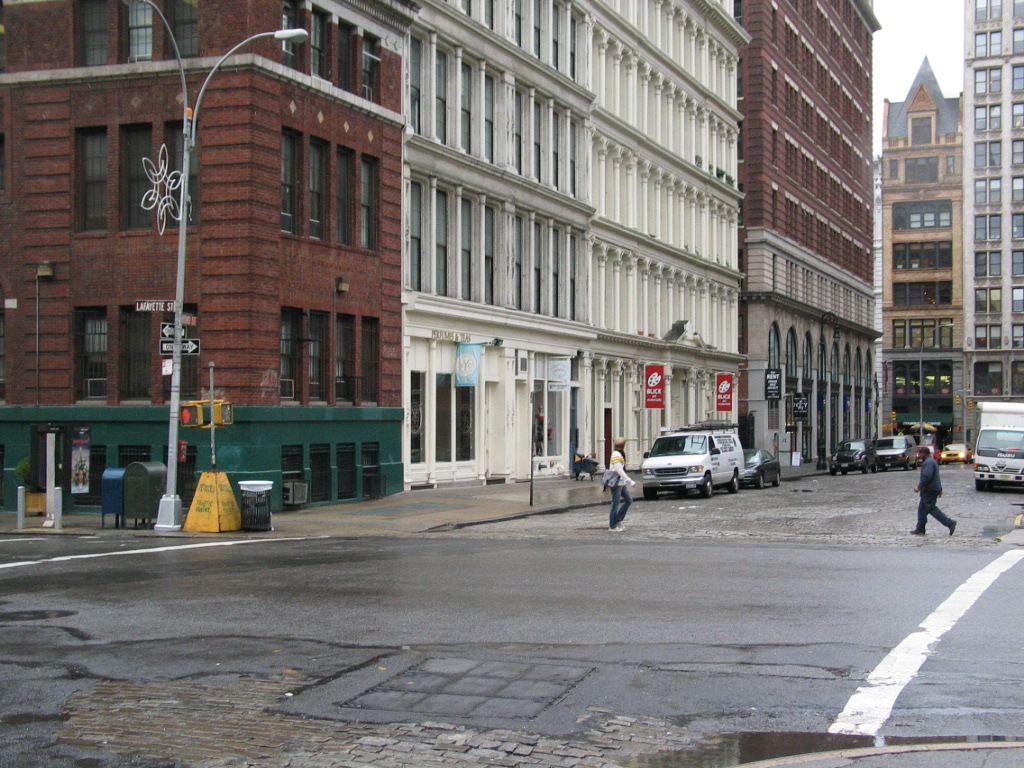
Bond Street in Lower Manhattan

Bond Street is an east–west street running between Broadway and Bowery, in the NoHo neighborhood of Lower Manhattan in New York City.

== History ==
The actual namesake of the street is undetermined. It may have been named for city surveyor William Bond, or for a mention in an 1817 guidebook referring to Broadway as "The Bond Street of New York".

== Notable sites ==
At 24 Bond Street is the Gene Frankel Theater, an Off-Broadway venue founded by Gene Frankel in 1949. Dozens of small, golden dancing figures are installed along the iron and brick facade of the building; designed by Bruce Williams, they are known as the Golden Dancers or Dreams of Hyperion. The building is included in the NoHo Historic District Extension.

24 Bond Street was the location of Beatrice and Sam Rivers' studio RivBea and of Robert Mapplethorpe's first studio. Mile End Sandwich, a spin-off restaurant of Mile End Delicatessen, the Jewish deli in Brooklyn, is located on Bond Street between Bowery and Lafayette Street. The Robbins & Appleton Building is located at the western end of the street, at 1–5 Bond Street, while the Bond Street Savings Bank is at the eastern end at 54 Bond Street. More recently, Bond Street became the location of stores for Billy Reid and Drake's OVO Clothing clothing brand.

Another notable building on this street is 40 Bond Street. This apartment and loft mix-use building was designed by Herzog & de Meuron and completed in 2007. The structure has five townhouses at street level with eight floors built on top of these in apartment style. Its facade is of green tinted glass panels that support the building from the outside, reducing the need for internal columns. On the lower end, at the ground level, are 3D grids inspired from the graffiti patterns seen often on the streets of New York City designed in collaboration with Craig Kauffman.
