= Colonnade Row =

Houses in Manhattan, New York

- LaGrange Terrace
- U.S. National Register of Historic Places
- New York State Register of Historic Places
- New York City Landmark
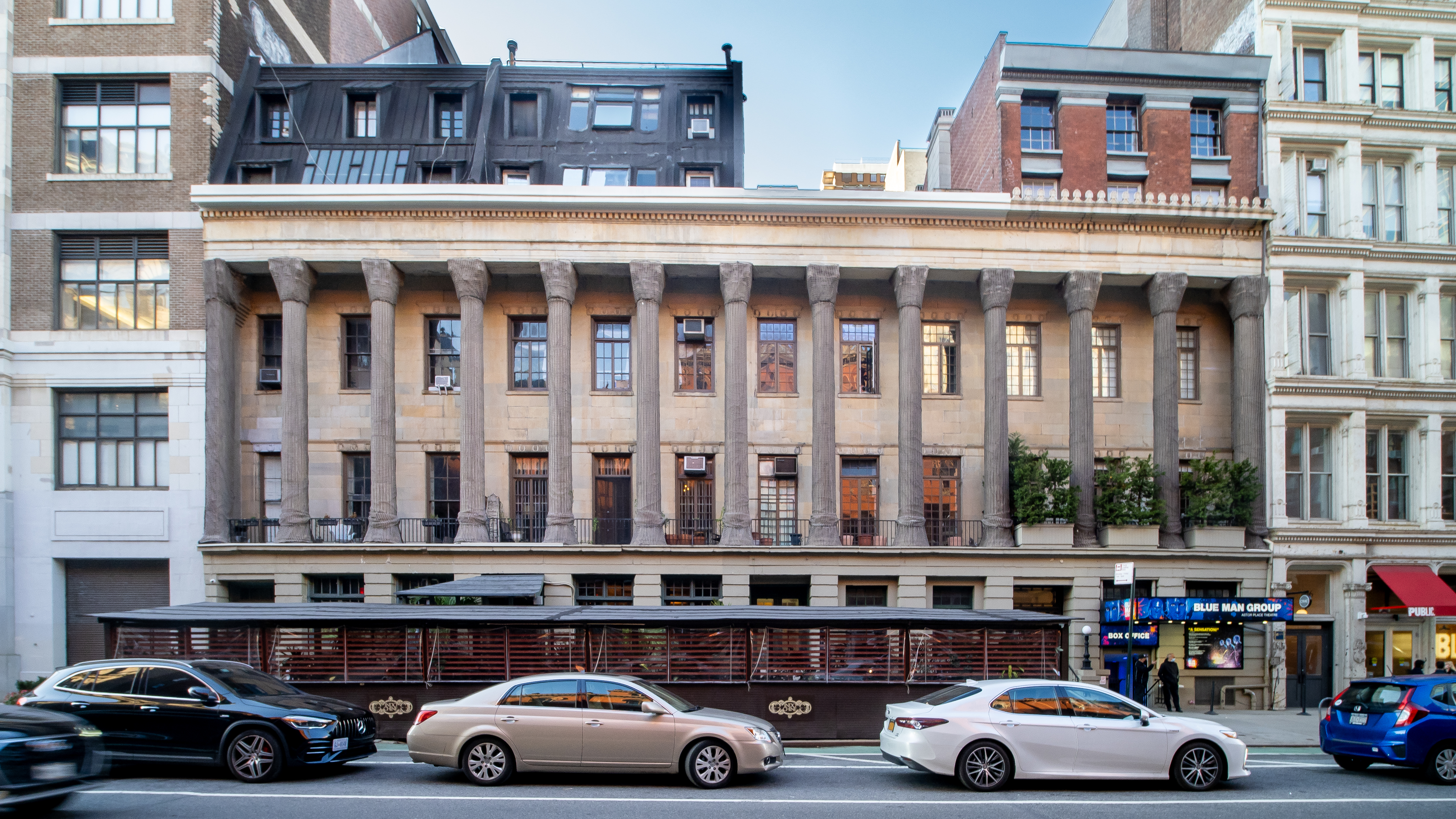

- Location within Manhattan Location within New York City Location within New York Location within the United States
- Interactive map of LaGrange Terrace
- Location: Lafayette Street, Manhattan, New York, US
- Coordinates: 40°43′46″N 73°59′32″W
- Area: NoHo
- Built: 1832
- Architectural style: Greek Revival
- NRHP reference No.: 76001242
- NYSRHP No.: 06101.000430, 06101.000433, 06101.000435, 06101.000436
- NYCL No.: 0010–0013

Significant dates
- Added to NRHP: December 12, 1976
- Designated NYSRHP: June 23, 1980
- Designated NYCL: October 14, 1965

Colonnade Row, also known as LaGrange Terrace, is a group of 1830s row houses on present-day Lafayette Street in the NoHo neighborhood of Manhattan in New York City. They are believed to have been built by Seth Geer, although the project has been attributed to a number of other architects. The buildings' original name comes from the Marquis de Lafayette's estate in France, but the series of nine row houses, of which four remain, owe their existence to John Jacob Astor, who bought the property and whose grandson John Jacob Astor III later lived at No. 424. The remaining buildings are New York City designated landmarks and listed on the National Register of Historic Places under the name LaGrange Terrace. The facades remain standing on Lafayette Street south of Astor Place.

== Design ==
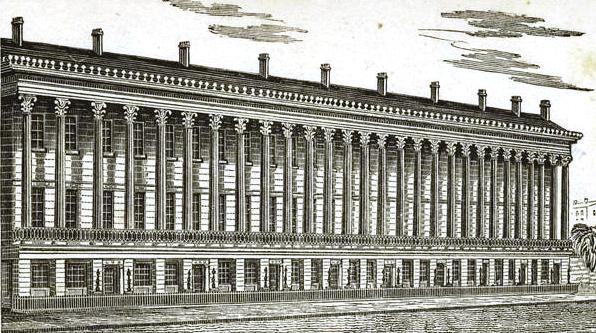
The original nine buildings

The nine original buildings, a series of Greek Revival townhouses—built by Seth Geer (or Greer), a contractor from Albany, New York—were located at 418–426 Lafayette Place on the site of the Vauxhall Gardens Amusement Park. The property on which these buildings were constructed had been bought by Astor in 1804 for $45,000, and when the lease for the Vauxhall Gardens was up, Astor built a wide street through the property from Great Jones Street to Art Street, which is now Astor Place, and named it Lafayette Place after the Marquis de Lafayette, a hero of the American Revolution. The original name of the buildings was Lagrange or La Grange Terrace, named after Lafayette's country estate, one of many places named in his honor in New York City and elsewhere in the United States, after his triumphant return tour in 1824–25.

The buildings each contained 26 rooms and were 27 feet (8.2 m) wide, with 15-foot (4.6 m) deep front yards, uncommon at the time. Their facades were made entirely of Westchester marble and linked with a colonnade of Corinthian columns providing the homes with their current name. The marble for the buildings was found at Sing Sing, where the convicts worked to cut it for use in construction.

The precise year of the buildings' construction, as well as the architect responsible are subject to some debate. The architects generally credited with Colonnade Row's design is Alexander Jackson Davis, Ithiel Town, and James Dakin, who were believed to have designed the homes for the Astor and Vanderbilt families. Town and Dakin are believed to have begun work on the project, which they called LaGrange Terrace, during the winter of 1831–32, during which they worked on a number of design projects. Davis is not believed to have played a role in the final construction of the building, which was completed in 1833 according to the Landmarks Commission, and there are some who believe that he did not work on the design at all.

Apart from John Jacob Astor III, Julia Gardiner (who would become President John Tyler's First Lady) lived on Colonnade Row, as did Cornelius Vanderbilt, Washington Irving, and Warren Delano. In addition, Columbia Law School held classes for a time in the house that was once occupied by Astor.

== Decline ==
At the time of their construction, Lafayette Place, which was then a cobblestone cul-de-sac, was the most fashionable area in New York City and one of the first to be developed in the city's expansion north of Canal Street. The upper-class demographics of the region shifted, and by 1860 Murray Hill was considered a better place to live, and the area around the former Lafayette Place fell into decline.

The original buildings located at 418–426 Lafayette Place were torn down following a failed proposal in 1902 to relocate the remaining structures to Bryant Park, after more than half were torn down to make room for Wanamaker's warehouse and department store. Some of the columns and decorative parts ended up in what is now known as Delbarton School, a Benedictine boys school in Morristown, New Jersey, located on the former estate of Luther Kountze. In 2009, one of the columns was put on display at the Metropolitan Museum of Art.

== Protection ==
The four buildings that remain, numbers 428, 430, 432, and 434 Lafayette Street, were among the first to be landmarked when New York City began doing so in 1965, despite having been sub-divided into apartments and commercial properties, altered and generally in poor condition. The public hearings regarding the landmarking were held on September 21, 1965 at which time a number of people supported the landmarking and the owners presented no objections. The buildings were added to the National Register of Historic Places in December 1976 after being nominated in August of the same year.

In 1995, the owners for 428 and 430, the Casper R. Callen Trust, c/o Salon Realty, announced plans to restore the buildings. However, this has not yet happened due in part to cost.

== See also ==
- Astor Place Theatre
- List of New York City Designated Landmarks in Manhattan below 14th Street
- National Register of Historic Places listings in Manhattan below 14th Street
