= Hanna Eshel =

Israel-born sculptor

Hanna Eshel חנה אשאל
- Born: Hanna Malka Baltinester; September 5, 1926; Jerusalem, Mandatory Palestine
- Died: September 18, 2023 (aged 97); New York City, U.S.
- Education: Bezalel School of Art, Atelier Nicoli
- Known for: Sculpture, collage, painting

Hanna Eshel (Hebrew: חנה אשאל; September 5, 1926 - September 9, 2023) was a multi-disciplinary artist, known for her collage, oil painting and marble sculptures exploring elemental forms and themes of fractured space — a body of work, largely unnoticed until late in her career.

== Background ==
Born Hanna Malka Baltinester in Jerusalem (variously reported as Palestine) in 1926, to Chaim Baltinester who operated a jewelry shop and Dina (Freedman) Baltinester, who raised six children.

Eshel studied at the Bezalel School of Art, served as Lieutenant of Cartography in the Israeli Air Force during the 1948 Palestine war, and changed her last name to Eshel. She subsequently moved to Paris in 1952, studying painting and fresco at the Académie de la Grande Chaumière and the Ecole des Beaux-Arts, where she received the first prize in the Concours de France.

In Paris, Eshel married Isaac Israel, with whom she had son, Ory — subsequently moving to Carrara, Italy; divorcing and moving to New York in 1978. She published her memoir, Michelangelo and Me: Six Years in My Carrara Haven, in 1996 (Midmarch Arts Press, digitized 2007).

Eshel died September 18, 2023, in a New York assisted living facility, survived by her son and three grandchildren.

== Career ==
Having moved to Paris in 1952, Eshel remained in France until 1972, creating oil paintings, paper collages, and burlap collage-paintings — and integrating feminist imagery into her work. Her works were exhibited at the Musée d'Art Moderne de Paris.

Eshel's art gradually became more sculptural, with some of her burlap collage-paintings being double-sided with clefts and breaks. She began experimenting with sculpture, moving to Carrara, Italy, where she remained for six years, studying at Atelier Nicoli and meeting famed artists Isamu Noguchi and Henry Moore — and receiving the Fiori Carrara prize.

In 1978, Eshel moved to New York City, transporting ten tons of marble, some of it moved by crane through a window of her rent-controlled NoHo loft. Where she had participated in numerous shows (especially for a woman, at the time) in Paris, by contrast in New York she gradually stopped promoting her work, pursuing her work in sculpture, painting photography and paper construction mostly alone in her loft.

Eshel was featured in exhibitions in Tel Aviv, Copenhagen, Paris, Brussels and Antwerp.

== 2012 Rediscovery ==
Eshel met an art consultant, Quinn Luke, when she advertised for a roommate. Luke moved in, noting Eshel's body of work, and introduced her to Patrick Parrish, who operated the Mondo Cane Gallery across the street from Eshel's loft. Parrish discovered numerous work still unpacked from Eshel's moved from Paris, and organized a successful solo exhibition at his gallery, resulting in wide attention, including by The New York Times, 1stdibs, Introspective Magazine and Sight Unseen. Other exhibitions included at the galleries of Todd Merrill and Glenn Horowitz.

A 2022 exhibition introduction described Eshel's work as "marked with deep fissures, collages striped with chasms, and canvases that erupted with bursts of paint recalling female anatomy, deep-space explosions, and her own tenacity." The Todd Merrill Studio described her work as"very futuristic and minimalist, while at the same time draws references from ancient civilizations.”
