= Mile End Delicatessen =

Coordinates: 40.687483°N 73.987052°W

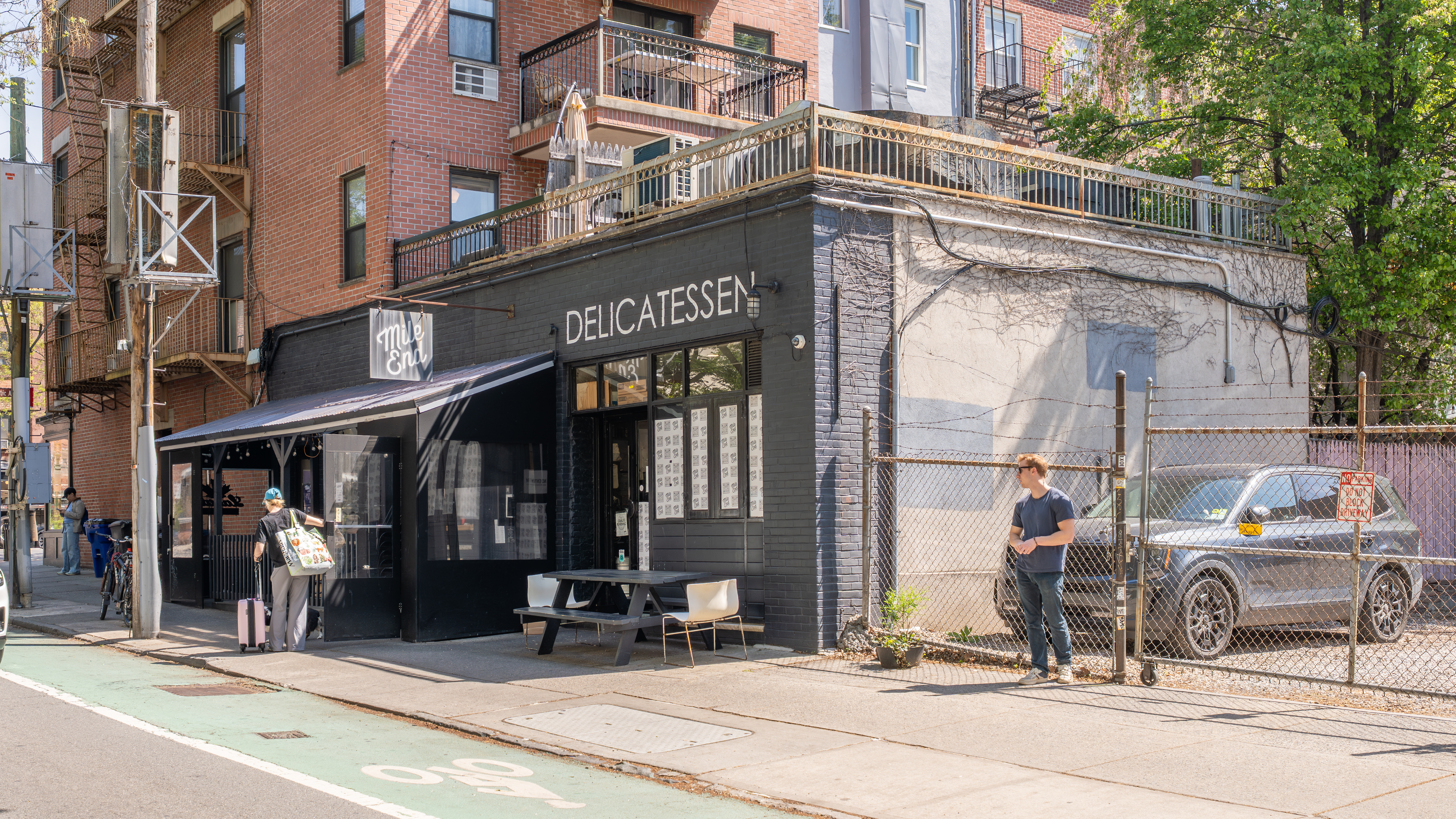
- Interactive map of Mile End Delicatessen

Restaurant information
- Established: 2010
- Owners: Noah Bernamoff; Rae Cohen
- Food type: Jewish delicatessen
- Dress code: Casual
- Location: 97 Hoyt St, Brooklyn, New York, 11217, United States
- Website: Official website

Mile End Delicatessen, is a Jewish deli in Boerum Hill, Brooklyn which opened in 2010 and is named after the neighborhood in Montreal, Quebec, Canada. The deli has been highly rated and is currently run by Joel Tietolman.

The deli is known for their Montreal-Canadian spin on classic Jewish dishes, as well as their smoked meat.

== Mile End Sandwich ==
Mile End Delicatessen opened a second location on Bond Street in Manhattan called Mile End Sandwich. Ligaya Mishan of The New York Times described the second location as lacking "the homeyness and pluck of its Brooklyn progenitor". Mile End Sandwich closed in October, 2018.

== See also ==
- List of Ashkenazi Jewish restaurants
- List of delicatessens
