= New York Vauxhall Gardens =

19th-century entertainment venue

Coordinates: 40.717°N 74.010°W

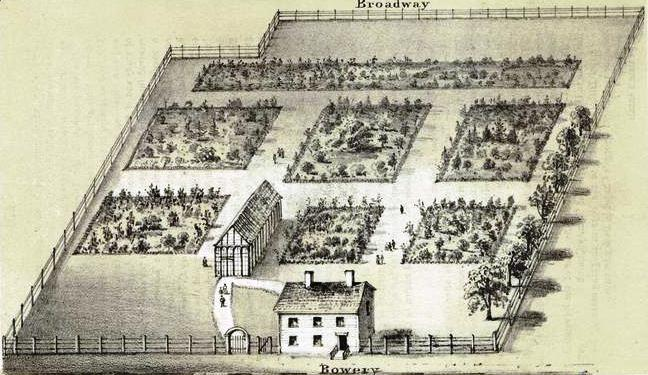
The Vauxhall Gardens, Broome Street New York City, its second location, 1803

The Vauxhall Gardens was a pleasure garden and theater in New York City. It was named for the Vauxhall Gardens of London. Though the venue passed through a long list of owners, and suffered buyouts, closings, relocations, and re-openings, it lasted until the mid-19th century.

== History ==
=== Vauxhall Gardens, Greenwich Street ===
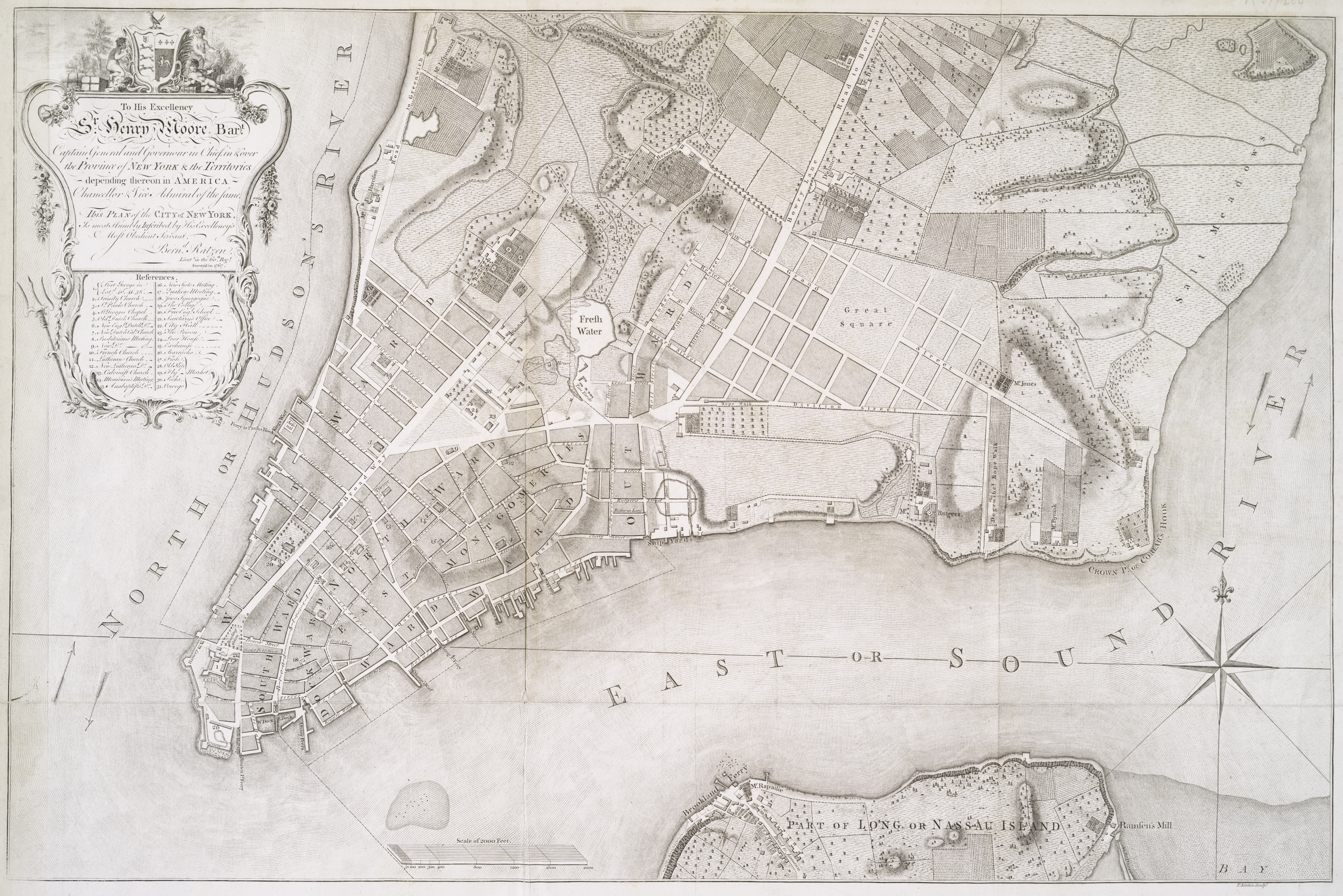
Vauxhall Gardens (right of "O" in "HUDSON'S", between streets labeled Warren and Chapel and Road to Greenwich), Ranelagh Gardens is lower left, west of "Fresh Water", from Bernard Ratzer's ("Survey'd in 1767") map of New York,

In the mid-1760s, out-of-town taverns, such as John Clapp's in the Bowery, had become popular in Colonial New York, taking advantage of the "Sunset Strip-like" jurisdiction, two miles from the post office. At a site called "Bowling Green" since 1722, Samuel Fraunces opened a pleasure garden, first called the Vaux-Hall Gardens, in New York, in 1767 and it received a chief competitor in the much larger Ranelagh Gardens, (named after Ranelagh Gardens, Chelsea, London), both appear on Bernard Ratzer's map of New York of 1767 occupying a wooded rise of ground just north of the northernmost city houses, on the south side of Duane Street; the site overlooked Lispenard's Meadows and the riverfront road to Greenwich Village. The original Vauxhall Gardens was located in a smaller site on Greenwich Street near the Hudson River between what later became Warren and Chambers streets in the fashionable Sixth Ward; Public School 234 stands at the site today. Ratzer's map shows its square garden plot, conventionally divided in four by walks. Fraunces operated Vaux-Hall through Summer 1773; in October, he auctioned its contents and sold the property. His notice mentioned two large gardens, a house with four rooms per floor and twelve fireplaces, and a dining hall that was 56 feet (17 m) long and 26 feet (7.9 m) wide, with a kitchen below. The Vauxhall offered light summer concerts and featured an outdoor wax museum. For the summer 1768 season, it hosted an exhibit on the life of Scipio Africanus that included a grove with a reconstruction of the military leader at his tent. The Vauxhall remained popular throughout the Colonial period of New York and to the end of the 18th century.

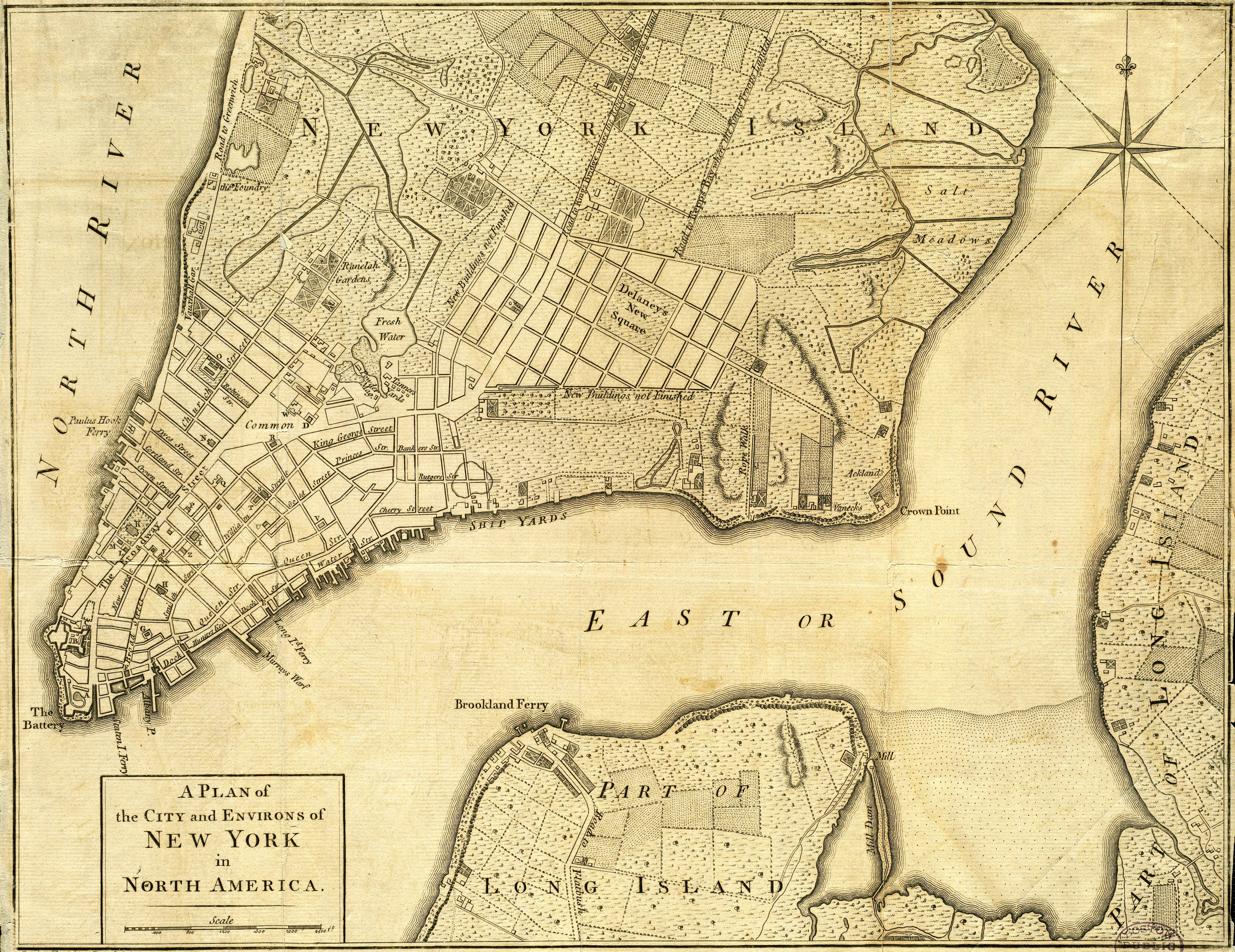
Vauxhall Gardens (right of the "H" in "NORTH RIVER"), Ranelagh Gardens (west of "Fresh Water"), on a British map of 1776

=== Vauxhall Gardens, Broome Street ===
By this point, the gardens had two namesake competitors, one of which was primarily popular for its ice cream.

As New York City expanded, streets of rowhouses with rear gardens took over the land occupied by the Vauxhall Gardens. In 1798, owner Joseph Delacroix moved his operations to Broome Street between Broadway and the Bowery.

=== Vauxhall Gardens, Lafayette Street ===
In 1805, it moved, this time to Lafayette Street, stretching from 4th to 8th streets in what were then the northern reaches of the city, the area that later became Astor Place, 4th Street, Broadway, and the Bowery. Its theater's boxes faced the garden and blocked the stage from the street. Professional travel writer John Lambert visited in November 1807 and wrote,

New York has its Vauxhall and Ranelagh; but they are poor imitations of those near London. They are, however, pleasant places of recreation for the inhabitants. The Vauxhall garden is situated in the Bowery Road about two miles (3 km) from the City Hall. It is a neat plantation, with gravel walks adorned with shrubs, trees, busts, and statues. In the centre is a large equestrian statue of General Washington. Light musical pieces, interludes, etc. are performed in a small theatre situate in one corner of the gardens: the audience sit in what are called the pit and boxes, in the open air. The orchestra is built among the trees, and a large apparatus is constructed for the display of fireworks. The theatrical corps of New York is chiefly engaged at Vauxhall during summer....

== Astor Place Area ==
The Vauxhall Gardens, Lafayette Street, area later belonged to John Jacob Astor. In 1826, he carved out an upper-class neighborhood from the site with Lafayette Street bisecting eastern gardens from western homes. Wealthy New Yorkers, including Astor and other members of the family, built mansions along this central thoroughfare. Astor built the Astor Library Building in the eastern portion of the neighborhood as a donation to the city. Architect Seth Geer designed eye-catching row houses called LaGrange Terrace for the development, and the area became a fashionable, upper-class residential district.

This location made the gardens accessible to the people of both the Broadway and Bowery districts. In the summer of 1838, the owners opened a saloon for the staging of vaudeville comic operas. Later theatre managers expanded the offerings to appeal to a wider range of patrons. By 1850, the rowdier crowds of the Bowery had mostly scared off the upper classes, and revenues suffered. The theater buildings were demolished in 1855, and the gardens closed for the last time in 1859.

== See also ==
- Astor Library
- Astor Place
- Astor Place Riot
- Colonnade Row
