= Bernard Ratzer =

Bernard Ratzer was a British cartographer, best known for his 18th-century maps of early New York City. Today, his name is invoked as something of a Da Vinci of New York cartography, as his best known work was the 1770 "Plan of the City of New York".

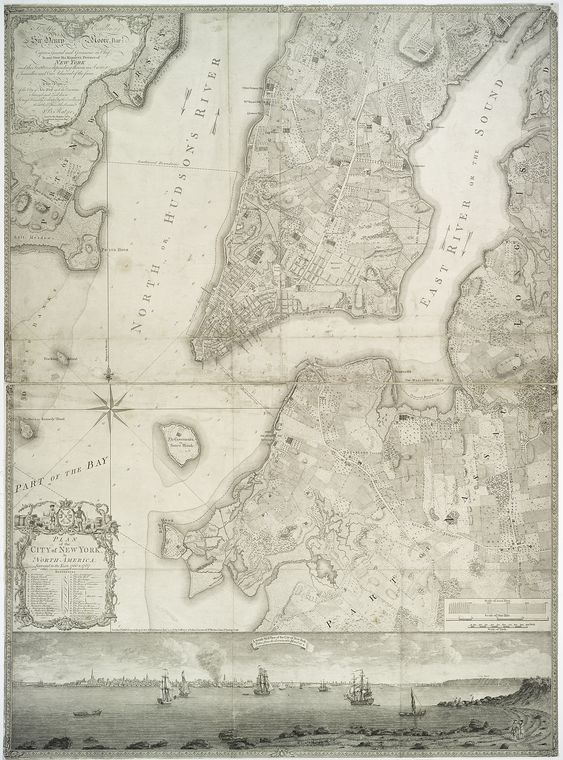
Plan of the City of New York, surveyed by Bernard Ratzer in 1766–7

Ratzer was a British Army officer who spent his time in America working as a surveyor and draftsman. He was, in particular, assigned to survey America's eastern coastline during the French and Indian War and later into the early stages of the American Revolution. He worked alongside his more well-known contemporaries Claude J. Sauthier, Samuel Holland and Thomas Jefferys.

One of his earliest drafts of the "Plan of the City of New York," which shows in great detail many of the time's most famous landmarks in addition to a small illustration of Manhattan as seen from Governor's Island, was given to George III, England's king, as a gesture from the publishers.

A fourth version of Ratzer's most famous map was recently found in a Connecticut storage facility and was restored in 2011 for the Brooklyn Historical Society.

A librarian at Harvard University discovered a 1769 Ratzer map showing the disputed border between New York and New Jersey. The Harvard libraries made this map publicly available in early 2016.
