= Lafayette Street =

Street in Manhattan, New York

Coordinates: 40°43′35.57″N 73°59′39.3″W

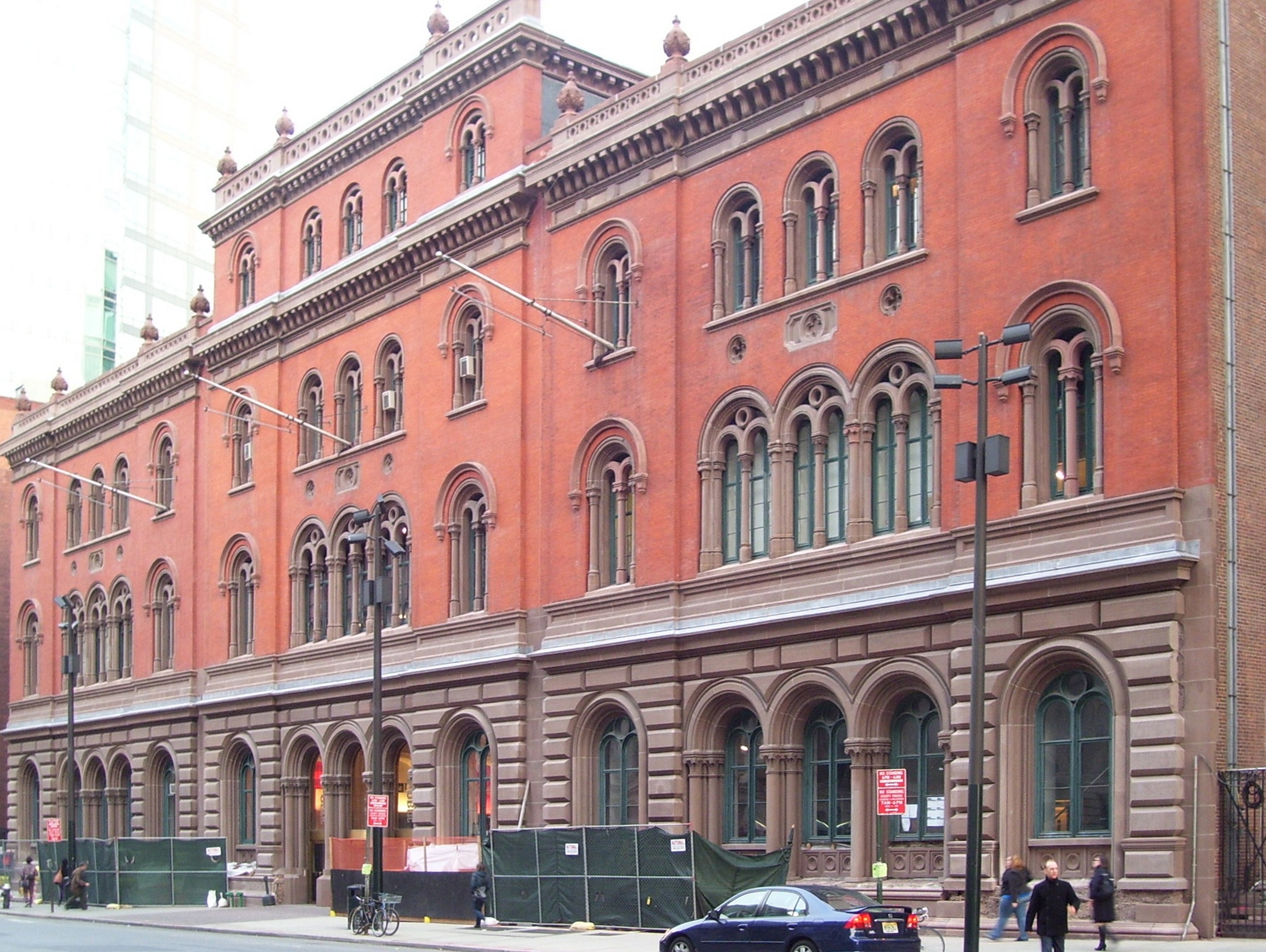
- The Public Theater at the Astor Library Building
- Lafayette Street
- Width: 50 feet (15 m)
- North end: East 9th Street
- South end: Reade Street below Foley Square
- East: Centre Street
- West: Broadway

Lafayette Street (/ˌlæfiˈɛt, ˌlɑːf-/ LA(H)-F-ee-ET) is a major north–south street in Lower Manhattan, New York City. It originates at the intersection of Reade Street and Centre Street, one block north of Chambers Street. The one-way street then successively runs through Chinatown, Little Italy, NoLIta, and NoHo and finally, between East 9th and East 10th streets, merges with Fourth Avenue. A buffered bike lane runs outside the left traffic lane. North of Spring Street, Lafayette Street is northbound (uptown)-only; south of Spring Street, Lafayette is southbound (downtown)-only.

The street is named after the Marquis de Lafayette, a French hero of the American Revolutionary War.

== History ==
=== Early years (1804–1887) ===
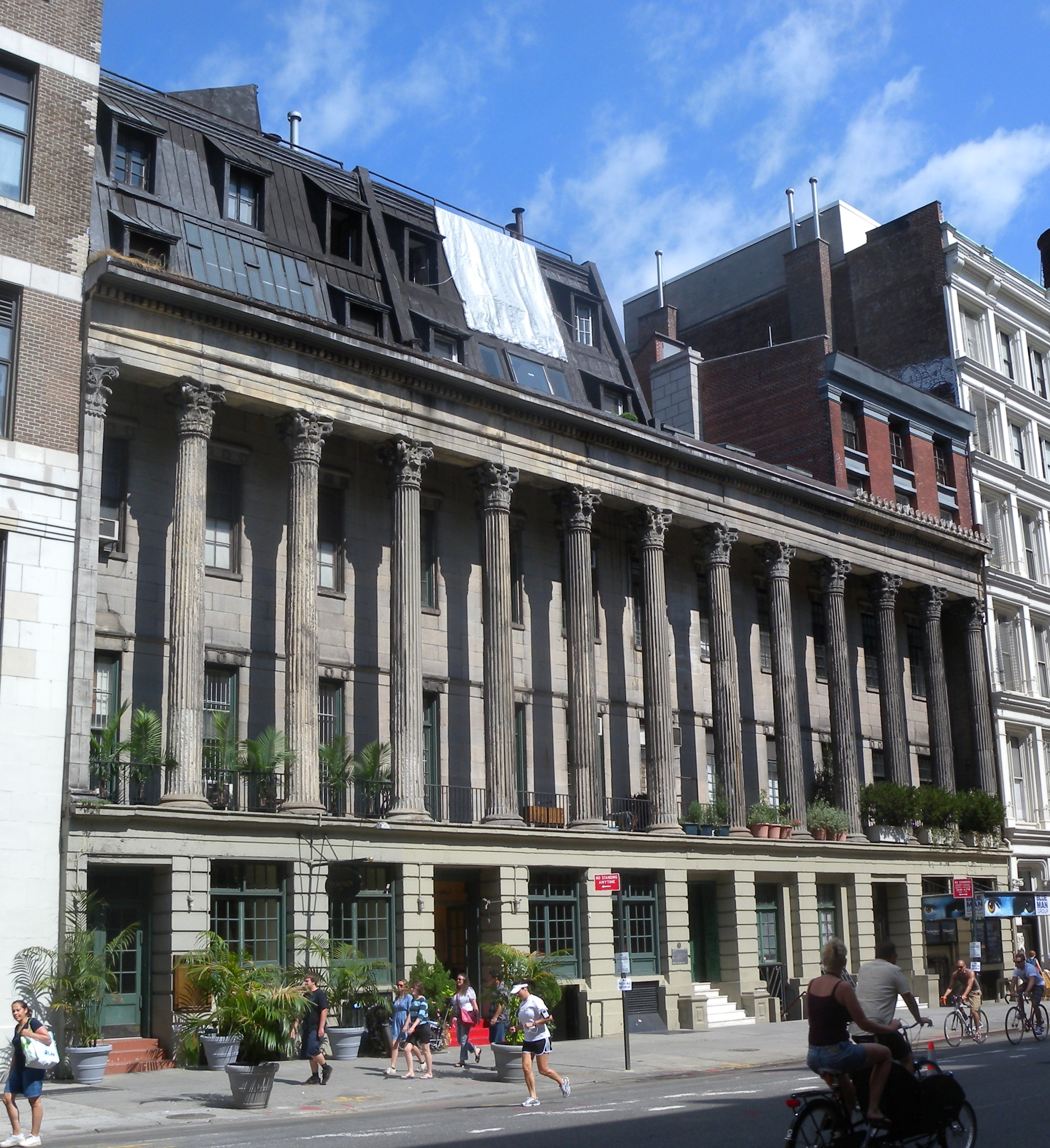
Colonnade Row (1832)

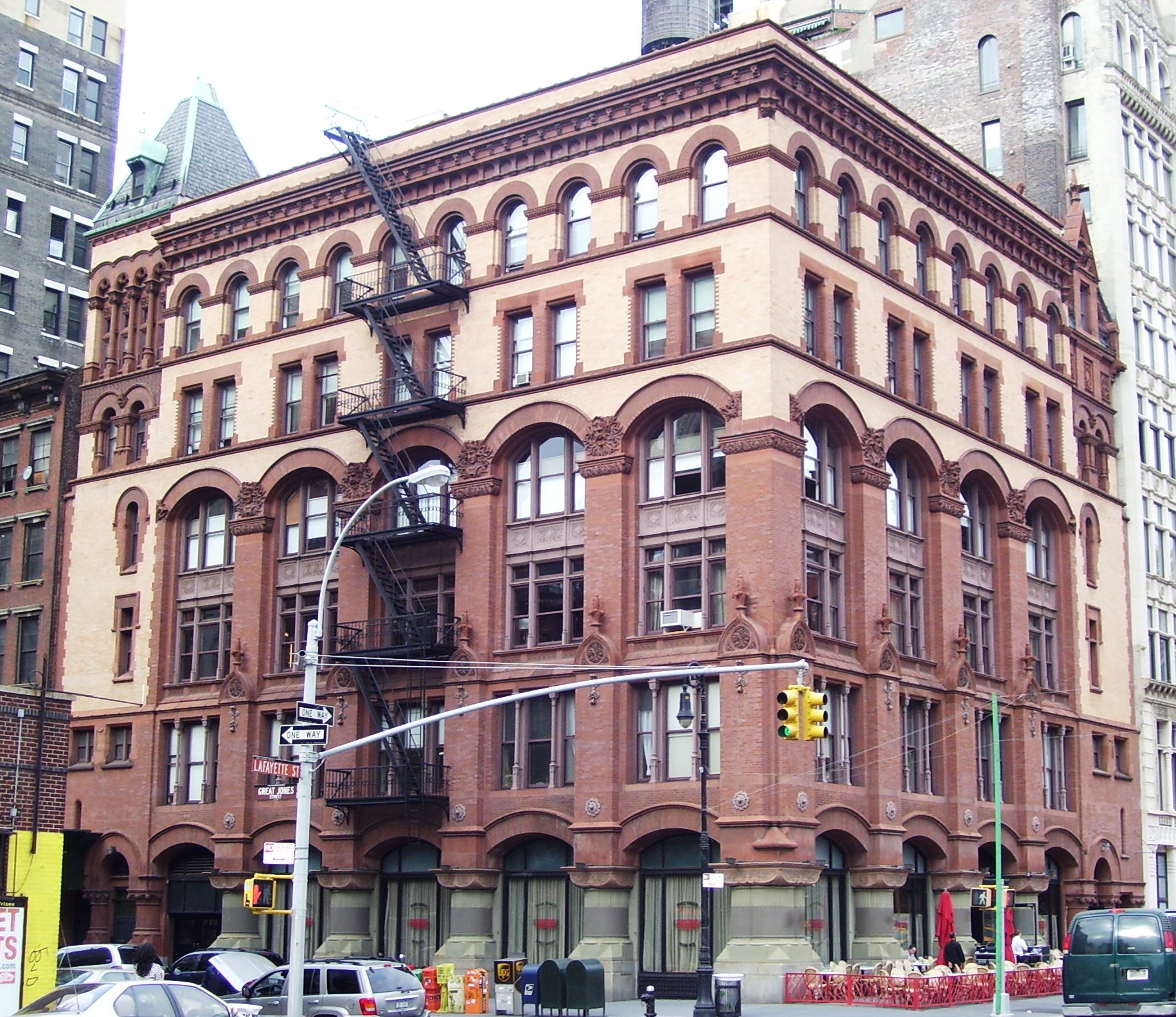
Commercial Romanesque: the Schermerhorn Building (Henry Janeway Hardenbergh, 1888) at 3rd Street

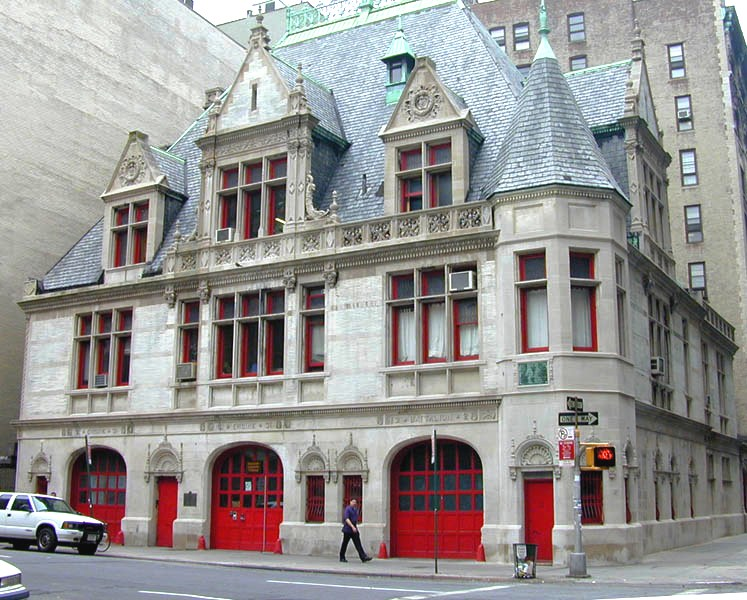
Firehouse, Engine Company 31, at 87 Lafayette at White Street (Napoleon LeBrun, 1896) is now the Downtown Community Television Center

The street originated as a real estate speculation by John Jacob Astor, who had bought a large market garden in 1804, for $45,000, and leased part of the site to a Frenchman named Joseph Delacroix, who erected a popular resort and called it "Vauxhall Gardens" after the famous resort on the edge of London. When the lease expired in 1825, Astor cut a new street through, a 100-foot wide three-block boulevard with no cross streets, which began at Astor Place and ended at Great Jones Street which he named Lafayette Place to commemorate the Revolutionary war hero, who had returned to a rapturous reception in America the previous year. Lots along both sides of the new street sold briskly, earning Astor many times what he had paid for the land two decades before. The grandest was the terrace of matching marble-fronted Greek Revival houses on the west side of the street, called La Grange Terrace when it was built in 1833, but known to New Yorkers as "Colonnade Row" for the two-story order of Corinthian columns that unified its fronts; the nine residences each sold for as much as $30,000; four that remain are the only survivors of the first fashionable residential phase of Lafayette Street, which gained its new name when the city extended the street south in the early 1900s. At that time its route was carved from the former Elm Street, Marion Street, and Lafayette Place and connected to Centre Street at the Municipal Building.

=== Later developments (1888–present) ===
The change in Lafayette Street's history is epitomized by the construction of the Schermerhorn Building in 1888 to replace the Schermerhorn mansion, where Mrs. William Colford Schermerhorn had redecorated the interior to resemble Louis XV's Versailles, it was thought, to give a French-themed costume ball in 1854 for six hundred New Yorkers, at which the German Cotillion was introduced in America. A sign of changing times, in 1860 the W.C. Schermerhorns moved uptown to 49 West 23rd Street. Before long, half of Colonnade Row was demolished to make way for a warehouse for Wanamaker's Department Store. Wanamaker's had taken over A.T. Stewart's palatial dry-goods store that occupied the full block between Broadway and Lafayette and 9th and 10th Streets, and had also built an equally gigantic Annex next door between 8th and 9th Streets, with a skywalk connecting the two buildings. The main store burnt down in 1956, but the annex and warehouse buildings remain extant on Lafayette.

== Landmarks ==
Landmarks along Lafayette Street include:

- The New York Mercantile Library building at Astor Place (George E. Harney, arch., 1891), once the site of the Astor Opera House, now condominiums
- Alamo, a cube-shaped sculpture in Astor Place
- Astor Library Building (1854), founded by John Jacob Astor, now housing The Public Theater
- Colonnade Row (1833), four of a series of nine Greek Revival row houses; the Astor Place Theatre is in one
- The De Vinne Press Building at Fourth Street
- The Schermerhorn Building, built for the Schermerhorns in 1888 to designs by Henry Janeway Hardenbergh, to replace the Schermerhorn mansion.
- 339 Lafayette Street, dubbed the "Peace Pentagon" for the many left-wing organizations which were once headquartered there, including the War Resisters League
- The Puck Building on East Houston Street
- The New York City Rescue Mission on White Street
- The Firehouse, Engine Company 31 building is located at 87 Lafayette at White Street, built in 1895 by Napoleon LeBrun, now the Downtown Community Television Center (DCTV)
- The Ahrens Building, built by George Henry Griebel, and the City Municipal Court Building on the south side of White Street
- Family Court on Franklin Street
- The Department of Health, Hospitals and Sanitation on Leonard Street
- Federal Plaza, which includes the Jacob Javits Federal Building on Worth Street
- Foley Square, named after Tammany Hall's "Big Tom" Foley, on Pearl Street
- The SoHo-Cast Iron Historic District Extension

== Summer Streets ==
In August 2008, the New York City Department of Transportation closed Lafayette Street, Park Avenue, and part of East 72nd Street to motor traffic for three Saturdays as part of the "Summer Streets" program to encourage non-motor uses. The program has taken place on the first, second, and third Saturdays of August every year since then.

== Transportation ==
The New York City Subway's 4, 6, <6>, B, D, F, <F>, and M trains intersect at a subway station complex at Bleecker Street / Broadway – Lafayette Street. The IRT Lexington Avenue Line (4, 5, 6, and <6> trains) runs under Lafayette Street, with stops at Canal Street, Spring Street, Bleecker Street, and Astor Place, as well as a former stop at Worth Street.

The westbound M22 runs on Lafayette Street south of Worth Street, while the full-route uptown M1 runs north of Spring Street.

== Gallery ==
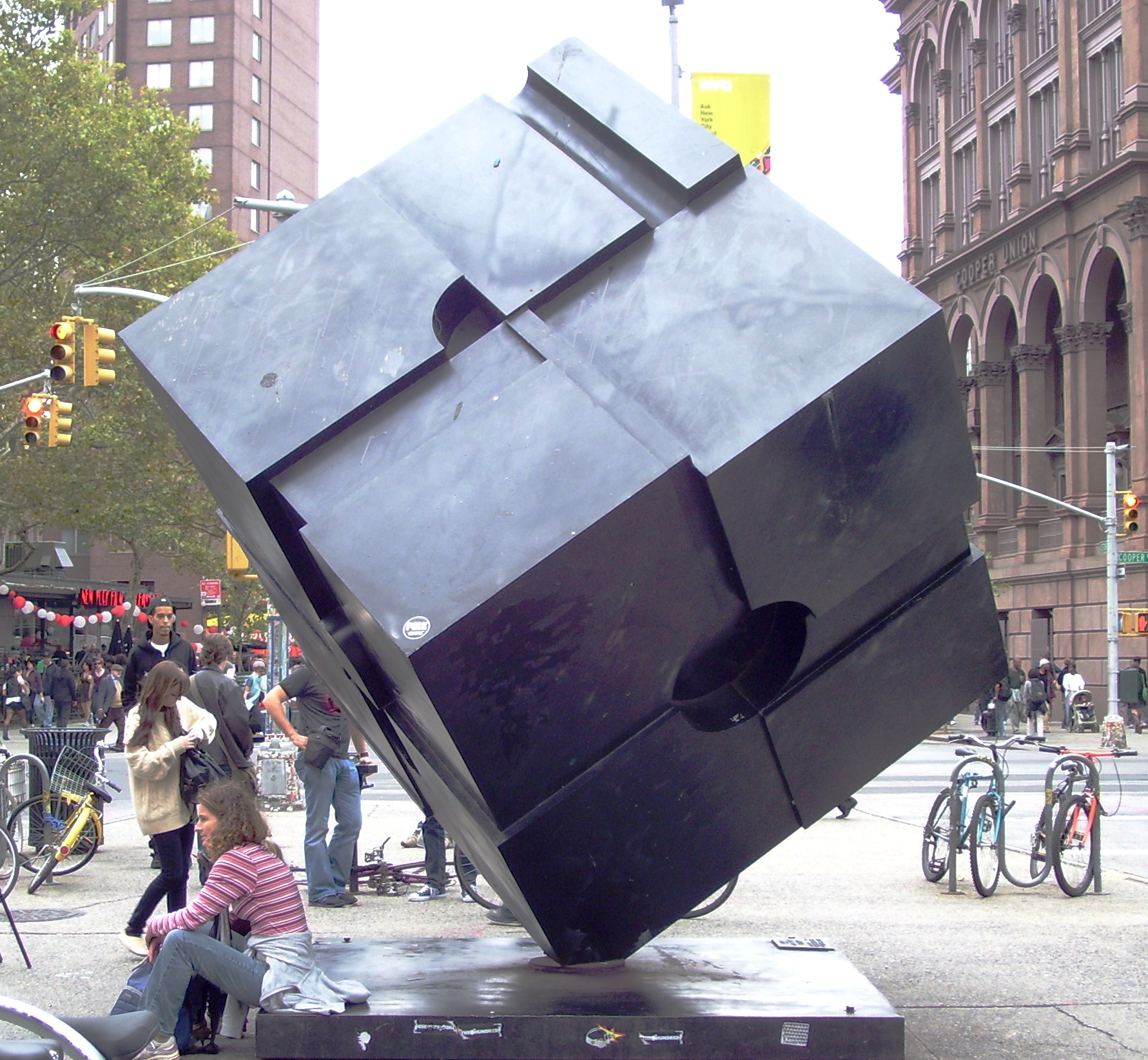
The Cube (Alamo by Tony Rosenthal) at Astor Place

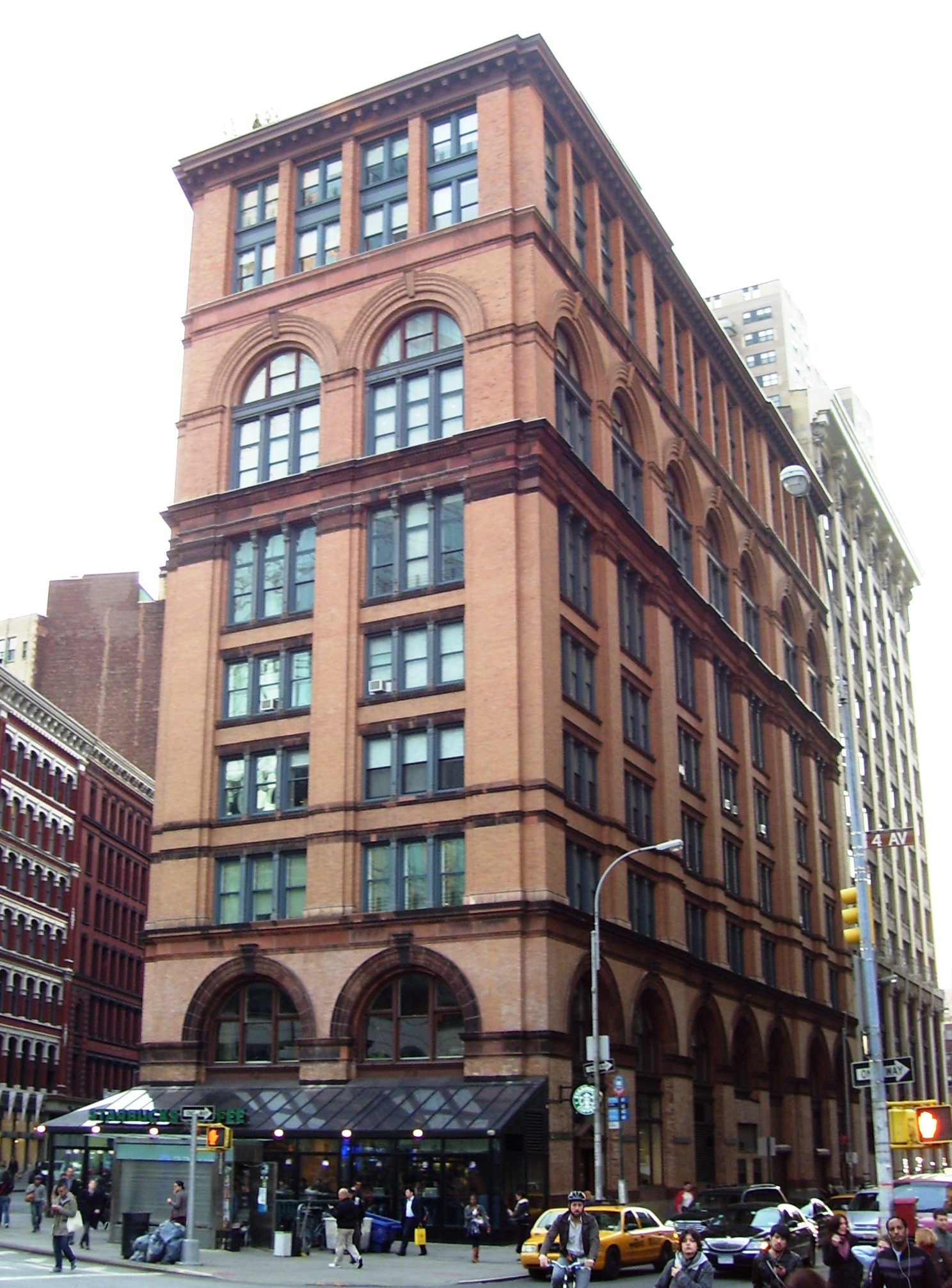
"Clinton Hall", at Astor Place, was the home of the New York Mercantile Library, and the site of the Astor Opera House where the Astor Place riot of 1849 took place

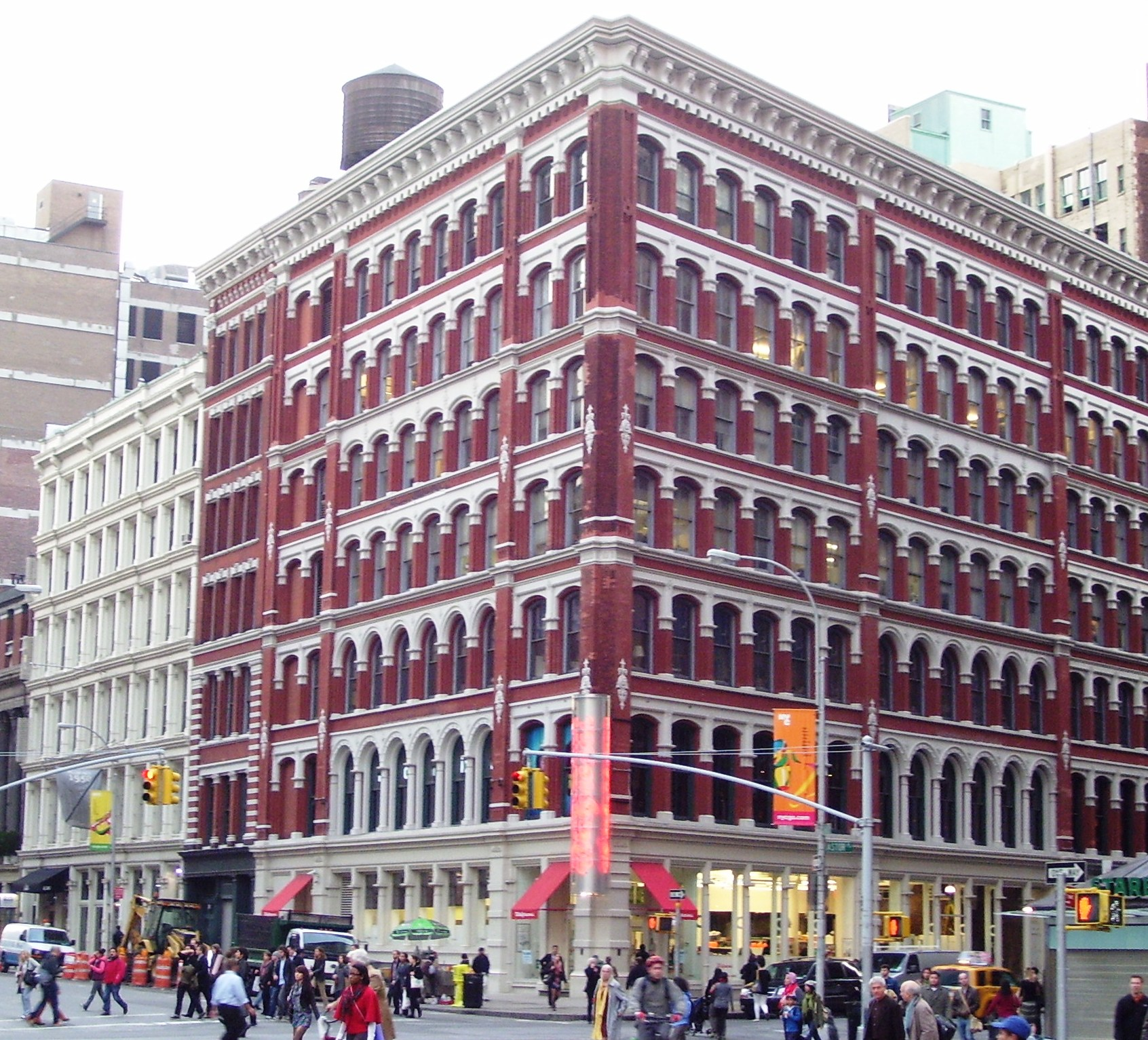
The Astor Place Building at 444 Lafayette

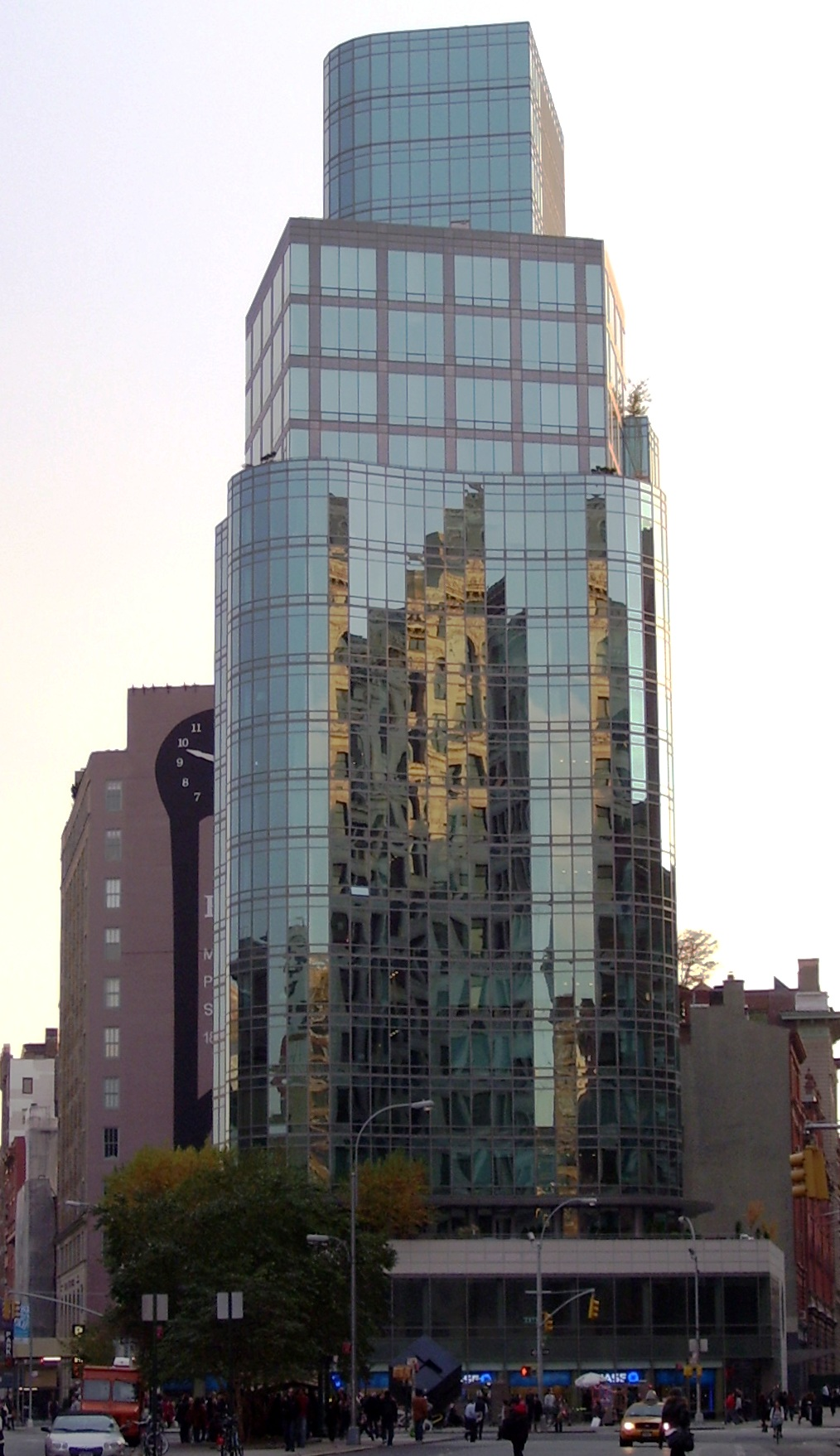
Condominium building at 445 Lafayette

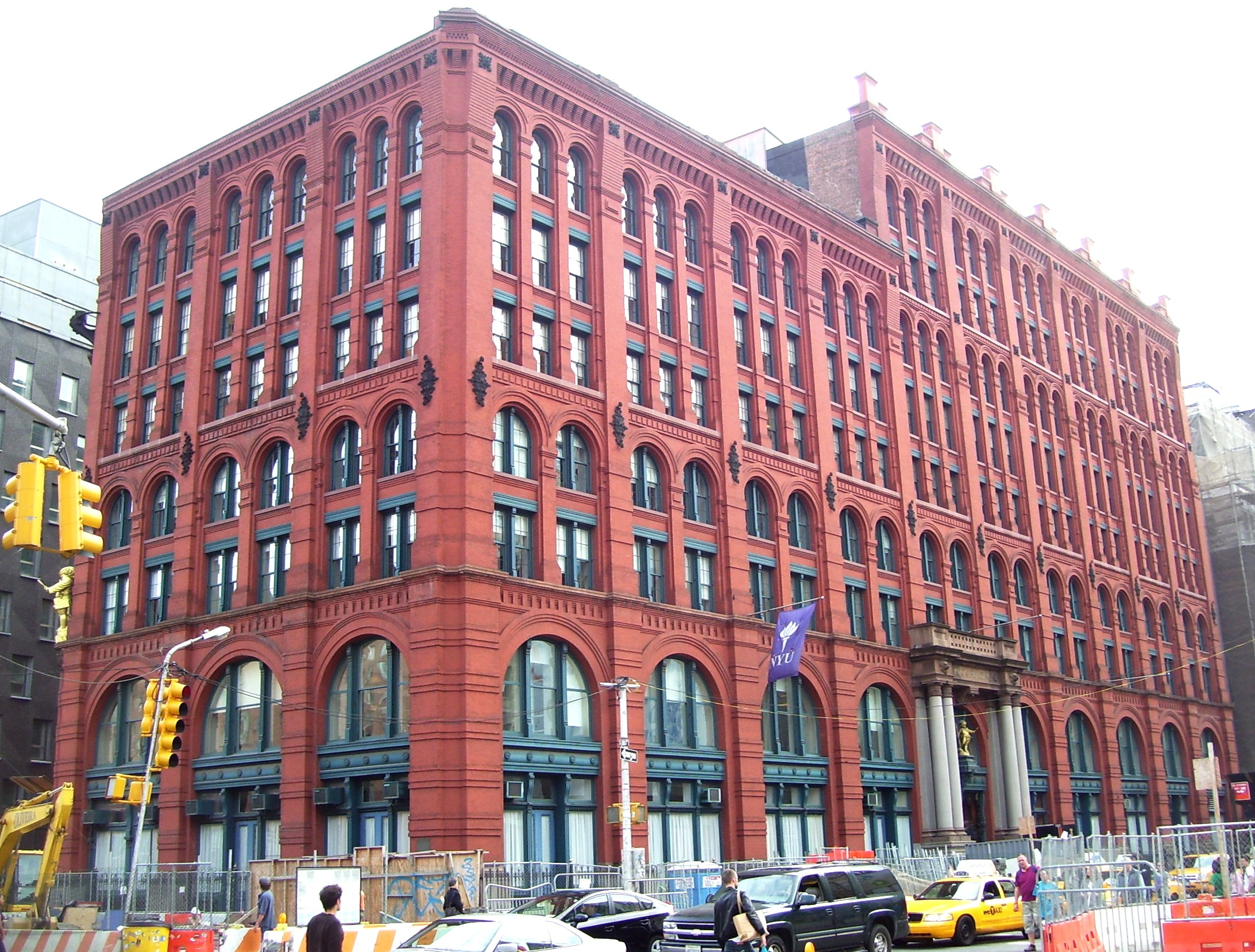
The Puck Building, former printing plant for Puck magazine, was built in stages and designed by Albert Wagner

== See also ==
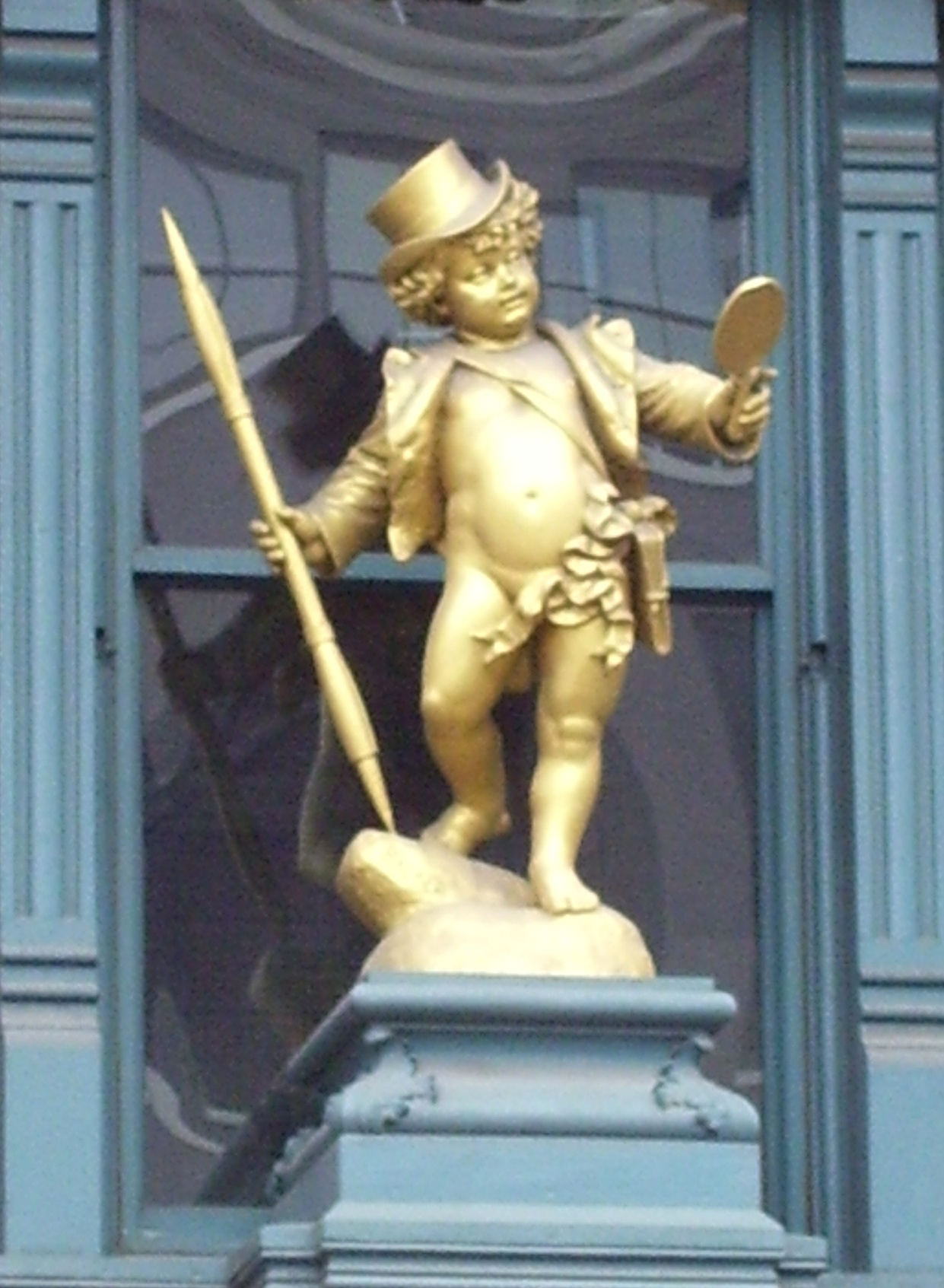
Gilded statue of Puck over the front door of the Puck Building

- Lower Manhattan
- Lower East Side
- Merchant's House Museum
- NoHo
