= Scribner =

Scribner may refer to:

== Media ==
- Charles Scribner's Sons, also known as Scribner or Scribner's, New York City publisher
- Scribner's Magazine, pictorial published from 1887–1939 by Charles Scribner's Sons, then merged with the Commentator which continued until 1942
- Scribner’s Monthly, literary periodical published from 1870–1881, when it changed names to The Century Magazine, which continued until 1930, when it was merged with The Forum.
- Scribner's Bookstores, owned by Barnes & Noble

== Places ==
- Scribner, Nebraska, city in Dodge County, Nebraska

== People ==
- Belding Hibbard Scribner (1921–2003), one of the pioneers of kidney dialysis
- Charles Scribner, the name of several members of a New York publishing family associated with Charles Scribner's Sons
- Wiley Scribner (1840–1889), American politician
- John Blair Scribner (1850–1879), president of Charles Scribner's Sons
- Frank Lamson Scribner (1851–1938), American botanist, mycologist, a pioneer in plant pathology in the United States
- Lucy Skidmore Scribner (1853–1931), founder of Skidmore College
- Arthur Hawley Scribner (1859–1932), president of Charles Scribner's Sons
- Sam A. Scribner (1859–1941), American businessman
- William M. Scribner (1877–1936), American politician
- Rod Scribner (1910–1976), American animator
- James M. Scribner (1920–?) United States Navy
- Sylvia Scribner (1923–1991), American psychologist and educational researcher
- Rick Scribner (born 1952), American racing driver
- George Scribner (born 1952), Panamanian-American animator
- Troy Scribner (born 1991), American baseball player
