= Charles Scribner =

Charles Scribner is the name of several members of a New York publishing family associated with Charles Scribner's Sons:

- Charles Scribner I (1821–1871)
- Charles Scribner II (1854–1930)
- Charles Scribner III (1890–1952)
- Charles Scribner IV (1921–1995)
