= Charles Scribner's Sons Building =

Commercial building in Manhattan, New York

597 Fifth Avenue
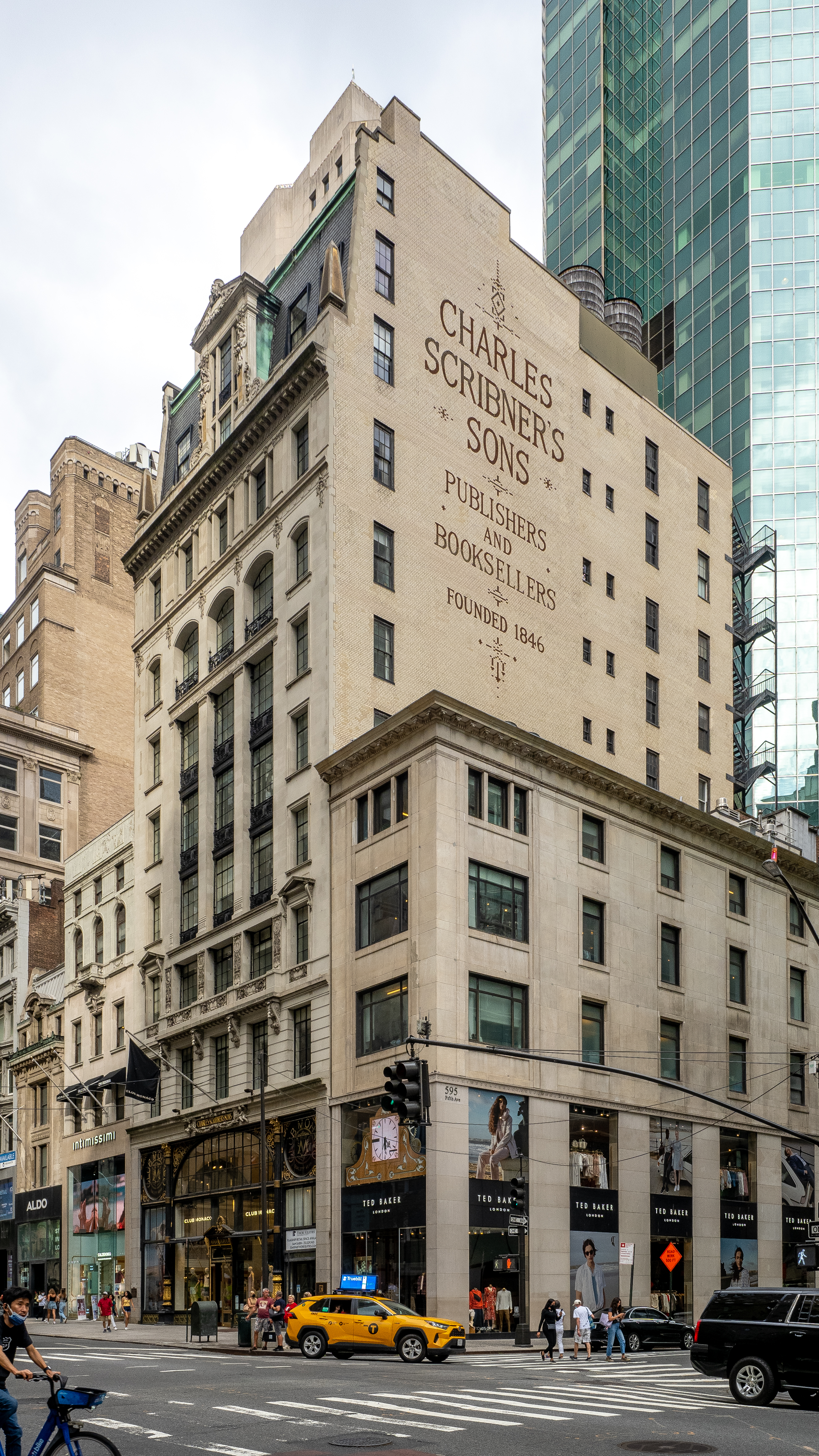
- Interactive map of the 597 Fifth Avenue area
- Alternative names: Charles Scribner's Sons Building

General information
- Architectural style: Beaux-Arts
- Location: Manhattan, New York
- Coordinates: 40°45′27″N 73°58′40″W
- Construction started: 1912
- Completed: 1913
- Opening: May 18, 1913
- Renovated: 1974 (interior), 1996

Technical details
- Floor count: 10

Design and construction
- Architect: Ernest Flagg
- Main contractor: George A. Just Co. (steel), John T. Brady & Co. (masonry)

New York State Register of Historic Places
- Designated: July 23, 1982
- Reference no.: 06101.007107
- Designated entity: Building

New York City Landmark
- Designated: March 23, 1982
- Reference no.: 1100
- Designated entity: Exterior

New York City Landmark
- Designated: July 11, 1989
- Reference no.: 1698
- Designated entity: Retail interior

The Charles Scribner's Sons Building, also known as 597 Fifth Avenue, is a commercial structure in the Midtown Manhattan neighborhood of New York City, on Fifth Avenue between 48th and 49th Streets. Designed by Ernest Flagg in a Beaux Arts style, it was built from 1912 to 1913 for the Scribner's Bookstore.

The Fifth Avenue facade contains a glass-and-iron storefront on its lowest two stories with black and gold decoration. On the third through ninth stories, the facade is subdivided into five limestone bays, while at the tenth story is a mansard roof. Among the facade's details are vertical piers with four medallions containing busts of printers: Benjamin Franklin, William Caxton, Johann Gutenberg, and Aldus Manutius. The interior of the first two stories contains a retail space that initially served as a location of the Scribner's Bookstore. The upper stories contain offices, including some space that was initially used by the Scribner's publishing company.

The Charles Scribner's Sons Building was constructed to supersede a previous bookstore at 155 Fifth Avenue. The building was owned by Scribner's until 1984, when it was sold to the Cohen family, which subsequently sold it to the Benetton Group. After the bookstore in the lowest two stories closed in 1989, the building has housed numerous retail shops. A&A Investment Co. bought 597 Fifth Avenue in 2006 and it was sold to Thor Equities in 2011. The New York City Landmarks Preservation Commission designated 597 Fifth Avenue as an official landmark in 1982 and designated the ground-floor interior as a landmark in 1989.

== Site ==
The Charles Scribner's Sons Building is at 597 Fifth Avenue in the Midtown Manhattan neighborhood of New York City, on the eastern side of the avenue between 49th Street to the north and 48th Street to the south. The land lot covers 5,341 square feet (496.2 m^{2}) with a frontage of 53.41 feet (16.28 m) on Fifth Avenue and a depth of 100 feet (30 m). Nearby buildings include 600 Fifth Avenue to the west, 608 Fifth Avenue to the northwest and Tower 49 to the east.

== Architecture ==
597 Fifth Avenue was designed by Ernest Flagg in the Beaux Arts style for the company Charles Scribner's Sons. The building is ten stories tall (Note: It is also described as eleven stories.) and is of non-load-bearing construction. It is similar in appearance to the predecessor Scribner's bookstore at 155 Fifth Avenue, which Flagg also designed; both structures have symmetrical limestone facades divided horizontally into multiple sections. Flagg said of 597 Fifth Avenue's design, "I think the building is the best thing I ever did." The structure was erected by steel contractor George A. Just Co. and masonry contractor John T. Brady & Co., with additional materials from painter William F. Eastberg & Co., wiring contractor Peet & Powers, and plastering contractor H. W. Miller.

=== Facade ===
The facade is largely subdivided into five vertical bays, except at the two lowest stories, which contain a tripartite storefront. The storefront has glazed glass windows, dark ironwork, and brass-colored trim. The center section of the storefront corresponds to three bays in the upper stories. It has a centrally positioned double door, atop which is a broken pediment with the Scribner bookstore's logo at the center. The leftmost bay has another shop window while the rightmost bay leads to a separate lobby for the upper stories. At the top of the storefront are clerestory windows. The window in the center is a broad elliptical arch flanked by fluted columns, with decorative spiral ornament in the corner spandrels. The outer bays are topped by glass roundels. (Note: The clerestory windows are above the ceiling of the second retail story, within the outermost bays of the storefront. The ceiling of the main retail space extends to the top of the storefront.) Above the second floor is a cartouche with the words "Charles Scribners' Sons", above a garland flanked by putti. A sill runs above the storefront.

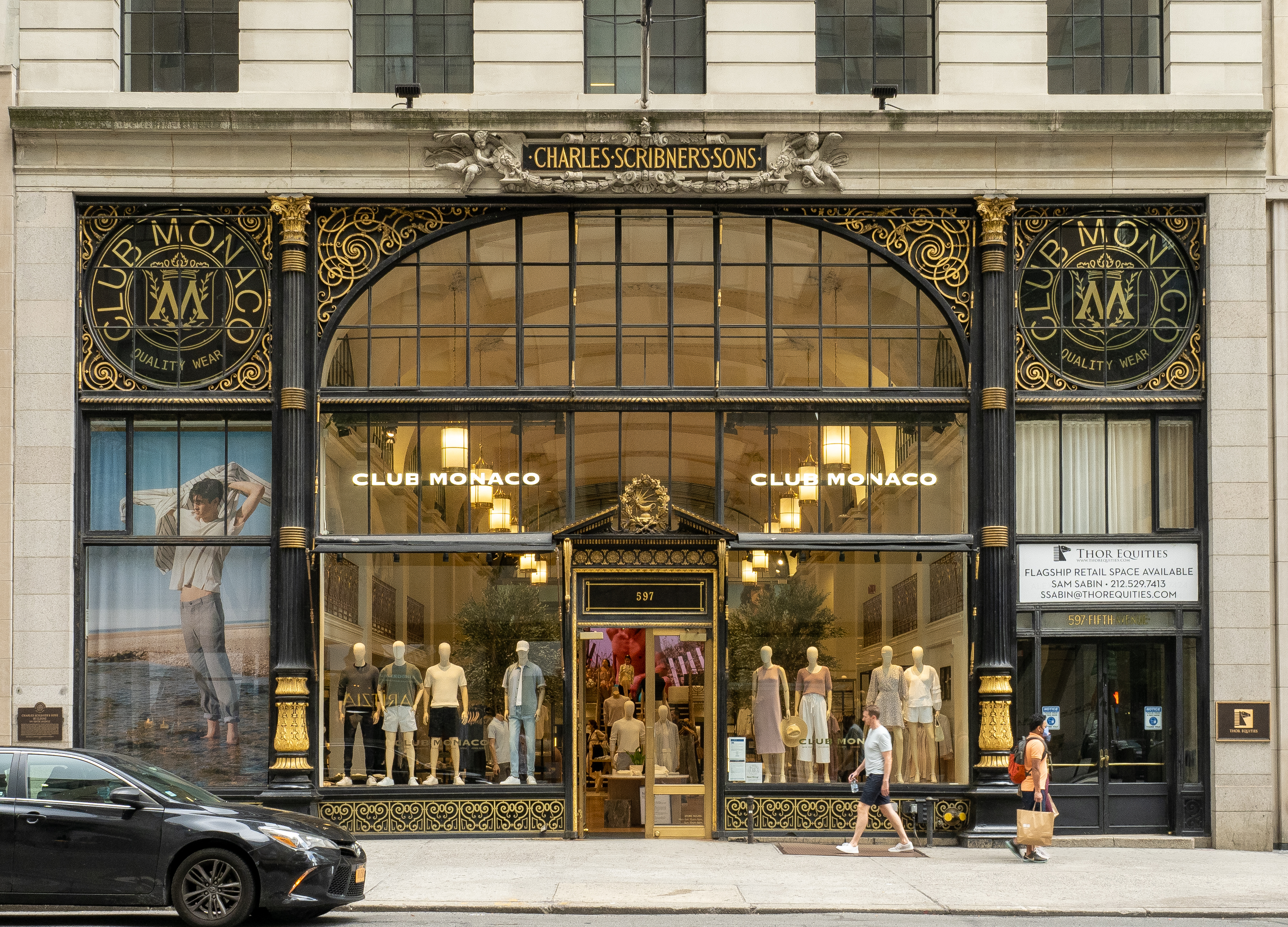
First- and second- story arch

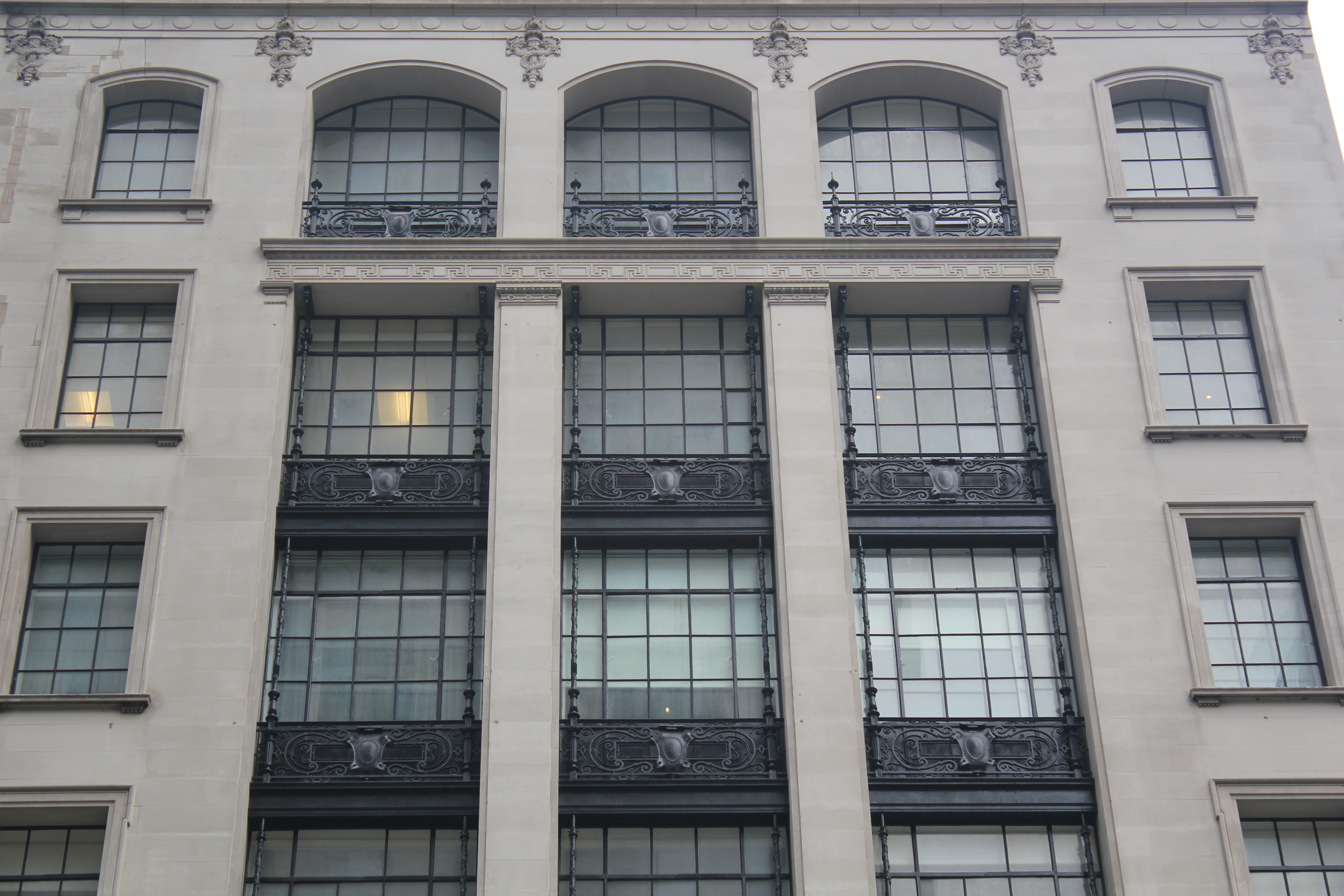
Detail of sixth through eighth stories

The third story is clad with rusticated blocks of limestone and has five rectangular casement windows. At the tops of the spaces between each window are brackets shaped like lions' heads. On the upper stories, the three center bays are flanked by vertical piers and are more ornate in design compared to the outer bays. The fourth story has a balcony in front of the three center bays, as well as windows topped by triangular pediments on the outer bays. The piers at the fourth story contain medallions with cartouches of the printers Benjamin Franklin, William Caxton, Johann Gutenberg, and Aldus Manutius.

On the fifth through seventh stories, the center bays are slightly recessed behind the piers, with carved iron spandrels separating the windows on each story. In the center bays, the seventh story is topped by an entablature, while the eighth story contains segmentally arched windows with ironwork railings at the bottom. The outer bays contain smaller windows with simple moldings, as well as window sills supported by guttae. The outermost windows on the fifth through seventh stories are rectangular and those on the eighth story are segmental arches. An entablature, which contains a frieze designed as a pellet molding, runs above the eighth story. There are decorative torch motifs beneath the entablature, at the tops of each pier.

The ninth-story windows are flanked by pilasters, of which the four center pilasters are fluted. The three center windows on this story are each designed as tripartite openings with two small colonettes. A cornice with console brackets runs above the ninth story, topped by a parapet and a copper-edged mansard roof. In the center bay above the cornice is a double-height dormer that projects from the roof. This dormer is flanked by caryatids and topped by a broken pediment containing a lion's-head motif and a cartouche. There are two double hung windows in the roof on either side of the dormer. The corners of the parapet have obelisk-shaped finials.

=== Interior ===
The building has a gross floor area of 52,727 square feet (4,898.5 m^{2}) according to the New York City Department of City Planning. However, according to The Real Deal magazine, there are 58,000 square feet (5,400 m^{2}) of office space and 12,000 square feet (1,100 m^{2}) of retail space. Each of the office floors has about 5,000 square feet (460 m^{2}) of usable area. As designed, the Scribner's bookstore was placed within what is now the ground-story and second-story retail space, and the business, editorial, and financial departments occupied four stories above. For Scribner's executive offices, Flagg designed some furniture such as bookshelves.

==== Retail space ====
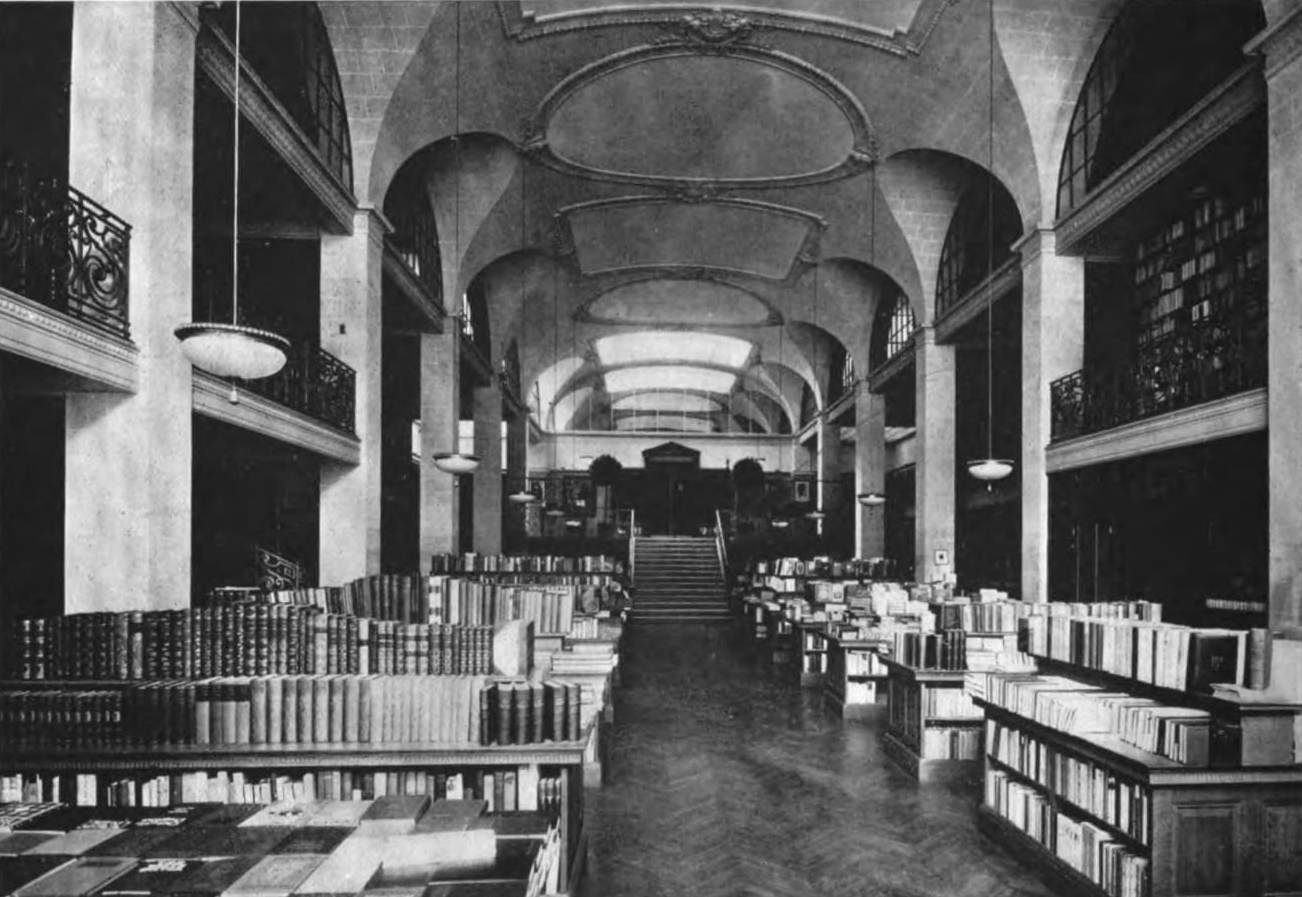
Original interior seen in 1913

The retail space is asymmetrical, but the design of the 155 Fifth Avenue store was emulated at 597 Fifth Avenue, in keeping with Scribner's preferences. It was once characterized by Henry-Russell Hitchcock as "the grandest, interior space that had been created in New York", akin to the interior of Grand Central Terminal. The retail space consists of a long nave-like room with a 30-foot-tall (9.1 m), ornately decorated vaulted ceiling. The ceiling vaults are supported by seven white rectangular pillars on each side. The grilles were originally painted with gold and bronze dust, despite the fact that original specifications had called for green decoration. The floor surface was made of herringbone and oak wood. The bookstore was designed with only one entrance, even though Flagg had wanted two. A lobby for the office stories is on the southern side of the ground floor.

At the eastern end of the ground-story retail space is a central staircase that leads up to a mezzanine display area. A mirrored surface at the mezzanine's eastern wall reflected the entire shop. From the mezzanine, staircases lead to two second-story balconies, one above the north wall and the other above the eastern section of the south wall. An additional balcony is on the western section of the south wall, above the office lobby, and is not connected to either of the other two. The southwestern balcony is accessed by a spiral staircase; a similar staircase originally existed to the northern balcony. All three balconies have decorative cast-iron railings, ornamental moldings, and plaster-paneled ceilings. The ceilings of the balconies are lower than the vaulted ceiling at the center of the room. Consequently, clerestory windows are placed at the top of the central vault's northern and southern walls. At the far eastern section of the retail space, beyond the end of the mansard roof, a skylight was installed.

== History ==
In 1846, Charles Scribner I and Isaac D. Baker formed publishing company Baker & Scribner, which Scribner renamed the "Charles Scribner Company" after Baker's death in 1857. The company was headquartered at several buildings in Lower Manhattan through the mid-19th century. The name of the company was changed to Charles Scribner's Sons in 1878, and the firm moved to 155 Fifth Avenue, near 22nd Street, in 1894. Flagg was hired for the 155 Fifth Avenue project because he was the brother-in-law of Charles Scribner II, the head of the Scribner's bookstore during the late 19th and early 20th centuries. At the beginning of the 20th century, development was centered on Fifth Avenue north of 34th Street. Scribner's was among the companies that decided to relocate further north in Manhattan. The Charles Scribner's Sons Building, along with the Gorham, Tiffany, Coty, and Demarest buildings, is among the few surviving stores that were erected for smaller retailers on Fifth Avenue during the early 20th century.

=== Scribner's usage ===
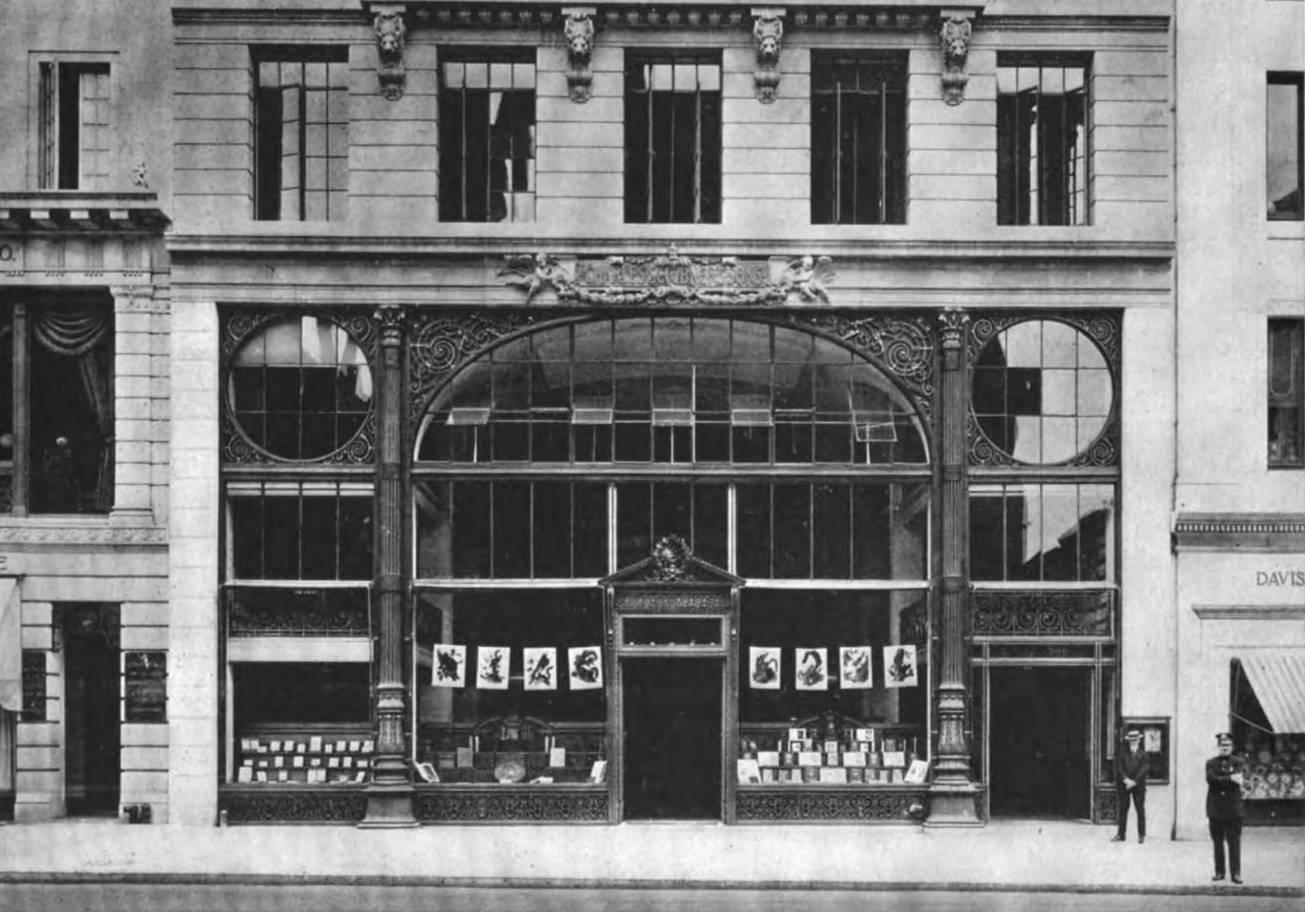
Storefront seen in 1913

By January 1911, Ernest Flagg had written in his diary that Charles Scribner II had discussed the possibility of constructing a new quarters along Fifth Avenue. In February 1912, Charles Scribner's Sons bought the houses at 597 and 599 Fifth Avenue, near 48th Street, from the estates of Sarah M. and Roswell P. Flower, with the intention of constructing a 10-story structure there for retail and offices. Scribner hired Flagg to construct the new building, and a steel contract was awarded in May. The foundations and excavations were nearly completed by the following month, when Flagg submitted building plans to the New York City Department of Buildings. The steelwork was being constructed by August 1912.

The building opened by May 18, 1913, and became the seventh headquarters of Charles Scribner's Sons. In addition to the bookstore and offices at 597 Fifth Avenue, Scribner's had a building at 311–319 West 43rd Street for its printing press. The development of the 597 Fifth Avenue building was described by architectural writer Robert A. M. Stern in 1983 as "sure testimony to the rapid march of commerce to upper Fifth Avenue". New York Times journalist David W. Dunlap, writing in 2012, said 597 Fifth Avenue was like "the Apple store of its day". At opening, the bookstore contained shelves of books arranged along both the ground floor and the balconies. Some retail offices were also placed below the mezzanine.

During much of the 20th century, the building contained a Scribner's bookstore and the offices of Scribner's publishers. Visitors included the authors F. Scott Fitzgerald, Ernest Hemingway, and Thomas Wolfe, who met with their editors on the upper stories, as well as Theodore Roosevelt, who was an early shopper. The editors working at the building included Maxwell Perkins, whose fifth-floor office was the site of a fight between Hemingway and Max Eastman over who had more chest hair. The Charles Scribner's Sons bookstore had a rare book vault, which was used to store items such as a manuscript of the Haffner Symphony by Mozart, one of two attested copies of George Washington's proclamation of Thanksgiving in 1789; and a collection of Adolf Hitler's books and papers. The bookstore sometimes held exhibitions, such as a display illustrating the manufacturing process of books, as well as an event where a copy of the Gutenberg Bible was displayed. Some of the upper stories were leased to tenants, such as a perfumer in 1960.

The New York City Landmarks Preservation Commission (LPC) was considering a landmark designation for the Charles Scribner's Sons Building in 1967, although a real estate expert testified that such a designation would reduce the building's value by up to $1 million. When the bookstore interior was renovated in 1974, the lighting was replaced and new shelves and counters were installed. By the 1980s, the store was described in The New York Times as "the last bastion of the Fifth Avenue old-school bookstore", with its specialty in hardcover books. The building was nominated for listing on the National Register of Historic Places in 1981 and was deemed to have met the architectural and historical criteria for acceptance. However, it was not listed because of objections from its owners. The following year, on March 23, 1982, the LPC designated 597 Fifth Avenue's exterior as a landmark. At a public hearing for the city-landmark designation, six speakers had supported the designation and four had opposed it.

=== Late 20th century ===
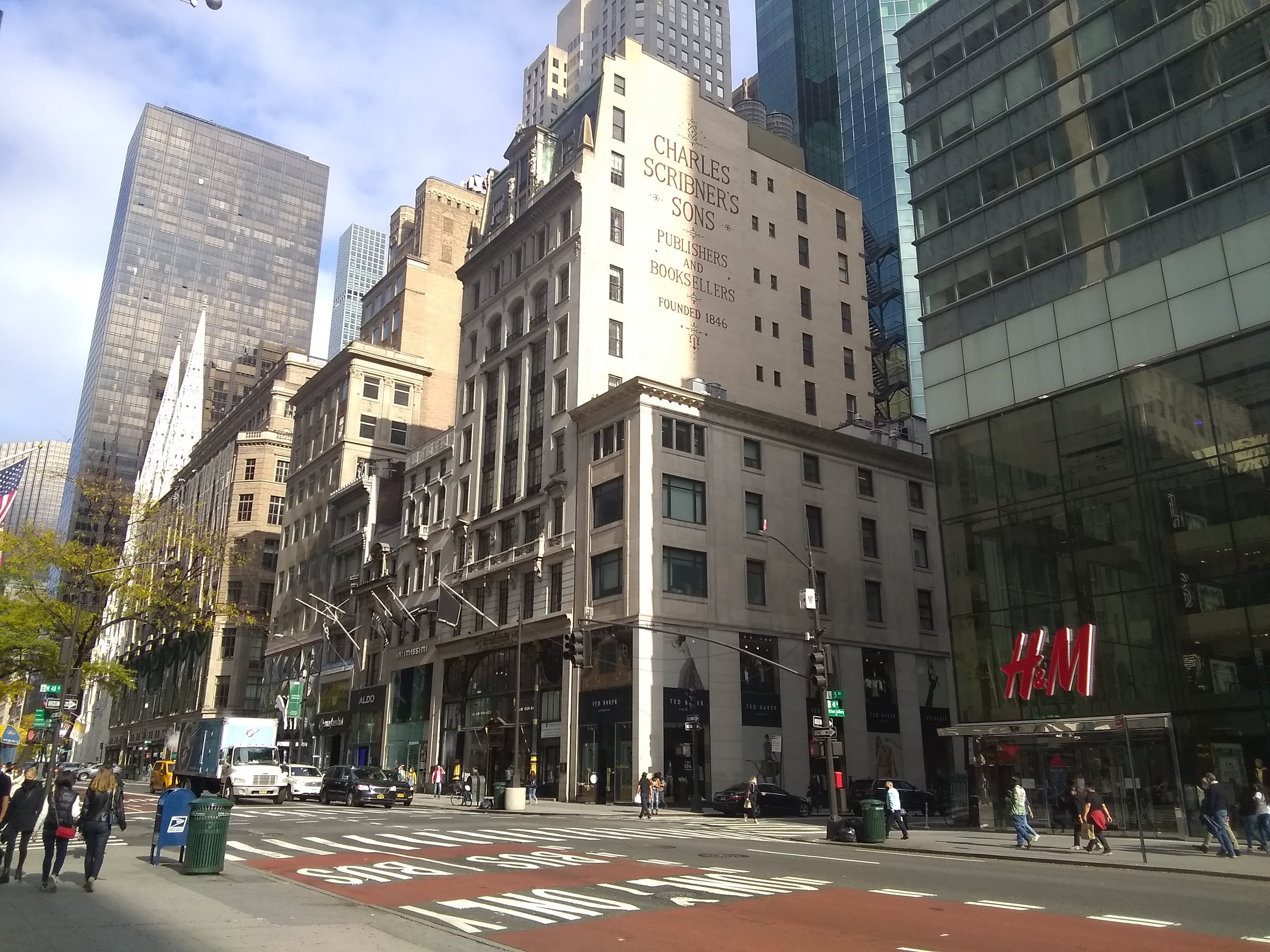
Viewed from Fifth Avenue near 47th Street

In 1984, Scribner's publishing division was acquired by Macmillan Inc. Rizzoli International Bookstores acquired Scribner's bookstores the same year and relocated to the two stories above the retail space. Scribner's executive vice president Charles Scribner III subsequently announced the same year that the building would be sold to the Cohen family, which ran the Duane Reade chain of drugstores. Scribner's sought to relocate from 597 Fifth Avenue, where it was no longer economically feasible to operate, and Rizzoli was also planning to move from its location at 712 Fifth Avenue. When Scribner's preferred location was found to be unavailable, the Scribner's bookstore remained in place, and Rizzoli leased the retail space and two floors of offices. The Cohen family planned to rent out the remaining 36,000 square feet (3,300 m^{2}) of office space in the building, although the office stories were small by modern standards. Ultimately, the Benetton Group purchased the building in June 1988 from Duane Reade.

By December 1988, Scribner's leadership announced the building's bookstore would close the next month because of the excessive costs of continuing to operate the store. The rent was projected to increase three hundred percent. At the time, the president of Rizzoli's American companies said the retail space, a "cathedral in honor of bookselling", was no longer efficient for commercial use. On the last day of the bookstore's operation, Leonard Riggio, executive chairman of B. Dalton and Barnes & Noble, intervened to try to keep the store open. Nevertheless, the bookstore location closed as scheduled. After B. Dalton acquired the Scribner's brand in May 1989, Riggio started negotiating with Benetton to discuss the possibility of reopening a bookstore branch in the building. Shortly after the Scribner's store closed, the LPC considered the store's interior for landmark status. Benetton executives, who were planning a renovation of the retail space, said they would not oppose such a designation; an attorney for the company said they were "used to landmarks". On July 11, 1989, the LPC designated the building as an interior landmark. Although there were indications Benetton would lease the space as a Waterstones bookstore, the space was instead leased to a Brentano's bookstore in September 1989. The Brentano's store opened two months later.

Brentano's announced its intention to vacate the store in 1994 and ultimately closed on January 19, 1996. After Brentano's departure, Benetton hired Phillips Janson Group to conduct interior restorations for several million dollars. Restoration architect Dennis Janson took two months to research the building's history, while decorative art firm Terra Firma was hired to look at paint samples to determine the original color. Most of the project was dedicated to restoring old design elements, including adding a spiral staircase that had been removed. The restoration uncovered several decorative elements that had previously been hidden, including the rear skylight and glass planks. Monica Geran of Interior Design magazine called the reopening of the skylight a "crowning glory" of the renovation. Benetton opened its 13,000-square-foot (1,200 m^{2}) United States flagship store in the space in November 1996. Rizzoli operated a pop-up bookstore with 300 titles as part of an agreement with Benetton. A cafe was also opened on the lower story of the retail space. Meanwhile, to attract office tenants, Benetton gave free Prince tennis bags to brokers who successfully leased space in the building.

=== 21st century ===
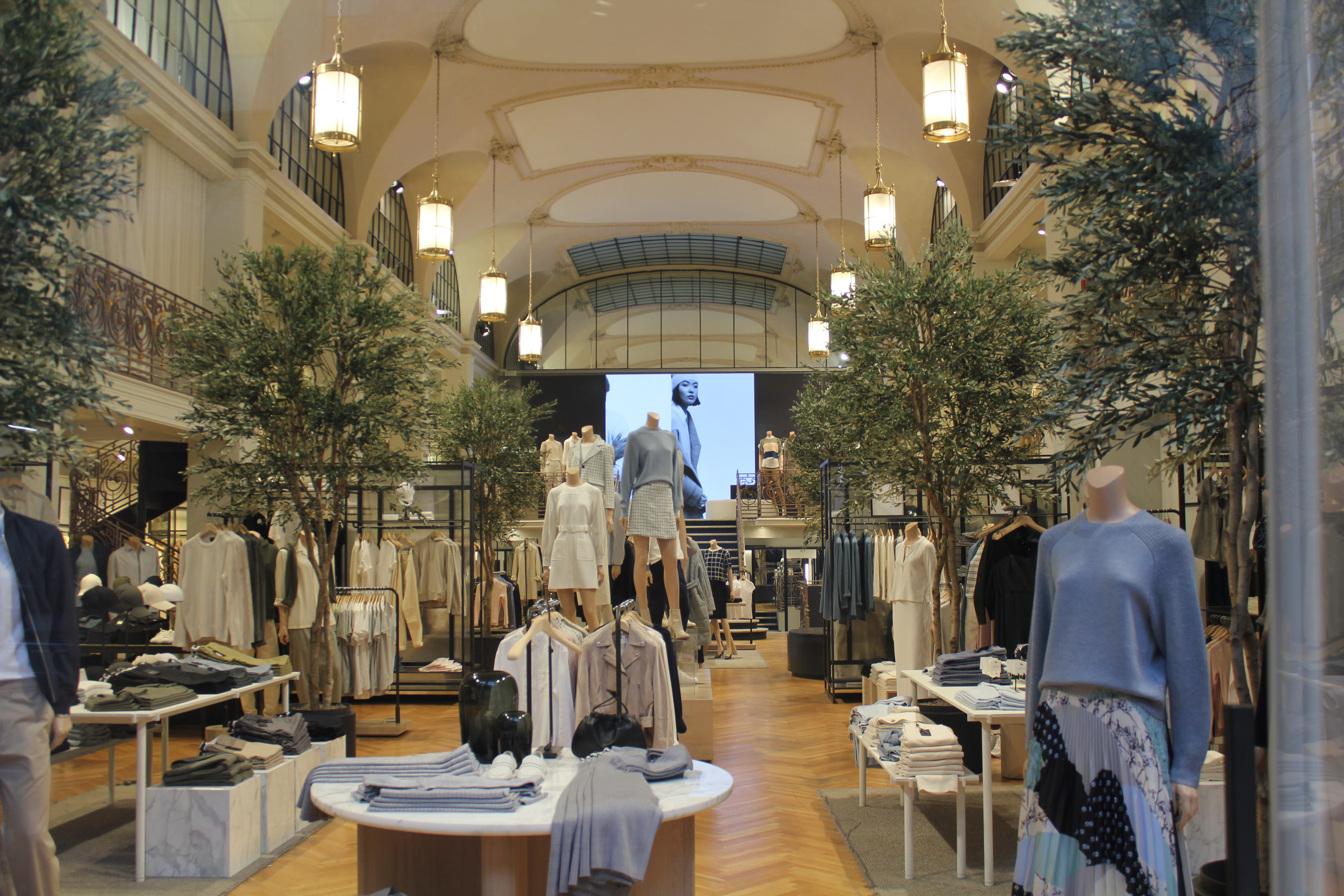
View into the building's Club Monaco

Cosmetics store Sephora signed a ten-year lease for the ground-level retail space in 2004. A&A Investment Co. bought 597 Fifth Avenue in 2006 for $79.1 million, and it was resold to Thor Equities in 2011 for $108.5 million. Thor refinanced the building in 2014, receiving a $105 million loan for 597 Fifth Avenue and the neighboring 3 East 48th Street from UBS Group AG. Oxford Properties placed a mezzanine loan of $10 million on the building, which was senior to another mezzanine loan of $25 million from by SL Green Realty. During this time, 597 Fifth Avenue contained several office tenants as well. During the city's 2013 mayoral election, Anthony Weiner opened a campaign office on the upper stories of 597 Fifth Avenue. Cambridge Analytica, a British political consulting firm, had its New York office at 597 Fifth Avenue between 2016 and the company's collapse in 2018.

Sephora vacated the commercial space in the base in early 2017. Shortly afterward, in May 2017, Lululemon Athletica signed a short-term lease for the retail space. In February 2019, less than two years after its lease was signed, Lululemon decided to relocate across the street. Thor was at risk of having to forfeit 597 Fifth Avenue to SL Green unless it could secure a luxury retail tenant. Coworking space Knotel signed a lease for 6,400 square feet (590 m^{2}) in May 2019, and Club Monaco signed a lease for the retail space that November. The onset of the COVID-19 pandemic in New York City in 2020 caused a sharp decline in Thor's business. Although the building's mortgage was restructured in May 2020, the company was delinquent on two months' worth of loan payments on 597 Fifth Avenue during mid-2020. This placed the building in danger of "imminent payment default" by November 2020, and after Thor defaulted on its loan, SL Green took over as the property manager in 2021.

Club Monaco paid only $285 per square foot ($3,070/m^{2}) in rent by 2022; at the time, market rate rents on Fifth Avenue averaged $2,000 per square foot ($22,000/m^{2}). LNR Partners initiated pre-foreclosure proceedings against 597 Fifth Avenue and 3 East 48th Street in early 2023, requesting that a court auction off both structures. The buildings went into receivership during the middle of that year, and the receiver claimed that Thor had abandoned the building. At the time, 597 Fifth Avenue was only 25% occupied, its facade was crumbling, and its fire-suppression system needed at least $1 million in repairs. 597 Fifth Avenue and 3 East 48th Street were valued at $84 million, less than half the $180 million valuation they had a decade earlier. Club Monaco, the building's only remaining tenant, renewed its lease for seven years in May 2024, and a state judge approved a foreclosure sale of 597 Fifth Avenue and 3 East 48th Street that August. JLL, the court-appointed property manager, alleged in December 2024 that the roof was leaking, making it difficult to lease out the upper floors. However, the special servicer for the building's loan, LNR Partners, allegedly refused to pay for the repairs. Subsequently, the building was sold to the mortgage lender for $140.4 million in April 2025.

== See also ==
- List of New York City Designated Landmarks in Manhattan from 14th to 59th Streets
