= Scribner House =

Scribner House may refer to:

- Scribner House (New Albany, Indiana), listed on the National Register of Historic Places (NRHP)
- Scribner House (Cornwall, New York), listed on the NRHP
