= Scribner Building =

Commercial building in Manhattan, New York

- U.S. National Register of Historic Places
- New York State Register of Historic Places
- New York City Landmark
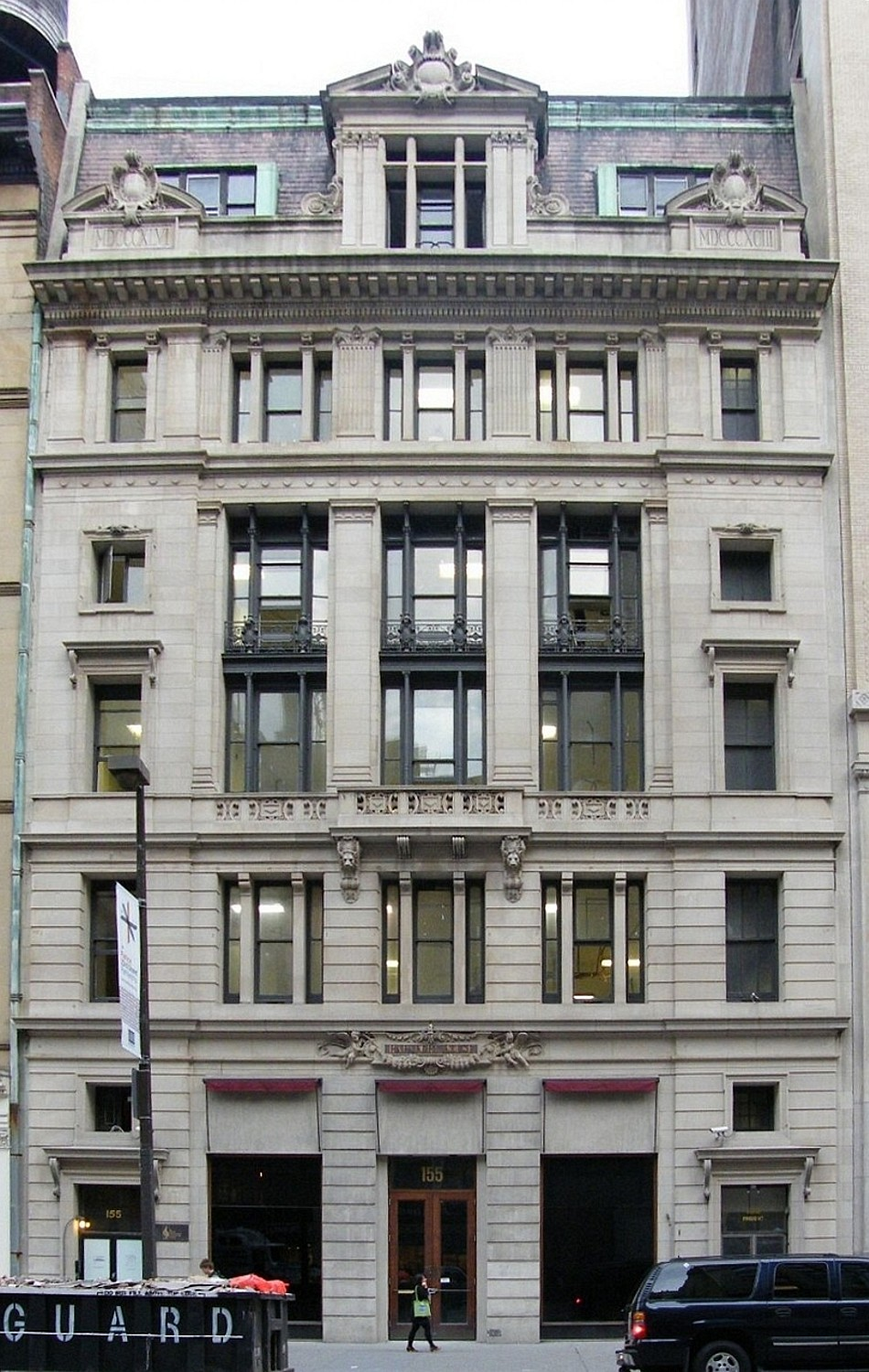
- The building's exterior in 2008
- Location: 153-157 5th Ave., Manhattan, New York
- Coordinates: 40°44′26″N 73°59′24″W
- Built: 1893
- Architect: Ernest Flagg
- Architectural style: Beaux Arts
- NRHP reference No.: 80002715
- NYSRHP No.: 06101.000647
- NYCL No.: 0935

Significant dates
- Added to NRHP: May 6, 1980
- Designated NYSRHP: June 23, 1980
- Designated NYCL: September 14, 1976

The Scribner Building (also known as the Old Scribner Building) is a commercial structure at 155 Fifth Avenue, near 21st Street, in the Flatiron District of Manhattan in New York City, United States. Designed by Ernest Flagg in the Beaux Arts style, it was completed in 1893 as the corporate headquarters of Charles Scribner's Sons publishing company.

The Fifth Avenue facade contains a base of rusticated limestone blocks on its lowest two stories. On the third through fifth stories, the facade is subdivided into five limestone bays, while at the sixth story is a mansard roof. Among the facade's details are vertical piers at the center of the facade. At ground level is a retail space that was originally used as Scribner's bookstore. The upper stories originally contained the offices of Charles Scribner's Sons and were subsequently converted into standard office space.

Charles Scribner's Sons was founded in 1846 as Baker & Scribner, which occupied several buildings before moving to 155 Fifth Avenue. The company used the Old Scribner Building until 1913, when the firm moved to 597 Fifth Avenue, a structure also designed by Flagg. The family continued to hold the building until 1951, leasing it as office space. The Old Scribner Building was used as the headquarters of the United Synagogue of America from 1973 to 2007. The building was designated a city landmark by the New York City Landmarks Preservation Commission (LPC) in 1976 and was added to the National Register of Historic Places (NRHP) in 1980. It is a contributing property to the Ladies' Mile Historic District, which was designated by the LPC in 1989.

== Site ==
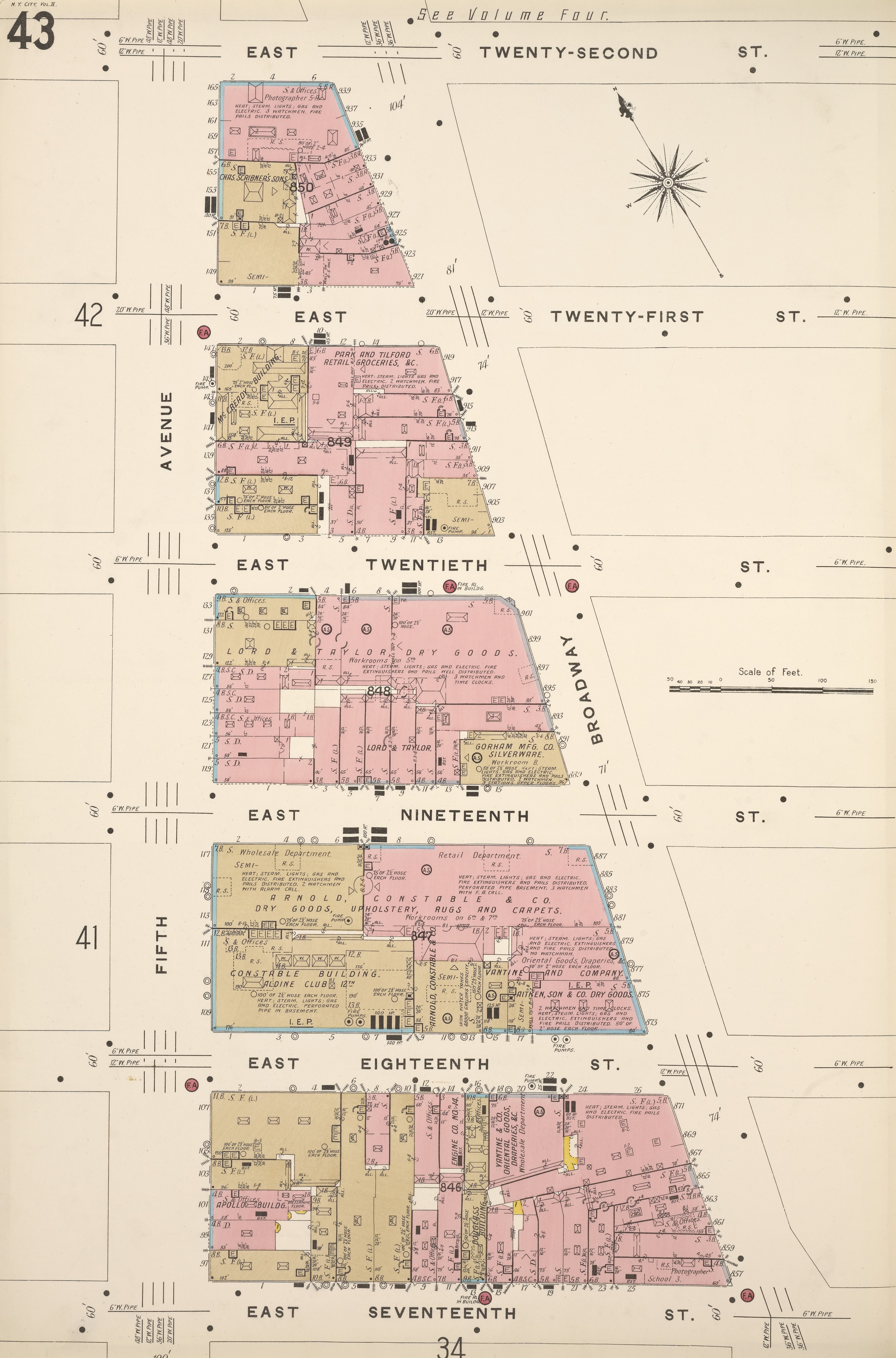
Site map, 1903

The Old Scribner Building is at 155 Fifth Avenue in the Flatiron District neighborhood of Manhattan in New York City, United States. It sits on the eastern side of the avenue between 22nd Street to the north and 21st Street to the south. The building spans the addresses 153–157 Fifth Avenue. The trapezoidal land lot covers 4,825 square feet (448.3 m^{2}), with a frontage of 59.25 feet (18.06 m) on Fifth Avenue and a depth of 87.58 feet (26.69 m). Nearby buildings include the Flatiron Building and 935–939 Broadway to the north, as well as the Sohmer Piano Building to the west.

The surrounding stretch of Fifth Avenue was developed with residences in the 1840s, which were demolished to make way for commercial and office uses by the late 19th century. The Scribner Building is one of several late-19th century office structures developed in the neighborhood. Just prior to the Old Scribner Building's construction, the lots at 153–155 Fifth Avenue may have been occupied by the Glenham Hotel. However, city records show that the hotel could have been on the adjoining lot to the south.

== Architecture ==
The Old Scribner Building was designed by Ernest Flagg in the Beaux Arts style for the company Charles Scribner's Sons. It has a gross floor area of 37,288 square feet (3,464.2 m^{2}). The building is similar in appearance to the successor Scribner's bookstore at 597 Fifth Avenue, which Flagg also designed. Both structures have symmetrical limestone facades divided horizontally into multiple sections. The Old Scribner Building's superstructure consists of a steel frame with brick infill. The main contractor was Charles T. Wills.

Upon the completion of the building, Scribner's Magazine said its headquarters had a "dignified and striking facade". According to Scribner's Magazine, the building was "the first in America built from ground to top distinctly for the uses of a publishing house". The design was praised by the architectural critic Francis Swales as being "one of the earliest" small stores in New York City to "possess any architectural merit".

=== Facade ===
Ground floor of the Scribner Building

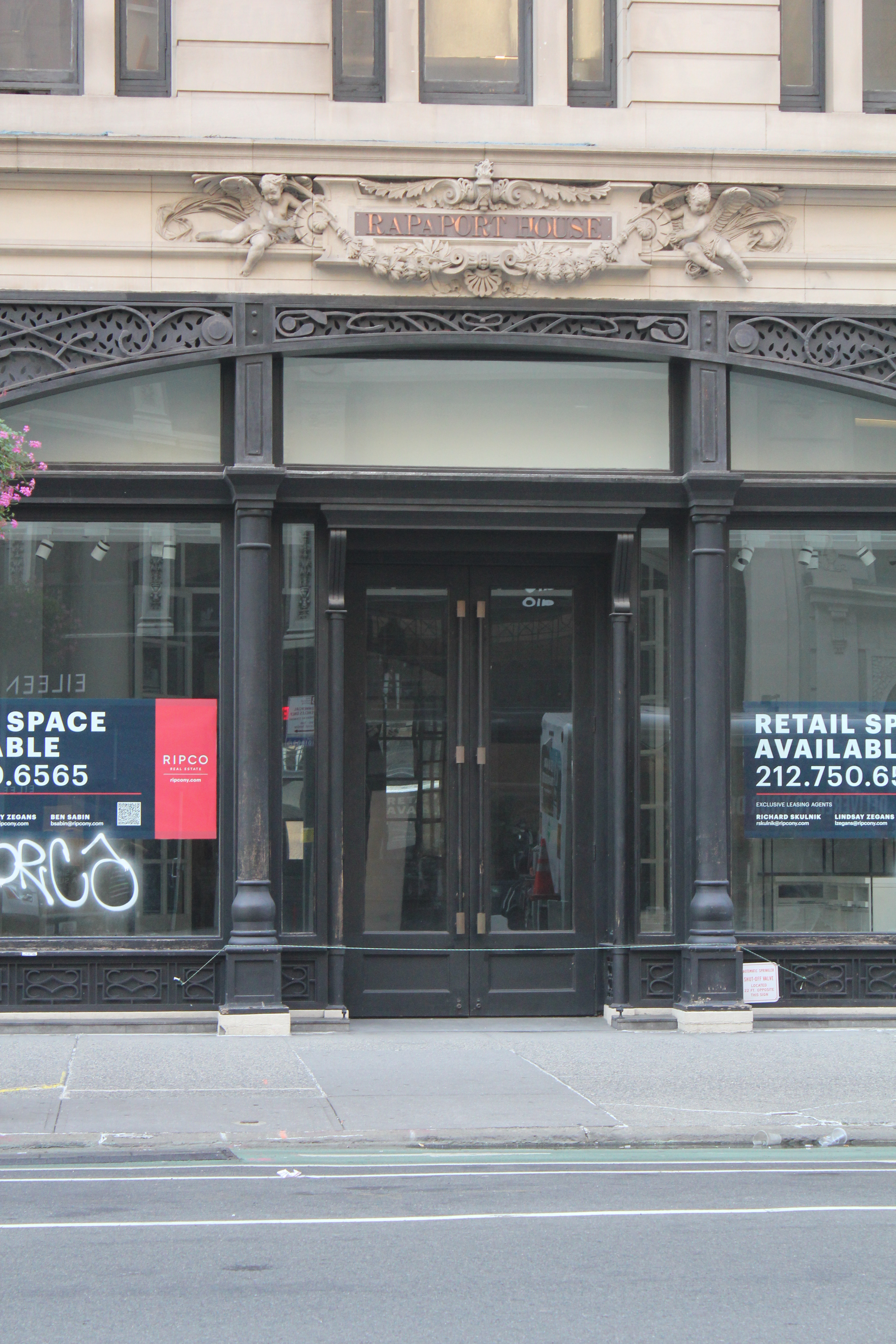
Main entrance

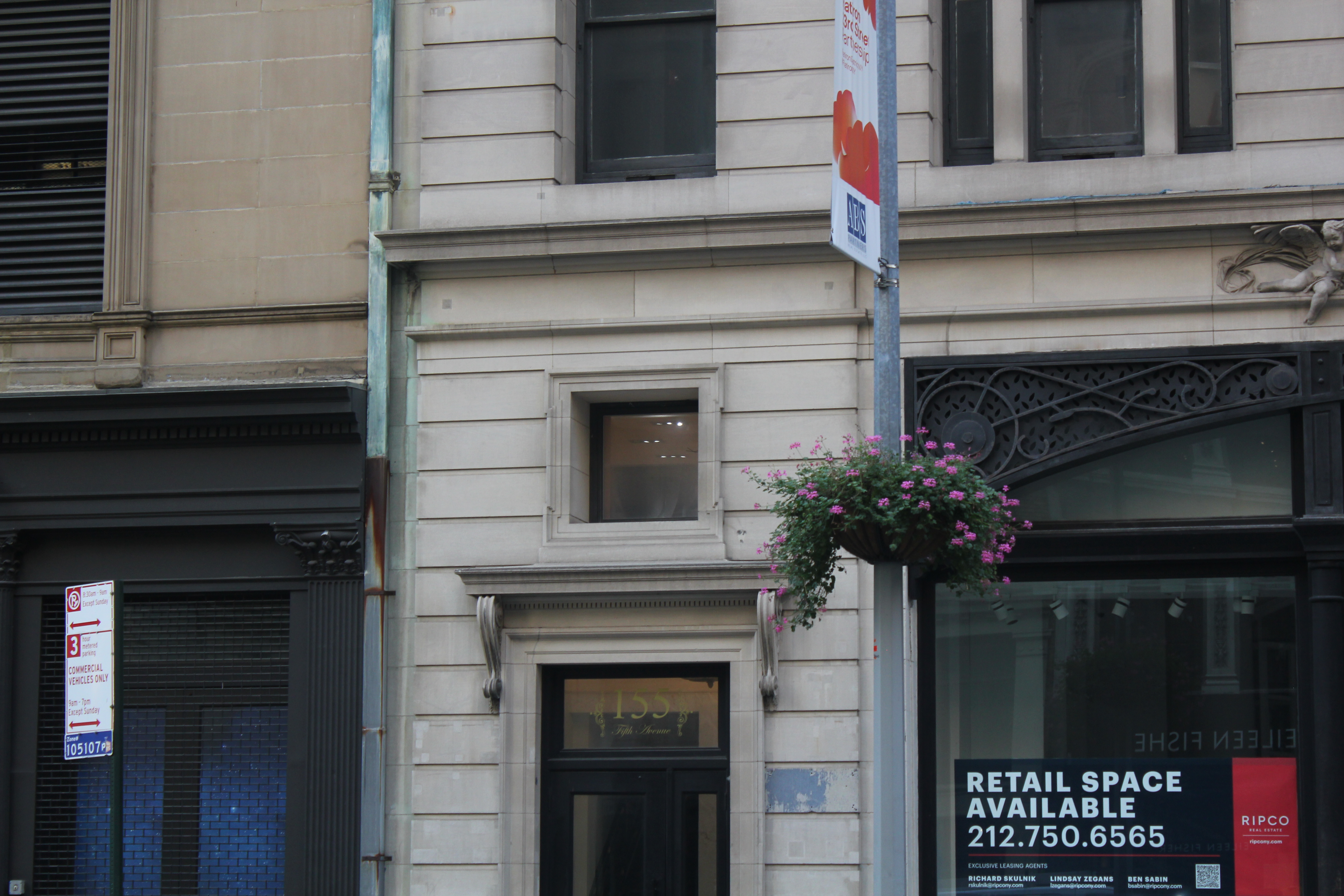
Side entrance

The facade is horizontally separated into three sections—the ground-story base, the second through fifth stories, and the sixth-story roof—each subdivided into five vertical bays. The facade uses rusticated blocks of limestone at the base, contrasted with plain limestone on the upper stories, to resemble a load-bearing wall. The ground or first story was designed with large central openings flanked by smaller doorways. It is clad with rusticated limestone blocks and has an arched glass-and-iron storefront in the three center bays. The arch was intended to give the impression of a truss supporting the stories above. Above the center of the first floor is a cartouche with the capital letters "Charles Scribner's Sons", above a garland flanked by putti. There are rectangular doorways on either side of the storefront. Above each doorway is an entablature as well as cornice supported on brackets. Originally, a curved glass marquee projected from the storefront.

The windows on the second through fifth stories are the same size as each other. The second story is clad with rusticated limestone blocks, similarly to the first story, with a stone band course at the top. The three center windows are designed as tripartite openings with two small colonettes, one on each side. Above the central second-story window are brackets shaped like lions' heads, which support a slightly protruding balcony at the central third-story window. The third and fourth stories are treated as a single large opening. At these stories, the three center bays are separated by vertical pilasters and flanked by half-pilasters. The inner bays are slightly recessed behind the pilasters, with carved iron spandrels separating the windows between either story. The outer bays are slightly projected from the inner bays and are more simple in design, with cornices above the third-story outer windows. An entablature with a pellet molding runs atop the fourth story. At the fifth floor, the three center windows are all tripartite openings with colonettes, while the two outer windows each contain one pane and are flanked by broad pilasters. The fifth story is designed to appear like a deep frieze.

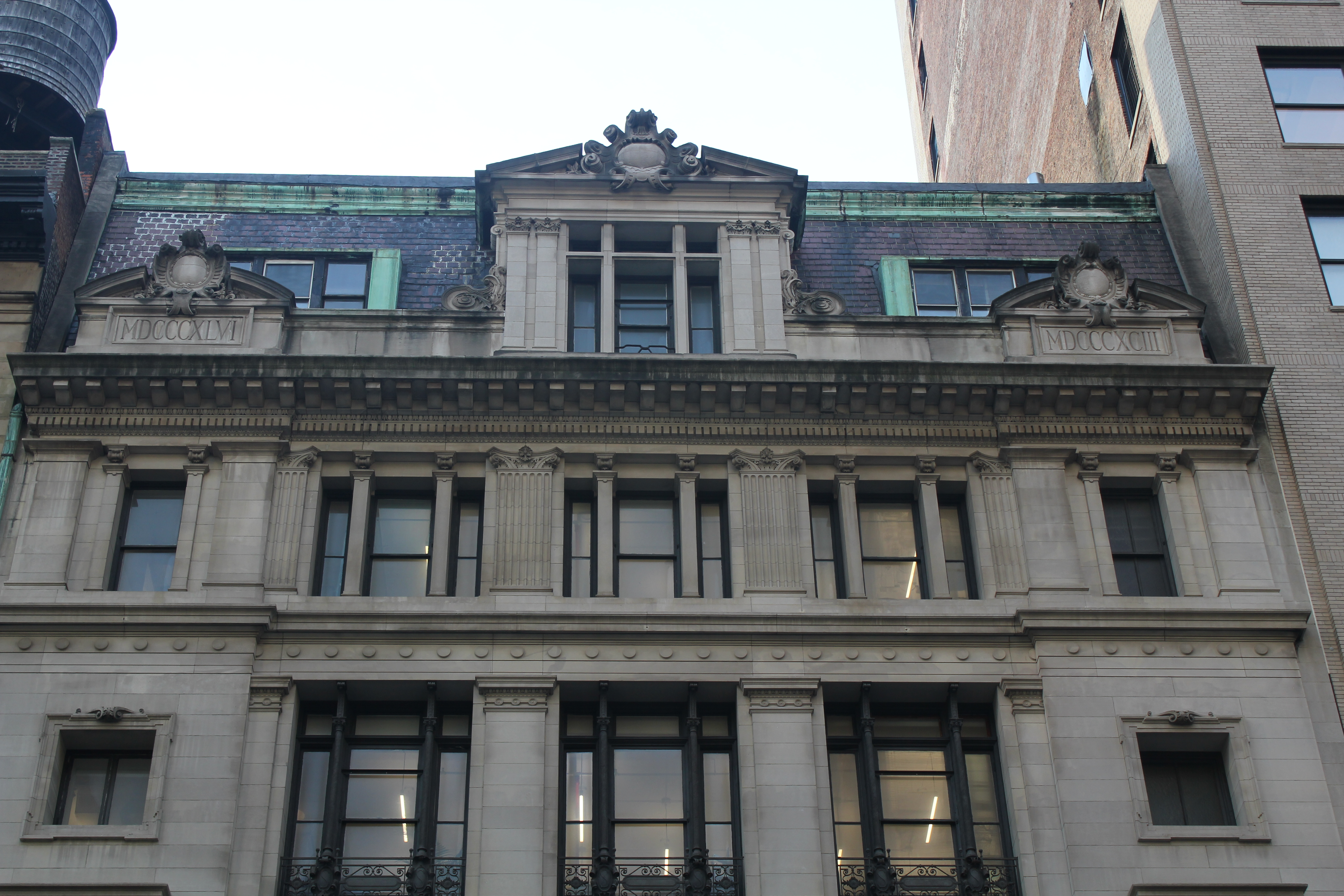
Fourth through sixth stories

A cornice with closely spaced console brackets runs above the fifth story, topped by a parapet and a slate mansard roof. At the sixth story, the outermost bays have curved broken pediments containing cartouches, below which are inscriptions with dates in Roman numerals. The inscription above the left bay is MDCCCXLVI (1846), the date when Scribner's was founded as Baker & Scribner, while the inscription above the right bay is MDCCCXCIII (1893), the date of the Old Scribner Building's completion. In the center bay above the cornice is a double-height dormer that projects from the roof. This dormer contains a tripartite window, with a horizontal transom bar near the top, and is topped by a pediment containing a cartouche. There are skylight windows in the roof on either side of the dormer.

=== Interior ===
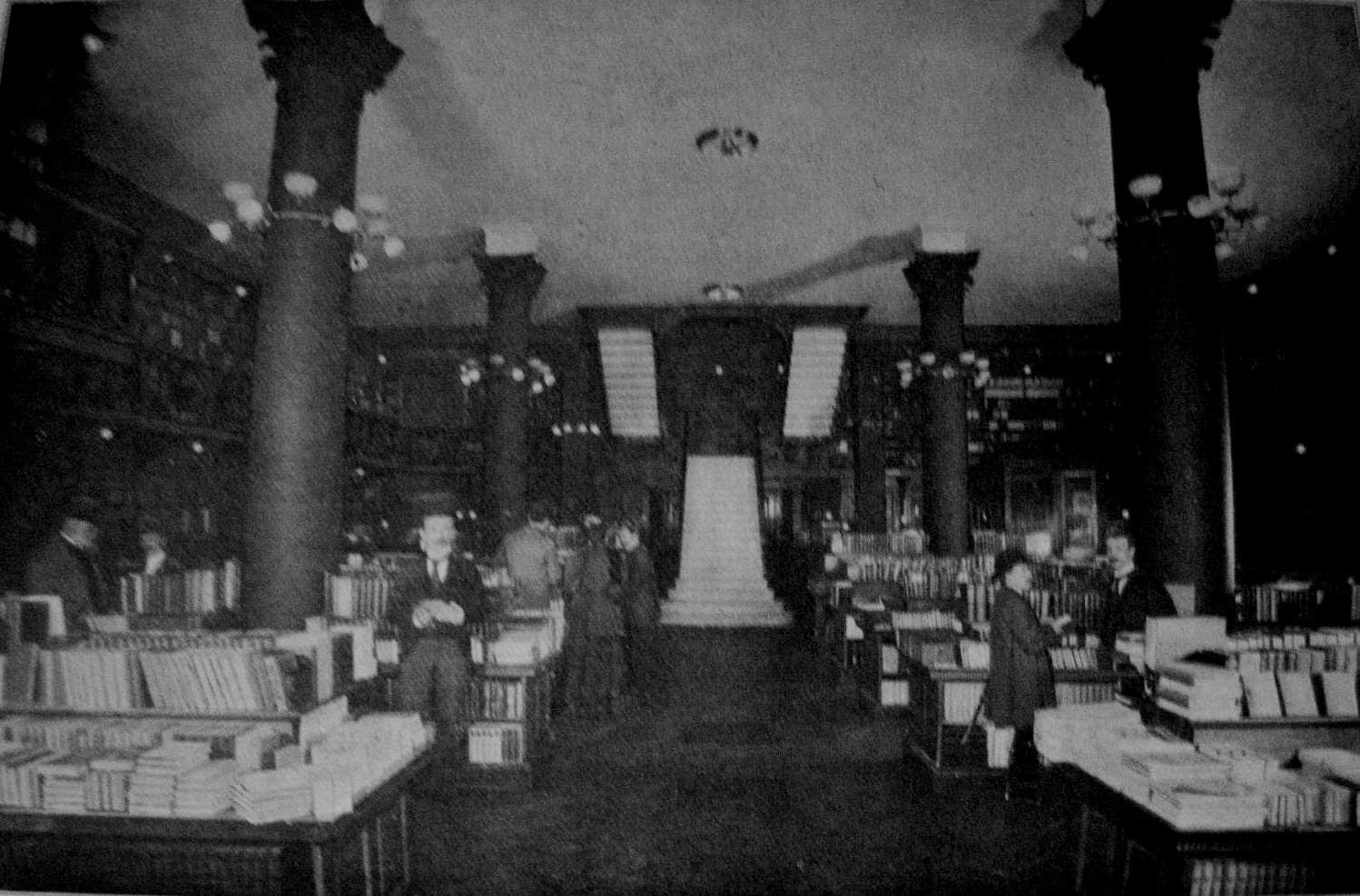
Original interior seen in 1895

The retail space on the ground story was originally the Scribner's bookstore. Upon the building's completion, the bookstore was described in Scribner's Magazine as resembling a "particularly well-cared-for library in some great private house, or in some of the quieter public institutions". The ground-story walls were clad in oak, and full-height bookcases with glass shelves were placed in front of each wall. These glass shelves were custom-made in France and were used because they were more clean-looking and sturdier than wood. The center of the room had oak tables with book displays. The wooden floor was laid on asphalt blocks and the ceiling was supported by high columns with Corinthian-style capitals. There was also a marble staircase at the rear of the store, with decorative iron railings containing "C" and "S" motifs. The stair led to a gallery that surrounded the room on all sides except the west. Also at the rear of the store, but at ground level, was a set of offices. The building retained its retail use after Scribner's moved out during 1913.

Two stairs led from the gallery to the second floor, one on either side of the stair from ground to gallery. Additional office entrances are in the side bays of the facade. The second floor originally contained Scribner's operating departments, such as the financial and manufacturing, wholesale, educational, and book-buyers' departments. The third floor was occupied by the departments of Scribner's Magazine such as the editorial, artistic, and publishing departments. The fourth floor contained the subscription department, while the fifth floor had storerooms. The sixth story included mail rooms, circular-printing equipment, as well as what Scribner's Magazine called "the other miscellany of a great business".

== History ==
In 1846, Charles Scribner I and Isaac D. Baker formed publishing company Baker & Scribner, which Scribner renamed the "Charles Scribner Company" after Baker's death in 1857. The company was headquartered at several buildings in Lower Manhattan through the mid-19th century. The name of the company was changed to Charles Scribner's Sons in 1878. In subsequent years, the company published works such as Scribner's Magazine, Baedeker Guides, the Dictionary of American Biography. In addition, Charles Scribner's Sons published books for various authors. The Glenham Hotel opened on September 17, 1869.

=== Scribner's usage ===
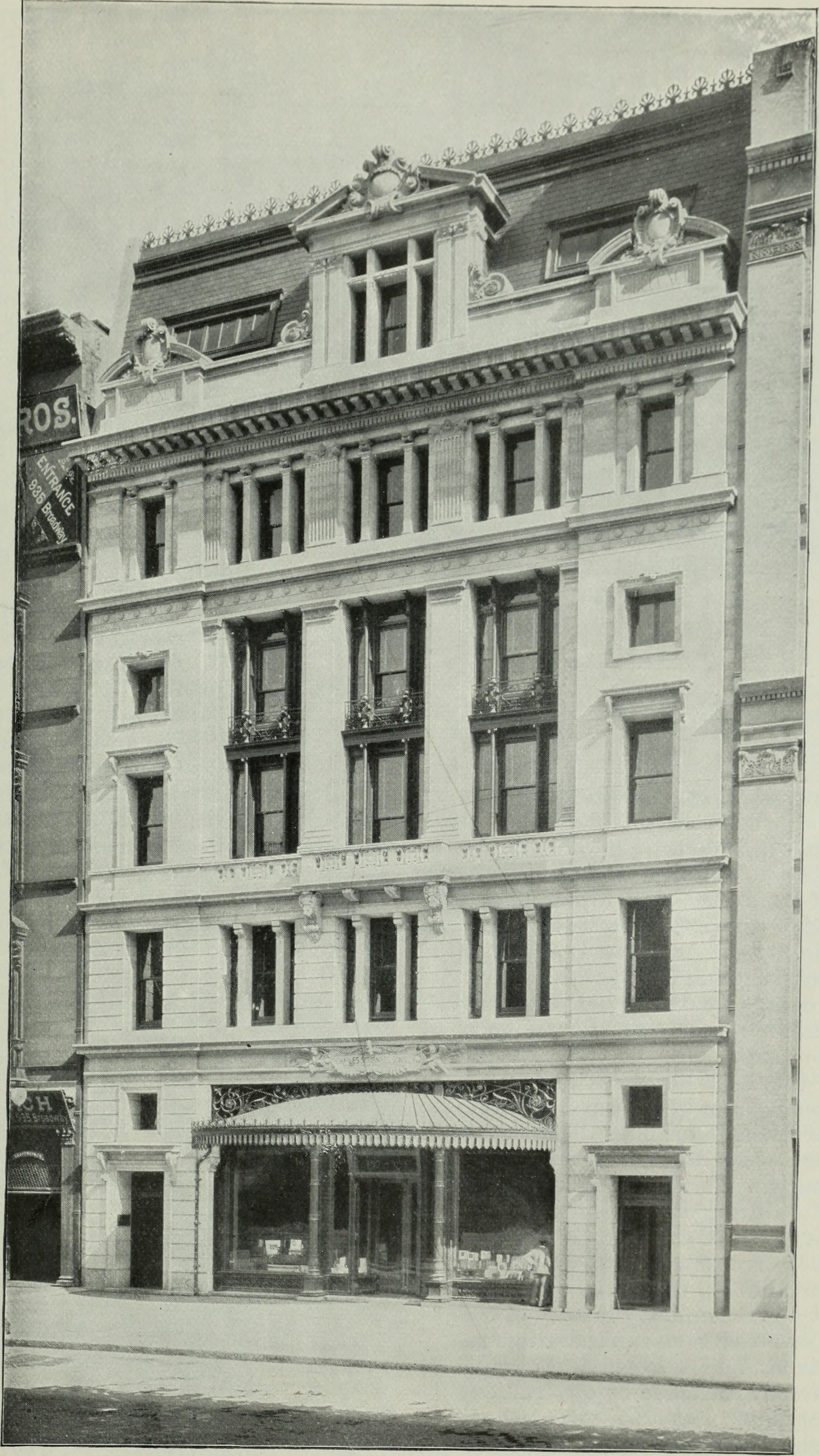
Early view of the exterior

In October 1893, Charles Scribner's Sons were reported as the buyers of the Glenham Hotel at 153 and 155 Fifth Avenue in the Flatiron District. Charles Scribner II, the head of Charles Scribner's Sons during the late 19th and early 20th centuries, hired his brother-in-law Ernest Flagg to design the new building. Plans were filed with the New York City Department of Buildings that December. The Scribner's bookstore relocated to the new building from its previous location on 745 Broadway during May 1894. Over 300,000 books, manuscripts, letters, and accounts were moved within one month; according to The New York Times, "not one was even imperceptibly damaged". The project cost $150,000 (equivalent to $4,986,000 in 2025). That December, Scribner transferred the leasehold to the Union Trust Company.

Upon the building's completion, a New York Times reporter described the bookstore as having a wide collection of items, including rare volumes and documents. The space was described as having the "appearance of a large public library", with a skylight in the rear illuminating the whole store. Additionally, the Scribner Building hosted several events and exhibitions. For instance, in November 1894, the building had a bookbinding exhibition "under the gracefully-shaped architectural marquise of which it is delightful to pass in", as it was described by The New York Times. The following year, the bookstore displayed some Robert Louis Stevenson memorabilia. These events continued through the first decade of the 20th century. In 1908, the store exhibited a series of rare documents, books, manuscripts, and autographs, including several centuries of papal and French royal documents.

By the beginning of the 20th century, development was centered on Fifth Avenue north of 34th Street. Scribner's was among the companies that decided to relocate further north in Manhattan. By January 1911, Ernest Flagg had written in his diary that Charles Scribner II had discussed the possibility of constructing a new quarters along Fifth Avenue. The new structure at 597 Fifth Avenue, near 48th Street, opened by May 18, 1913, thus becoming the seventh headquarters of Charles Scribner's Sons. The development of the 597 Fifth Avenue building was described by architectural writer Robert A. M. Stern as "sure testimony to the rapid march of commerce to upper Fifth Avenue".

=== Other occupancy ===
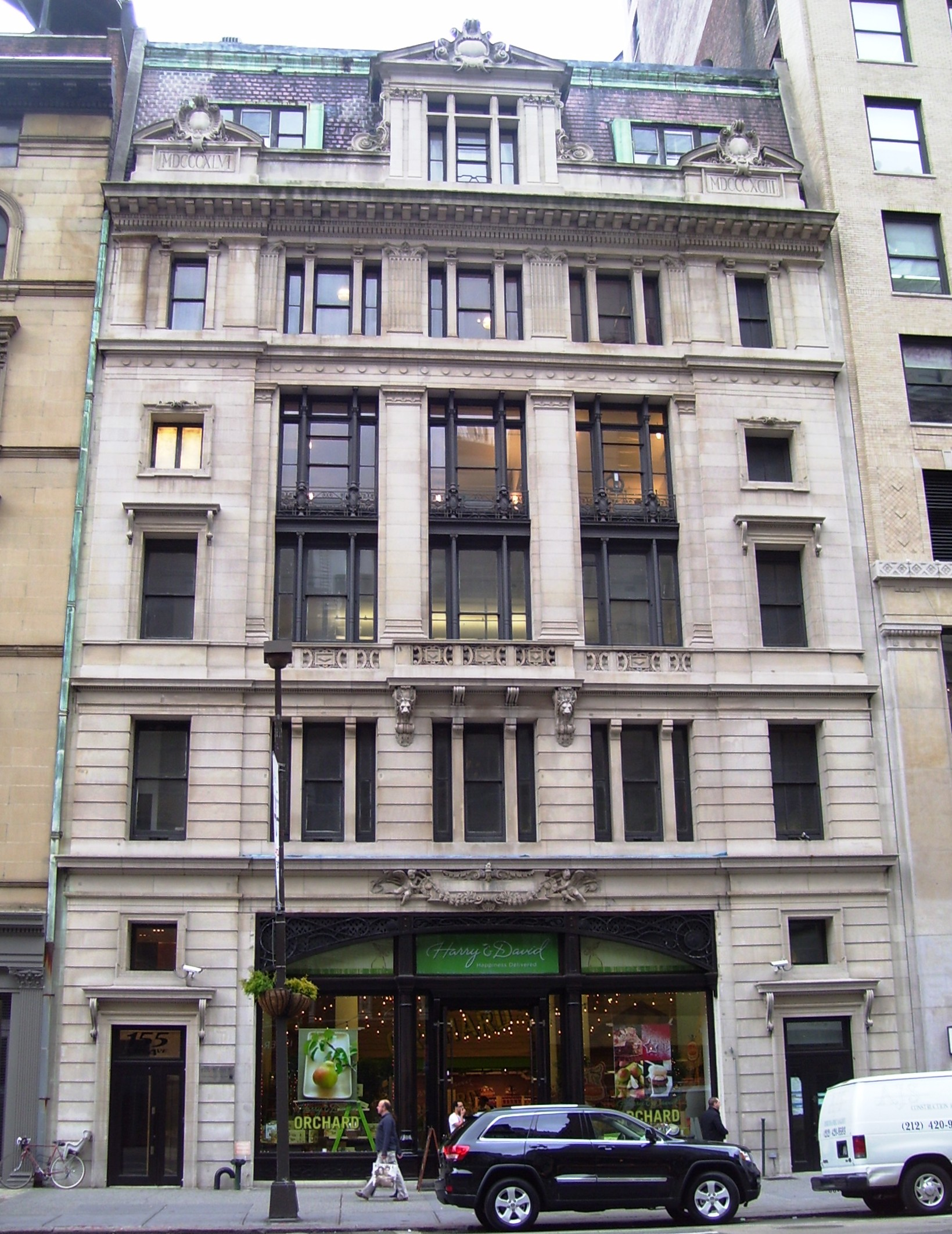
The facade as seen in 2010

Following their relocation, Charles Scribner's Sons continued to hold the old building, leasing it in October 1913 to glass importers D. Bloch & Company. D. Bloch moved to the building soon afterward, in what local media described as one of several signs of the surrounding neighborhood's mercantile redevelopment. In 1920, some space was leased to Bardival Brothers, a lace and embroidery merchant.

In 1934, the 153 Fifth Avenue Corporation leased the building for twenty-one years. The company was to refurbish the building for $40,000, adding retail on the first story and lofts on the other stories. The renovations were designed by the Scribners' architect Louis E. Jallade along with the tenants' architect Arthur Weiser. Among the modifications were the installation of new storefront windows. Brown, Wheelock, Harris & Co. were named as the leasing agents for 153 Fifth Avenue's office space the same year. Some space was taken by Alliance Distributors, which renovated its offices on the third and fourth floors in 1937 to plans by F.P. Platt & Brother. Blond wood barriers were installed at the ground floor, just inside the entrance, sometime in the 1940s or 1950s. The Scribner family continued to own the building until 1951. The following December, the building was transferred from the 153 Fifth Avenue Corporation to Harry C. Kaufman.

The storefront was renovated in 1969, upon which the storefront's glass marquee was removed. The United Synagogue of America (later United Synagogue of Conservative Judaism), an alliance of Conservative Jewish synagogues, acquired the building in 1973. The Old Scribner Building became the United Synagogue's headquarters and was named Rapaport House. The New York City Landmarks Preservation Commission (LPC) designated the Old Scribner Building as a city landmark on September 15, 1976, and the building was added to the National Register of Historic Places on May 6, 1980. The LPC further designated the Old Scribner Building as part of the Ladies' Mile Historic District, a city landmark district created in 1989. There were few vestiges of the Scribner company remaining on the facade by the 1990s.

The United Synagogue sold the building in 2007 for $26.5 million to Philips International Holding. The new owner sought to market the space toward a fashion tenant. However, the building was resold the following year to the Eretz Group for $38 million. During the 2010s, tenants of the Old Scribner Building included a showroom and office for clothing designer Rachel Zoe, a store for The White Company, and coworking space Knotel.

== See also ==
- List of New York City Designated Landmarks in Manhattan from 14th to 59th Streets
- National Register of Historic Places listings in Manhattan from 14th to 59th Streets
