= Rachel Lyon (novelist) =

American novelist

Rachel Lyon is an American novelist. Her first novel, Self-Portrait with Boy, was longlisted for the 2018 Center for Fiction First Novel Prize.

== Life ==
She attended Saint Ann's School, Princeton University, and Indiana University Bloomington, and has taught at the Sackett Street Writers’ Workshop and Bennington College.

She was an editor at Epiphany magazine from 2020-2022.

== Works ==
- Self-Portrait with Boy, Scribner, 2018. ISBN 978-1501169588
- Fruit of the Dead, Scribner, 2024. ISBN 978-1668020852
