= Charles Scribner IV =

American publisher (1921–1995)

President of Charles Scribner's Sons
- In office 1952–1984
- Preceded by: Charles Scribner III

Personal details
- Born: July 13, 1921 Quogue, New York, US
- Died: November 11, 1995 (aged 74) New York City, US
- Spouse: Joan Sunderland
- Children: 3
- Parent(s): Vera Gordon Bloodgood; Charles Scribner III
- Relatives: Charles Scribner II (grandfather); Charles Scribner I (great-grandfather)
- Education: St. Paul's School
- Alma mater: Princeton University

Charles Scribner IV (July 13, 1921 – November 11, 1995), also known as Charles Scribner Jr., was the head of the Charles Scribner's Sons publishing company. He was a resident of Manhattan for most of his adult life, living on the Upper East Side since 1945.

== Early life ==
Scribner was born in Quogue, New York, on July 13, 1921, to Vera Gordon Bloodgood and Charles Scribner III and was raised in Far Hills, New Jersey.

He attended St. Paul's School in Concord, New Hampshire, for secondary school. He graduated as salutatorian from Princeton University in 1943, receiving his A.B. degree, summa cum laude. Nine members of his family, over six generations, have been graduates of Princeton.

He was a Navy cryptanalyst during World War II and the Korean War.

== Career ==
He succeeded his father, Charles Scribner III, in 1952 as chief of Charles Scribner's Sons, which had been founded by his great-grandfather, Charles Scribner I, in 1846. In 1952, he succeeded his father as President of Scribners. He served in that role until 1977 when he became chairman in 1977. In 1978, he became chairman of the Scribner Book Companies, the holding company. He oversaw the operations until 1984, when the company was bought out by Macmillan Publishing.

He was a charter trustee of Princeton University from 1969 to 1979. He was a trustee of the Princeton University Press from 1949 to 1981, also serving as its president from 1957 to 1968. He was president of the American Book Publishers Council from 1966 to 1968.

Scribner was elected to the American Philosophical Society in 1982.

=== Authorship ===
In his book In the Company of Writers, Charles Scribner discusses the publication of The Secret River by Marjorie Rawlings, noting that Rawlings never mentions the race of the character, Calpurnia. Since the book went into production after her death, Rawlings could not be consulted about her final intentions. At this time the depiction of black children in American children's literature had decreased, until it was almost non-existent.

While a few books were still appearing, "White (children's) publishers were still not open to books with Black themes", according to Joyce Braden Harris on "African and African-American Traditions in Language Arts". Scribner pointed out that "Whatever our decision, we could land on the wrong side of the school boards", and claims it was his idea to use dark paper in the book as a way to suggest Calpurnia's race, calling it "one of my silent contributions to dissolving the color barrier in the 1950s." The book received a Newbery Honor Award in 1956 for "the most distinguished contribution to American literature for children", and was honored by the American Society of Graphic Arts.

== Personal life ==
Scribner married figure skater Jeanette Kissel "Joan" Sunderland, a great-great-granddaughter of Cornelius Vanderbilt and the two had three children:

- Charles Scribner V, now usually known as Charles Scribner III, a graduate of Princeton University, an art historian and author.
- John Scribner, a Columbia University graduate and visual artist.
- Blair Sunderland Scribner, director of the Buckley School's Middle school.

He died on November 11, 1995, at the Mary Manning Walsh nursing home on York Avenue in Manhattan.
