= Scribner House (Cornwall, New York) =

Historic house in New York, United States

- U.S. National Register of Historic Places
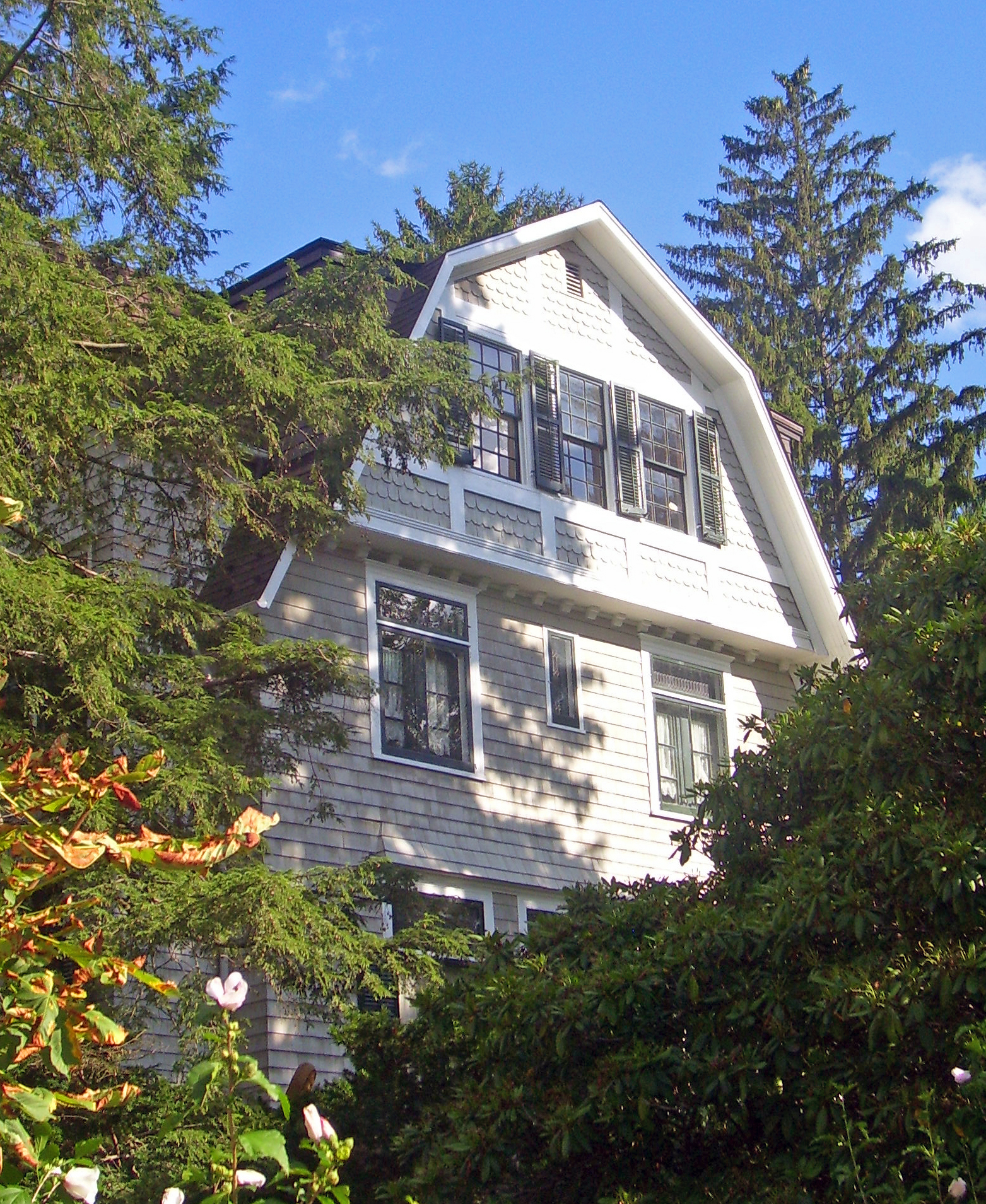
- South profile of house, 2008

- Location within New York Location within the United States
- Location: Cornwall, NY
- Nearest city: Newburgh
- Coordinates: 41°26′15″N 74°1′27″W
- Area: 10 acres (4 ha)
- Built: 1910
- Architect: Mead and Taft
- Architectural style: Shingle style, Colonial Revival
- MPS: Historic and Architectural Resources of Cornwall
- NRHP reference No.: 96000157
- Added to NRHP: March 8, 1996

The Scribner House is located on Roe Avenue in Cornwall, New York, United States. It was built in 1910 as the main house for the summer estate of New York City publishing executive Charles Scribner II, one of Charles Scribner's Sons.

It combines Colonial Revival interiors with a Shingle style exterior, including some hints of the Arts and Crafts Movement. After the Scribners sold the estate, most of the land was sold and this is all that remains. In 1996 it was listed on the National Register of Historic Places.

== Building ==
The house is located near the front of a 10-acre (4 ha) lot along a residential section of Roe Avenue opposite Woodside Lane, just outside the Cornwall-on-Hudson village line. Large evergreen trees shield most of it from public view and provide shade.

It is a two-and-a-half-story frame building with a gambrel roof shingled in wood. It is similarly sided. A large stone central chimney is complemented by a smaller brick one at the northeast corner.

Two pavilions project from the main block, separated by a gable-roofed dormer and a pent-roofed dormer on the second story. The south side has a one-and-a-half-story gambrel-roofed wing, and there is a two-story gabled wing on the east side. A one-story hip-roofed porch is located on the north, and the east wing has a one-story addition that extends around its southern and eastern sides.

The main entrance, on the west, is a centrally located recessed wooden double door with a molded wooden surround and sidelights. Atop it are patterned glass transoms. It opens onto a porch with a stone foundation and steps. Its flat roof is supported by two round Doric columns. A wooden balustrade runs along the top of the porch.

Inside, the house retains much original finishing. There is oak woodwork, including architraves and wainscoting on the walls and ceilings. The main staircase has an intricate newel at its base trimmed in garlands and a Doric balustrade at the landing. Also in the house are brick fireplace mantels, a wood-burning stove and the original light fixtures.

== Aesthetics ==
The large scale of the house and its siting, with views available of the Hudson River and nearby Highlands, is a distinctive feature of country estate houses such as the one the Scribner estate originally was. Its more detailed landscaping distinguishes it from the country houses of earlier periods in Cornwall.

The architecture combines a Shingle-style exterior treatment with a Colonial Revival interior. The former is most visible on the outside not only in the choice of siding but features such as the projecting dormers, strips of windows, and recessed entrance.

The exterior also shows the influence of the contemporary "Parks" period of the Arts and Crafts Movement. Houses of the "Parks" period, many of which were built in the Adirondack and Catskill parks elsewhere in New York in the early 20th century. It focused on the relation of people in the house to their surroundings, particularly the natural environment. Features of the Scribner House that reflect that period are the large window areas and interior spaces, meant to integrate outside and inside, and the use of natural motifs such as leaves and flowers in the wood detailing and stained glass in the house.

Most of the interior trim reflects the Colonial Revival movement, also current at the time of construction. Its most notable features in the house are the woodwork: the oak staircase, landing, wainscoting and corner fireplaces.

== History ==
The Scribners built the house in 1910, at a time when Cornwall was still the popular summer destination it had become late in the previous century. Originally it was part of a much larger estate in a park-like setting outside the village of Cornwall-on-Hudson, where most other resort housing was. Mead and Taft, a local firm also responsible for other summer houses in Cornwall like Cherry Croft, was the architect.

In the 1950s, the original large veranda along the second story was removed, leaving only the current section atop the porch. This is the only significant change that has been made to the house during its entire existence. Scribners' heirs sold the property in the 1960s, and the estate was gradually subdivided until only the current ten acres were left.
