= John Blair Scribner =

American publisher

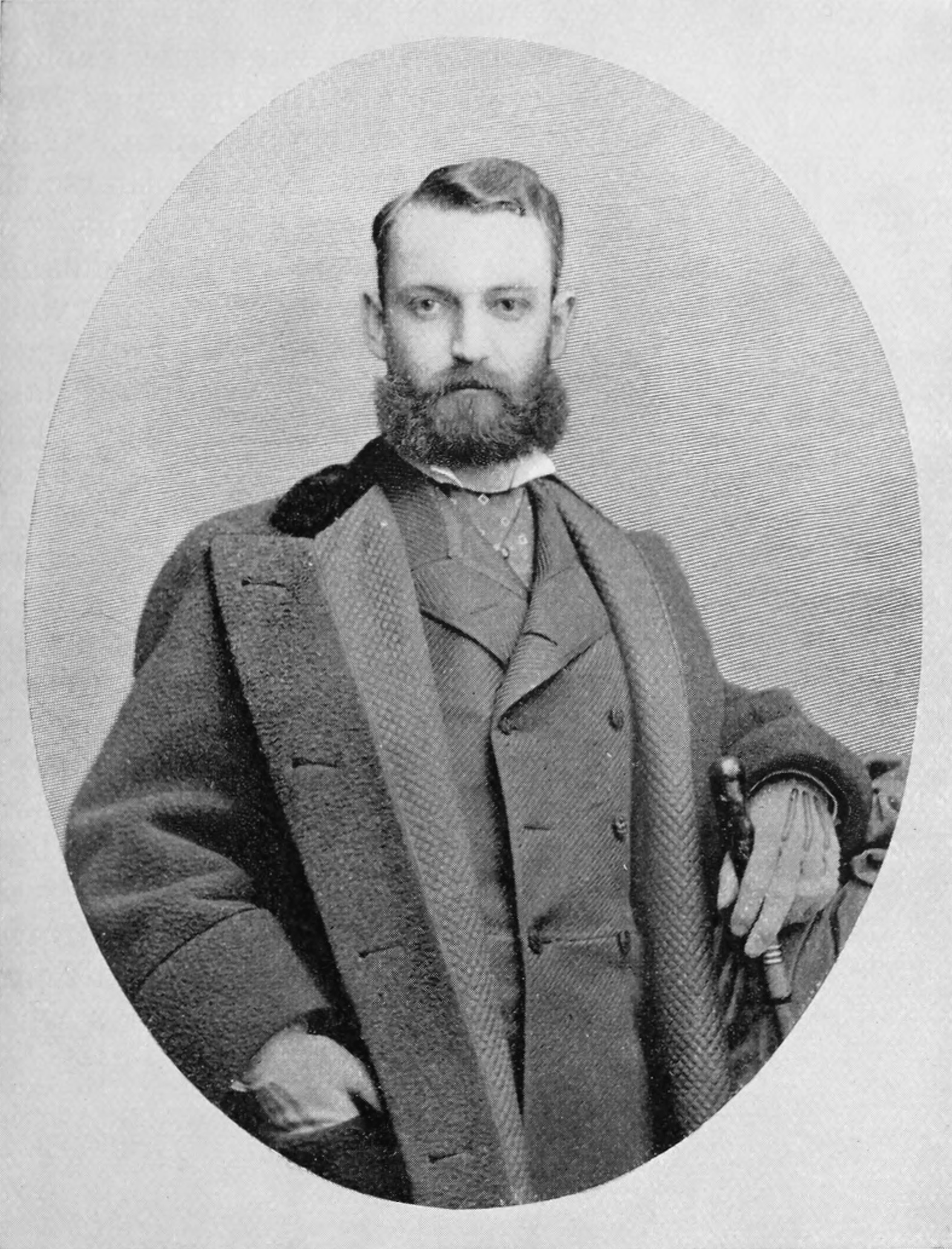

President of Charles Scribner's Sons
- In office 1871–1879
- Preceded by: Charles Scribner I
- Succeeded by: Charles Scribner II

Personal details
- Born: June 4, 1850 New York City
- Died: January 21, 1879 (aged 28) Manhattan
- Spouse: Lucy Ann Skidmore (m. 1875; died 1879)
- Parent(s): Charles Scribner I Emma Elizabeth Blair
- Relatives: Arthur Hawley Scribner (brother); Charles Scribner II (brother); John Insley Blair (grandfather)
- Education: Princeton University

John Blair Scribner (June 4, 1850 – January 21, 1879) was the president of Charles Scribner's Sons from 1871 to 1879.

== Early life ==
Scribner was born on June 4, 1850 in New York City. He was the eldest son of Charles Scribner I and Emma Elizabeth Blair (1827-1869). Among his brothers were Arthur Hawley Scribner and Charles Scribner II.

His grandfather and namesake was John Insley Blair. He attended Princeton College, but did not graduate, but instead he came to work at Charles Scribner Company with his father.

== Career ==
Upon the death of his father in August 1871, Charles Scribner and Co. was reorganized as Scribner, Armstrong, and Co. with John as president. The partners in the new firm were John Blair Scribner, Andrew C. Armstrong, and Edward Seymour. In 1877, the publication house moved to 743 Broadway. Upon Seymour's death in April 1877, and Armstrong's retirement in 1878, the firm-name was changed to Charles Scribner's Sons. After John died in 1879, the business was run by his younger brothers, Charles and Arthur.

== Personal life ==
He married Lucy Ann Skidmore (1853-1931), a daughter of Lucy Ann (née Hawley) Skidmore and coal merchant Joseph Russell Skidmore. After his death, she established "The Young Women's Industrial Club" in Saratoga Springs, New York, which in 1911, was renamed the "Skidmore School of Arts," eventually becoming what is known today as Skidmore College.

Scribner died of pneumonia on January 21, 1879, at the age of 28. According to his obituarist, just before he died, Scribner told his brother, Charles Scribner II, "Cheer up old fellow. You always look on the dark side. I shall soon be all right again." His funeral was held at the Church of the Covenant on January 23, 1879.
