= Charles Scribner III =

American publisher (1890–1952)

President of Charles Scribner's Sons
- In office 1932–1952
- Preceded by: Arthur Hawley Scribner
- Succeeded by: Charles Scribner IV

Personal details
- Born: January 26, 1890 Manhattan
- Died: January 11, 1952 (aged 61) Manhattan
- Spouse: Vera Gordon Bloodgood (m. 1915; died 1952)
- Children: Julia Scribner Bigham; Charles Scribner IV
- Parent(s): Charles Scribner II; Louise Flagg
- Relatives: Charles Scribner I (grandfather)
- Education: Princeton University (1913)

Charles Scribner III (January 26, 1890 – February 11, 1952), also known as Charles Scribner Jr., was president of Charles Scribner's Sons publishing company starting in 1932.

== Early life ==
He was born on January 26, 1890, in New York City. He was the only son of Charles Scribner II and Louise Flagg (1862–1948).

His maternal grandparents were Amelia Louisa (née Hart) Flagg and Jared Bradley Flagg, an Episcopal priest and a notable painter. His uncle was Ernest Flagg, a notable architect who designed two Beaux-Arts buildings for Scribner's New York headquarters.

He graduated from Princeton University in 1913.

== Career ==
After graduating from Princeton, he went to work for the Charles Scribner's Sons publishing company, which had been founded by his grandfather in 1846. After seven years as vice president of the firm, he was made president of Scribner's in 1932, succeeding his uncle, Arthur Hawley Scribner. He served as president until his death in 1952.

== Personal life ==
In 1915, Scribner was married to Vera Gordon Bloodgood (1891–1985), daughter of Hildreth Kennedy Bloodgood, Together, they were the parents of:

- Julia Bloodgood Scribner (1918–1961), who married the Rev. Thomas James Bigham Jr., son of the Rev. Thomas James Bigham, canon of Trinity Episcopal Church in Pittsburgh, in 1945.
- Charles Scribner IV (1921–1995), who married Jeanette Kissel Sunderland, a descendant of Cornelius Vanderbilt.

Scribner died in New York City on February 11, 1952.
