= Scribner's Monthly =

American literary periodical published from 1870 until 1881

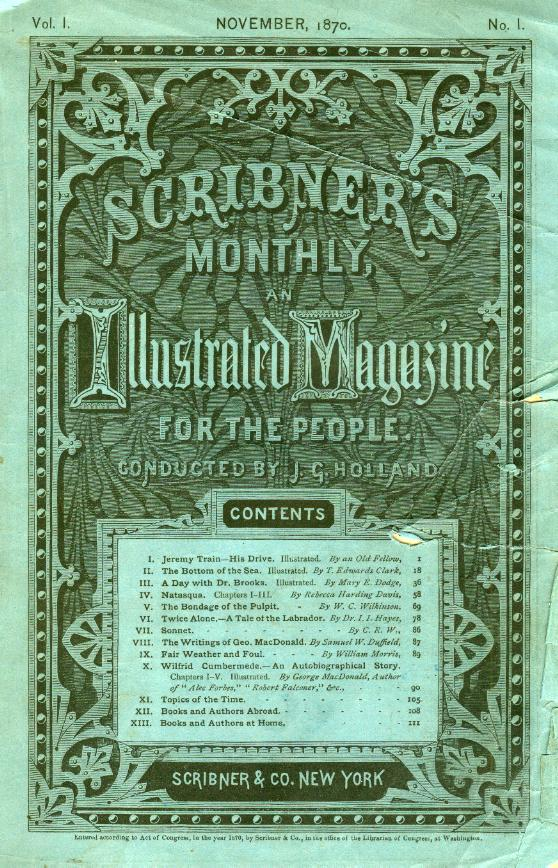
- The first issue of Scribner's Monthly, November 1870
- Editor: J. G. Holland
- Categories: Pictorial, literature
- Frequency: Monthly
- First issue: November 1870
- Final issue: October 1881
- Company: Scribner & Co.
- Country: United States
- Based in: New York City
- Language: English

Scribner's Monthly: An Illustrated Magazine for the People was an illustrated American literary periodical published from 1870 until 1881. Following a change in ownership in 1881 of the company that had produced it, the magazine was relaunched as The Century Magazine.

== History ==
Charles Scribner I, Andrew Armstrong, Arthur Peabody, Edward Seymour, Josiah Gilbert Holland, and Roswell Smith established Scribner & Co. on July 19, 1870, to start on the publication of Scribner's Monthly. Scribner's Monthly absorbed the second incarnation of Putnam's Monthly Magazine of American Literature, Science and Art. The first issue of the newly formed periodical was published in November of that year.

In April 1881, Charles Scribner II sold his share of the Scribner & Co. company to Roswell Smith. The names of the magazine and the company were retooled, dropping mention of 'Scribner'; Scribner's Monthly was changed to The Century Magazine and Scribner & Co. was changed to Century Company.

Charles Scribner II was unable to launch a competing magazine for five years. In 1886, Scribner announced to a Times reporter that they would make a new monthly publication "as soon as the necessary arrangements could be perfected". Scribner also announced that the editor would be Edward Burlingame, the son of Anson Burlingame, who was already connected to the publishing house as a literary advisor.

Scribner further noted that the magazine would not be a revival of the formerly published Scribner's Monthly.

== Contributors ==
Notable contributors have included Charles Barnard, Hjalmar Hjorth Boyesen, Truman C. Everts, Edmund Gosse, Frances Hodgson Burnett, Sidney Lanier, John Muir and others.
