= Arthur Hawley Scribner =

American publisher (1859–1932)

President of Charles Scribner's Sons
- In office 1930–1932
- Preceded by: Charles Scribner II
- Succeeded by: Charles Scribner III

Personal details
- Born: March 15, 1859 Manhattan, New York, US
- Died: July 3, 1932 (aged 73) Mount Kisco, New York, US
- Spouse: Helen C. Annan (m. 1900)
- Parent(s): Charles Scribner I Emma Elizabeth Blair
- Relatives: Charles Scribner II (brother); John Blair Scribner (brother)
- Education: Princeton University (BA)

Arthur Hawley Scribner (March 15, 1859 – July 3, 1932) was president of Charles Scribner's Sons.

== Early life and education ==
He was born on March 15, 1859, in Manhattan. He was a son of Emma Elizabeth (née Blair) Scribner (1827–1869) and Charles Scribner I.

While at Princeton University he started the Ivy Club before graduating in 1881.

== Career ==
He joined Charles Scribner's Sons in 1881. Following the death of his brother, Charles Scribner II, in 1930, he became president of the company. He served as president until his own death in 1932. He was succeeded in the presidency by his nephew, Charles Scribner III.

== Personal life ==
He died in Mount Kisco, New York, on July 3, 1932. He left $150,000 to Princeton University in his will.
