= Charles Scribner I =

American publisher (1821–1871)

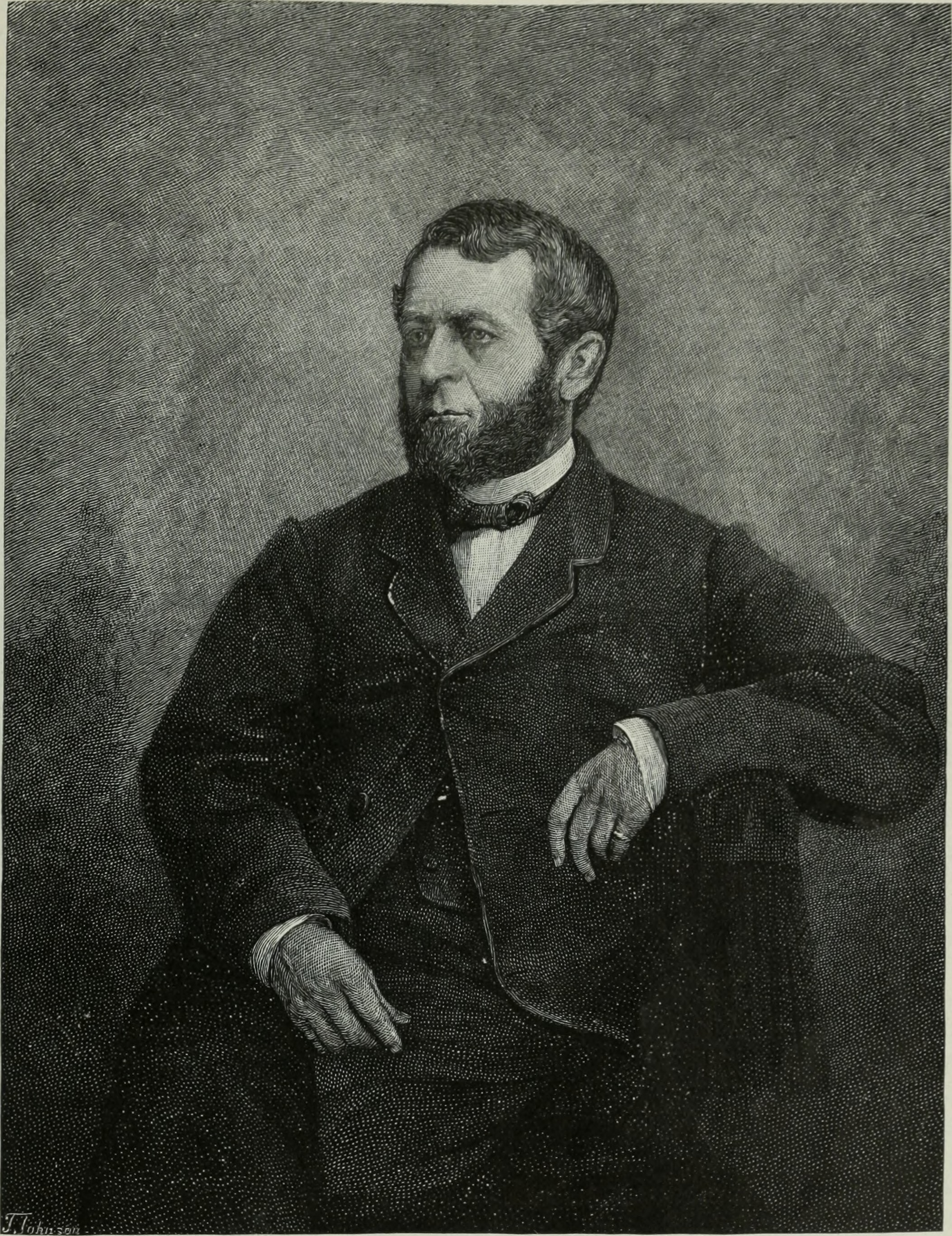
- Born: February 21, 1821; New York City, U.S.
- Died: August 26, 1871 (aged 50); Lucerne, Switzerland
- Education: Lawrenceville School; New York University; Princeton University (1840)
- Spouse: Emma Elizabeth Blair (m. 1846; died 1869)
- Children: John Blair Scribner; Emma Locke Scribner; Charles Scribner II; Arthur Hawley Scribner
- Parent(s): Uriah Rogers Scribner; Betsey Hawley
- Relatives: Charles Scribner III (grandson); Charles Scribner IV (great-grandson)

Charles Scribner I (February 21, 1821 – August 26, 1871) was an American publisher who, with Isaac D. Baker (1819–1850), founded a publishing company that would eventually become Charles Scribner's Sons.

== Early life ==
Scribner was born in New York City on February 21, 1821. He was the son of Uriah Rogers Scribner (1778–1853) and Betsey (née Hawley) Scribner (1787–1871). Among his siblings were the Rev. William Scribner and Walter Scribner, a druggist. His sister Martha was the wife of George W. Schuyler, and their family included sons Eugene Schuyler, and Walter S. Schuyler, as well as grandson Walter S. Grant.

He attended the Lawrenceville School from 1834 to 1837. After a year's study at New York University, he entered Princeton University and graduated with the class of 1840. He began the study of law, but was obliged by ill health to make a trip to Europe.

== Career ==
After returning from Europe, in 1846 Scribner became the younger partner of Baker in forming a new kind of publishing house under the firm name of Baker and Scribner. Unlike traditional houses, which were generally outgrowths of printing companies or book sellers, theirs would exist purely as a publisher. This had an influence on the character of its publications, which were chiefly confined to the works of contemporary authors. It also published Presbyterian philosophy books.

With the death of Baker in 1850, Scribner gained control of the company, renaming it Charles Scribner, and then Charles Scribner and Company. With Charles Welford, who died in London on 18 May 1885 and was buried at Highgate Cemetery, he formed the house of Scribner and Welford in 1857 for the importation of foreign books.

In 1865, Charles Scribner and Co. made its first venture into magazine publishing with Hours at Home, a monthly magazine. In 1870 this magazine was merged into Scribner's Monthly under the editorship of Josiah G. Holland, and published by a separate company, Scribner and Co., with Dr. Holland and Roswell Smith as part owners.

Upon Scribner's death the next year in August 1871, Charles Scribner and Co. was reorganized as Scribner, Armstrong, and Co. The partners in the new firm were Scribner's eldest son, John Blair Scribner, Andrew C. Armstrong, and Edward Seymour. In 1877, the publication house moved to 743 Broadway. Upon Seymour's death in April 1877, and Armstrong's retirement in 1878, the firm-name was changed to Charles Scribner's Sons, under which form the business was conducted after John Blair Scribner's death in 1879 by Charles Scribner and Arthur H. Scribner, younger brothers of John Blair.

== Personal life ==
In 1846, Scribner was married to Emma Elizabeth Blair (1827–1869), daughter of the magnate John Insley Blair and Nancy Ann (née Locke) Blair. Her brother DeWitt Clinton Blair, continued their father's business and his son, C. Ledyard Blair, was a prominent investment banker. Together, they were the parents of:

- John Blair Scribner (1850–1879), who married Lucy Ann Hawley Skidmore (1853–1931) in 1875. After his death, she founded Skidmore College.
- Emma Locke Scribner (1852–1922), who married Walter Cranston Larned (1850–1914), art editor of the Chicago Daily News.
- Charles Scribner II (1854–1930), who married Louise Flagg (1862–1948), daughter of priest and painter Jared Bradley Flagg and sister of architect Ernest Flagg.
- Arthur Hawley Scribner (1859–1932), who married Helen Annan (1868–1928).

He died of typhoid on August 26, 1871, while traveling in Lucerne, Switzerland. He is interred in the family plot at Woodlawn Cemetery in the Bronx, New York City.
