= Charles Scribner's Sons =

American publisher

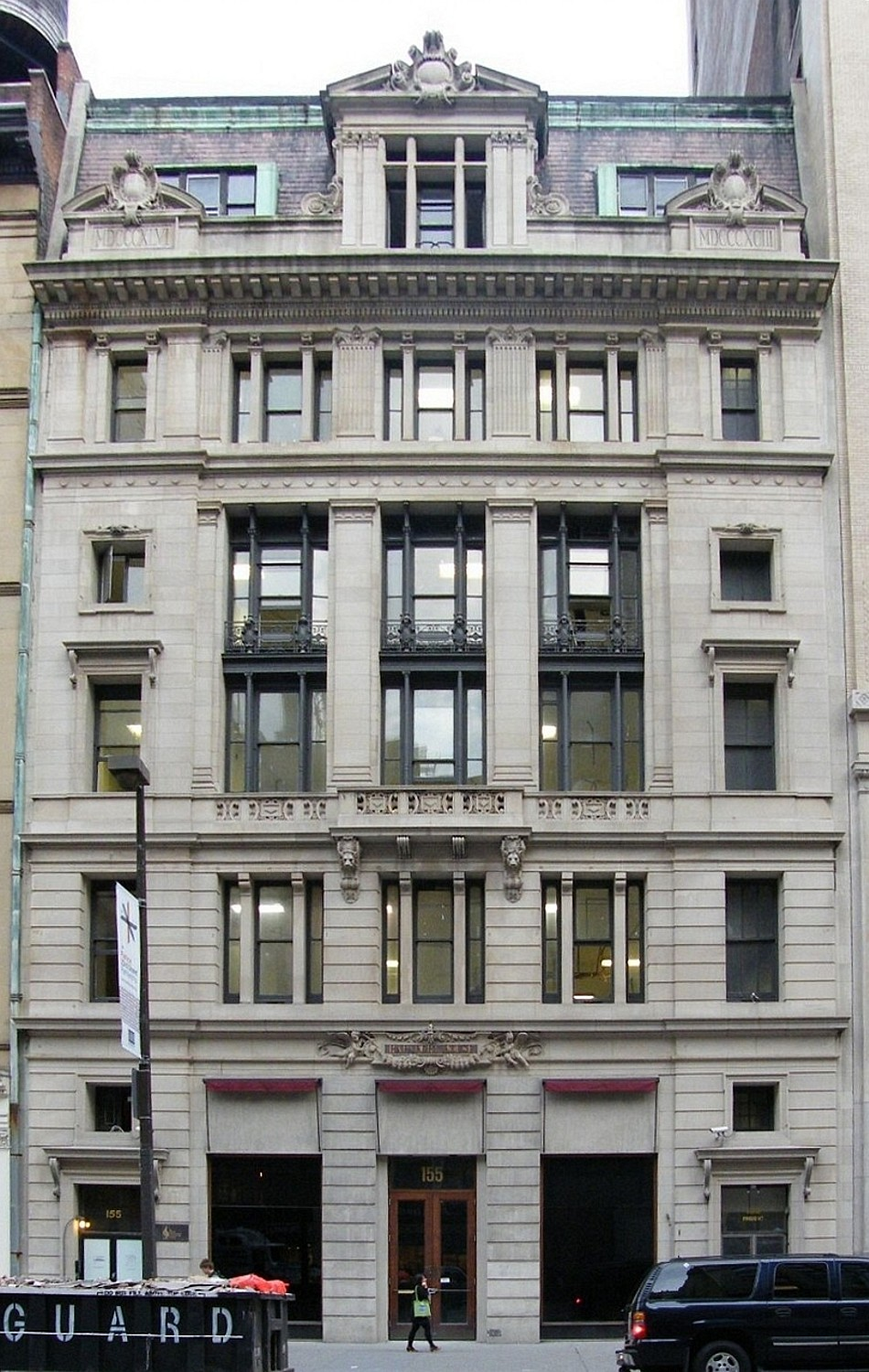
- Scribner Building, 153–157 Fifth Avenue (2021)
- Parent company: Simon & Schuster (trade), Gale (reference)
- Founded: 1846; 180 years ago
- Founder: Charles Scribner I; Isaac D. Baker
- Country of origin: United States
- Headquarters location: 153–157 Fifth Avenue, New York City, U.S.
- Distribution: Worldwide
- Publication types: Books
- Fiction genres: American literature
- Imprints: Marysue Rucci
- Owners: Kohlberg Kravis Roberts (trade); Cengage Group (reference and trademark)
- Official website: scribnerbooks.com

Charles Scribner's Sons, or simply Scribner's or Scribner, is an American publisher based in New York City that has published several notable American authors, including Henry James, Ernest Hemingway, F. Scott Fitzgerald, Kurt Vonnegut, Marjorie Kinnan Rawlings, Stephen King, Robert A. Heinlein, Thomas Wolfe, George Santayana, John Clellon Holmes, Don DeLillo, and Edith Wharton.

The firm published Scribner's Magazine for many years. More recently, several Scribner titles and authors have garnered Pulitzer Prizes, National Book Awards and other merits. In 1978, the company merged with Atheneum and became The Scribner Book Companies. It merged into Macmillan in 1984.

Simon & Schuster bought Macmillan in 1994. By this point, only the trade book and reference book operations still bore the original family name. After the merger, the Macmillan and Atheneum adult lists were merged into Scribner's, and the Scribner's children list was merged into Atheneum. The trade division, now simply "Scribner", was retained by Simon & Schuster, while the reference division and the trademarks have been owned by Gale since 1999 and Simon & Schuster licensed the Scribner trademark for trade publishing from Gale. As of 2012, Scribner is a division of Simon & Schuster under the title Scribner Publishing Group, including the Touchstone Books imprint.

The president of Scribner as of 2017 is Susan Moldow (who also held the position of publisher from 1994 to 2012), and the current publisher is Nan Graham.

== History ==
The firm was founded in 1846 by Charles Scribner I and Isaac D. Baker as "Baker & Scribner." After Baker's death, Scribner bought the remainder of the company and renamed it the "Charles Scribner Company." In 1865, the company first ventured into magazine publishing with Hours at Home.

In 1870, the Scribners organized a new firm, Scribner and Company, to publish a magazine entitled Scribner's Monthly. After the death of Charles Scribner I in 1871, his son John Blair Scribner took over as president of the company. His other sons Charles Scribner II and Arthur Hawley Scribner would also join the firm in 1875 and 1884. They each later served as presidents. When the other partners in the venture sold their stake to the family, the company was renamed Charles Scribner's Sons.

The company launched St. Nicholas Magazine in 1873 with Mary Mapes Dodge as editor and Frank R. Stockton as assistant editor; it became well known as a children's magazine. When the Scribner family sold the magazine company to outside investors in 1881, Scribner's Monthly was renamed the Century Magazine. The Scribner brothers were enjoined from publishing any magazine for a period.

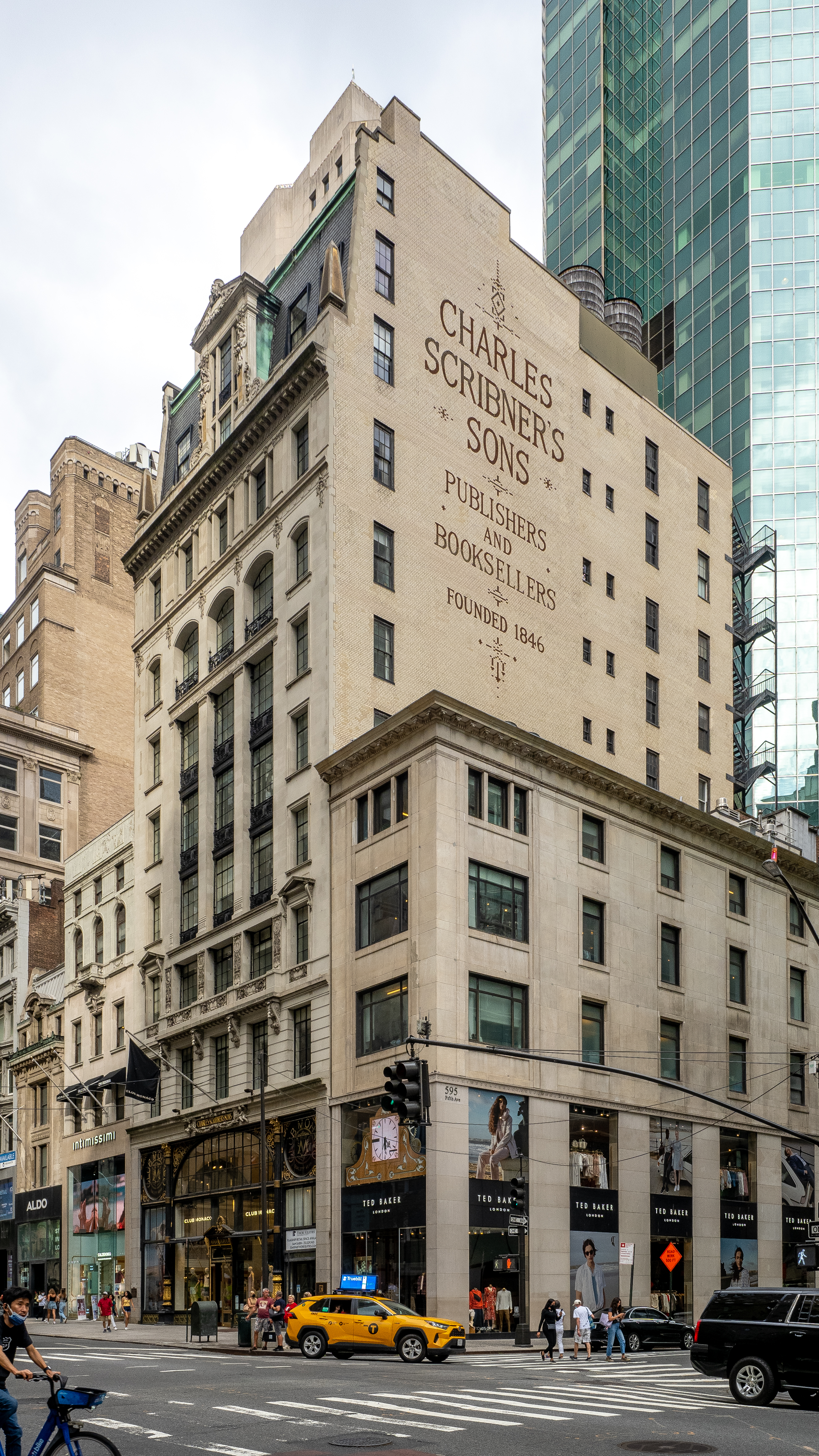
597 Fifth Avenue

In 1886, at the expiration of this term, they launched Scribner's Magazine. The firm's headquarters were in the Scribner Building, built in 1893, on lower Fifth Avenue at 21st Street, and later in the Charles Scribner's Sons Building, on Fifth Avenue in midtown. Both buildings were designed by Ernest Flagg in a Beaux Arts style.

The children's book division was established in 1934 under the leadership of Alice Dalgliesh. It published works by distinguished authors and illustrators including N.C. Wyeth, Robert A. Heinlein, Marcia Brown, Will James, Marjorie Kinnan Rawlings, and Leo Politi.

Scribner merged with Atheneum in 1978 and into Macmillan Inc. in 1984. In 1994, Macmillan was bought by Simon & Schuster. The reference division along with Charles Scribner's Sons and Scribner trademarks were sold as part of Simon & Schuster's Macmillan Library Reference (MLR) to Pearson in 1998, Pearson resold MLR to Thomson Corporation a year later. Thomson Corporation placed the acquired MLR divisions into Gale.

Thomson Learning including Gale became Cengage Group in 2007, Simon & Schuster licensed the Scribner trademarks for trade publishing from Gale.

Simon & Schuster reorganized their adult imprints into four divisions in 2012. Scribner became the Scribner Publishing Group and would expand to include Touchstone Books, which had previously been part of Free Press. The other divisions are Atria Publishing Group, Simon & Schuster Publishing Group, and the Gallery Publishing Group. Susan Moldow would lead the new Scribner division as president.

As of 2023, the reference division and the trademarks are owned by Cengage Group and the trade division is owned by Kohlberg Kravis Roberts.

== Presidents ==
- Charles Scribner I (1821–1871), 1846 to 1871
- John Blair Scribner (1850–1879), 1871 to 1879
- Charles Scribner II (1854–1930), 1879 to 1930
- Arthur Hawley Scribner (1859–1932), 1930 to 1932
- Charles Scribner III (1890–1952), 1932 to 1952
- Charles Scribner IV (1921–1995), 1952 to 1984

=== Notable authors ===
==== Notable authors under Charles Scribner II ====
- Edith Wharton
- Henry James

==== Notable authors under Charles Scribner's Sons ====
- Kenneth Grahame
- Ernest Hemingway
- Susanne Langer
- Ring Lardner
- Reinhold Niebuhr
- Marjorie Kinnan Rawlings
- George Santayana
- Thomas Wolfe

==== Notable authors under Maxwell Perkins and John Hall Wheelock ====
- F. Scott Fitzgerald
- Thomas Wolfe
- Ernest Hemingway
- Ring Lardner
- Erskine Caldwell
- S. S. Van Dine
- James Jones
- Alan Paton

==== Notable authors under Simon and Schuster ====
Simon & Schuster has published thousands of books from thousands of authors. This list represents some of the more notable authors (those who are culturally significant or have had several bestsellers) from Scribner since becoming part of Simon & Schuster.

- Annie Proulx
- Andrew Solomon
- Anthony Doerr
- Don DeLillo
- Frank McCourt
- Stephen King (1998–present for new releases; 2016–present for re-releases in US/Canada)
- Jeannette Walls

== Names ==
- Baker & Scribner, until the death of Baker in 1850
- Charles Scribner Company
- Charles Scribner's Sons, name retained for the reference division, now part of Gale
- Scribner

== Bookstores ==
The Scribner Bookstores are now owned by Barnes & Noble.

== See also ==
- Charles Scribner I
- Scribner's Monthly
- Scribner's Magazine
- Simon & Schuster
- Scribner Building
