= Lucy Skidmore Scribner =

Founder of Skidmore College (1853–1931)

- Born: Lucy Ann Skidmore; July 4, 1853; New York City
- Died: May 2, 1931 (aged 77); Saratoga Springs, New York
- Known for: Skidmore College
- Spouse: John Blair Scribner (m. 1875; died 1879)
- Parent(s): Joseph Russell Skidmore (1821-1882); Lucy Ann Hawley Skidmore (1821-1853)

Lucy Skidmore Scribner (July 4, 1853 – May 2, 1931) was the founder of Skidmore College.

== Biography ==
She was born on July 4, 1853, to Joseph Russell Skidmore (1821–1882), a coal merchant, and Lucy Ann Hawley (1821–1853). Lucy's grandparents were Jeremiah and Judith Ludlam Skidmore and Irad and Sarah Holmes Hawley. In 1875 she married John Blair Scribner. The couple resided at 21 East 48th Street in New York for their marriage. In 1879, after just 4 years of marriage, Lucy was widowed when her husband died of pneumonia.

In 1903, she created "The Young Women's Industrial Club" in Saratoga Springs, New York, and in 1911, the club was renamed the "Skidmore School of Arts" and chartered as a college to vocationally and professionally train young women. In 1922, the school became a four-year, degree-granting institution for women and was renamed "Skidmore College." In 1971, Skidmore College became co-educational. Lucy Skidmore Scribner died on May 2, 1931. and is buried in Woodlawn Cemetery in the Bronx near her husband.
