= Charles Scribner II =

American businessman (1854–1930)

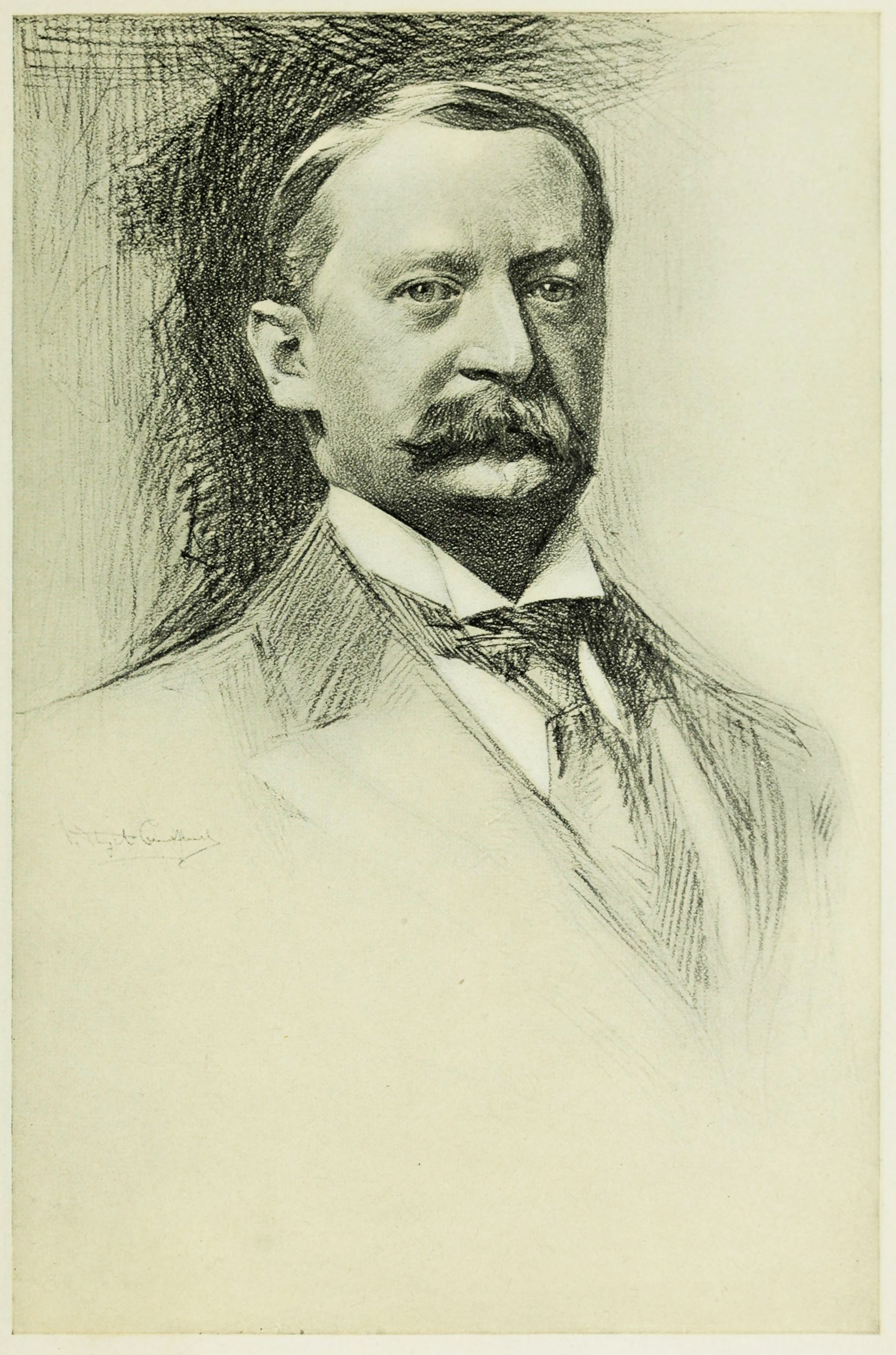
- Portrait of Charles Scribner II by V. Floyd Campbell

President of Charles Scribner's Sons
- In office 1879–1930
- Preceded by: John Blair Scribner
- Succeeded by: Arthur Hawley Scribner

Personal details
- Born: October 18, 1854 Manhattan, New York, US
- Died: April 19, 1930 (aged 75) Manhattan, New York, US
- Spouse: Louise Flagg
- Children: 2, including Charles
- Parent(s): Charles Scribner I Emma Elizabeth Blair
- Relatives: Arthur Hawley Scribner (brother); John Blair Scribner (brother); Ernest Flagg (brother-in-law)
- Education: Princeton University

Charles Scribner II (October 18, 1854 – April 19, 1930) was the president of Charles Scribner's Sons and a trustee at Skidmore College.

== Early life ==
He was born in New York City on October 18, 1854. He was the son of Emma Elizabeth Blair (1827–1869) and Charles Scribner I.

== Career ==
He joined his father's publishing company in 1875 after his Princeton graduation. When the other partners in the venture sold their stake to the family, the company was renamed Charles Scribner's Sons. In 1884, Scribner's younger brother, Arthur Hawley Scribner, joined Charles Scribner's Sons. The book publishing business was highly successful, and in 1886 Scribner's Magazine was relaunched. It too was a great success.

In 1889, Scribner was a founding member of the American Publishers Association. He was a trustee at Skidmore College.

== Personal life ==
In 1882, Scribner was married to Louise Flagg (1862–1948), a daughter of Amelia Louisa (née Hart) Flagg and Jared Bradley Flagg, an Episcopal priest and a notable painter. Scribner's brother-in-law, Ernest Flagg, was an architect and designed two Beaux-Arts buildings for the firm's New York headquarters. Together, Charles and Louise were the parents of:

- Louise Scribner (1883–1963), who married George Richard Delaplaine Schieffelin, son of George Richard Schieffelin and a grandson of U.S. Representative Isaac C. Delaplaine, in 1904. They divorced in 1941.
- Charles Scribner III (1890–1952), who married Vera Gordon Bloodgood, daughter of Hildreth Kennedy Bloodgood, in 1915.

He died on April 19, 1930.

=== Legacy ===
His summer house in Cornwall, New York, was later listed on the National Register of Historic Places.
