= De Vinne Press Building =

Commercial building in Manhattan, New York

- U.S. National Register of Historic Places
- New York State Register of Historic Places
- New York City Landmark
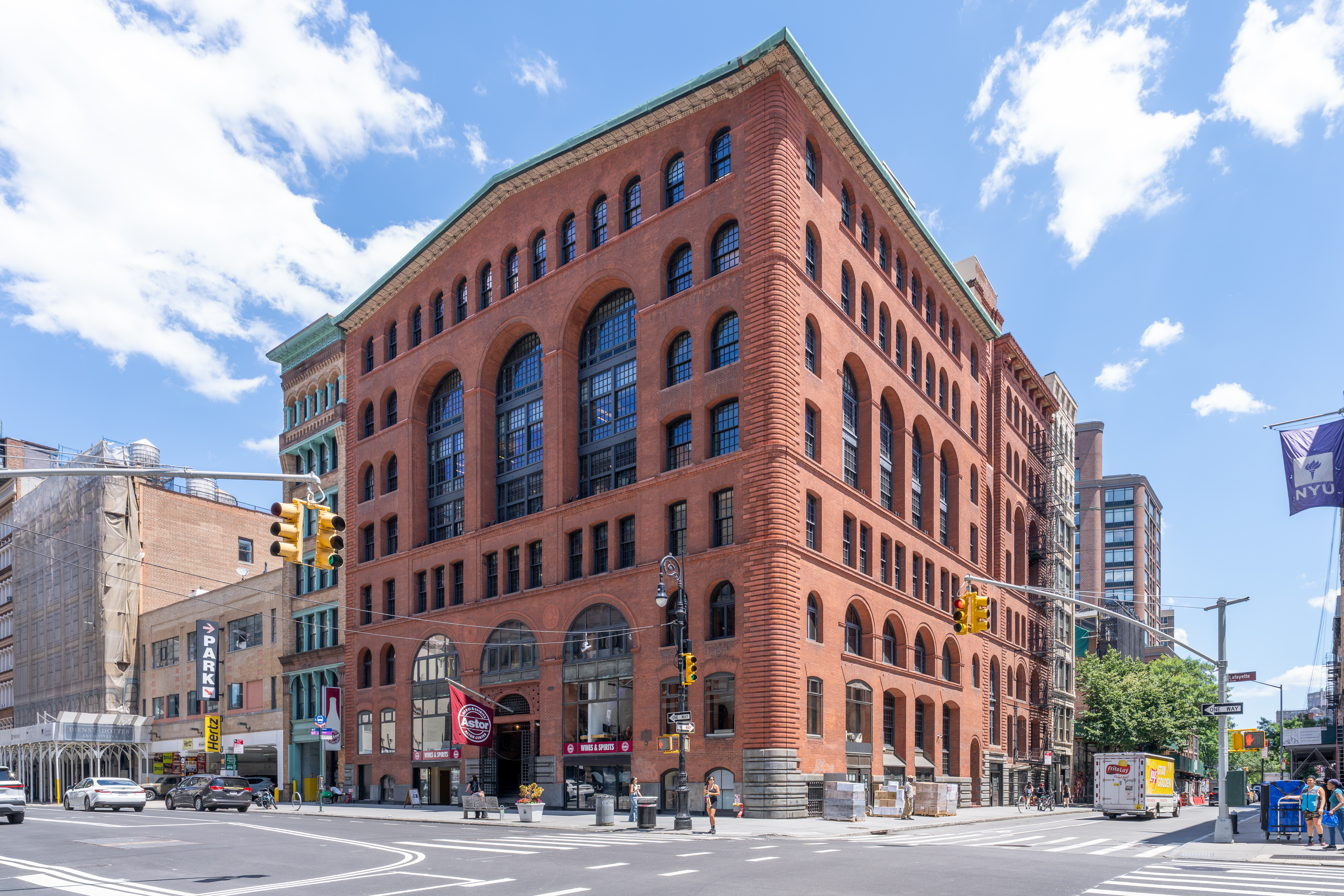
- The building viewed from Lafayette and 4th streets (2026)

- Location within Manhattan Location within New York City Location within New York Location within the United States
- Interactive map of De Vinne Press Building
- Location: 393–399 Lafayette Street, Manhattan, New York, U.S.
- Coordinates: 40°43′40″N 73°59′33″W
- Built: 1885–1886
- Architect: Babb, Cook & Willard
- Architectural style: Romanesque Revival
- NRHP reference No.: 77000955
- NYSRHP No.: 06101.000060
- NYCL No.: 0201

Significant dates
- Added to NRHP: September 14, 1977
- Designated NYSRHP: June 23, 1980
- Designated NYCL: October 19, 1966

The De Vinne Press Building is a commercial building and former printing plant at 393–399 Lafayette Street, at the corner of Fourth Street, in the NoHo neighborhood of Manhattan in New York City, New York. The building was designed by the firm of Babb, Cook & Willard in the Romanesque Revival style. It is a New York City designated landmark and is on the National Register of Historic Places.

The De Vinne Press Building is seven stories high, excluding the raised basement. The facade is made of brick and terracotta, with decorations concentrated on the southern and western elevations, which face Fourth Street and Lafayette Street, respectively. Each facade includes segmental arches and round-arched windows, as well as horizontal belt courses. Inside, the building has a mostly rectangular floor plan. The interiors were designed in a utilitarian style and were intended to accommodate the weight of printing presses. The load-bearing walls are made of brick, and the structure also contains cast-iron columns encased in brick piers.

The building was built in 1885–1886 by Theodore Low De Vinne, a typographer and printer who led the De Vinne Press. He originally owned a 25 percent stake in the property, while the remaining share was owned by Roswell Smith, the founder of the Century Company. The structure expanded east between 1891 and 1892. The press closed in 1922, and De Vinne's heirs sold their interest to Smith's estate in 1929. The building was sold in 1938 to the Walter Peek Paper Corporation, which sold it in the early 1980s to Edwin Fisher. The ground floor has been occupied by Astor Wines and Spirits since 2006, while the upper floors were gradually renovated and converted to offices.

== Site ==
The De Vinne Press Building is at 393–399 Lafayette Street, on the northeast corner with Fourth Street, in the NoHo neighborhood of Manhattan in New York City. The rectangular land lot measures 14,627 square feet (1,359 m^{2}), with a frontage of 124.67 feet (38 m) on Lafayette Street and 117.67 feet (36 m) on Fourth Street. To the east on the same block are the Merchant's House Museum, as well as a public park named Manuel Plaza and the Samuel Tredwell Skidmore House at 37 East Fourth Street. The Astor Library Building (now the Public Theater) and Astor Place Tower are also on the same block to the north. Other nearby buildings include the Firehouse of Engine Company No. 33 one block south; 357 Bowery one block east; and the Schermerhorn Building one block south.

The building's site was historically part of the estate of German-American businessman John Jacob Astor, who acquired the land in 1803 between present-day Astor Place and Great Jones Street. Astor subsequently built his mansion and horse stable nearby. In the 1830s, the wealthiest New Yorkers started to relocate northward from the present-day Financial District of Manhattan, and settled along Lafayette Place (now Lafayette Street). At the time, the area surrounding Lafayette Place was still mostly undeveloped. Residential development in the area peaked at that time before moving northward in the 1840s and 1850s. The surrounding area became a printing hub after the American Civil War, and there were over 20 publishers nearby by the 1880s. Partly due to the presence of the Astor Library, bookbinding and publishing firms such as The De Vinne Press and J.J. Little & Co. settled around Lafayette Place.

== Architecture ==
The De Vinne Press Building was designed in the Romanesque Revival style by the firm Babb, Cook & Willard; the primary designer was likely Walter Cook, a partner in the firm. An addition to the building was completed in 1892. The structure consists of seven stories, excluding the raised basement; if the basement is counted, the building is eight stories tall. (Note: National Park Service 1977, pp. 2–3, refers to the building as having eight stories and labels the basement as the first floor. For consistency, in this article, the story directly above the basement is labeled as the second story, and the top story is labeled as the eighth floor.) The architectural writer Henry-Russell Hitchcock compared the structure's design with that of the Marshall Field's Wholesale Store in Chicago. The De Vinne Press Building's design inspired that of another structure in Manhattan: the Tarrant Building, constructed in 1892 at 278–282 Greenwich Street.

=== Facade ===
The De Vinne Press Building is one of several journalism-related buildings in New York City that were designed in a Rundbogenstil–inspired style, with arches and brick walls. The facade is made of brick and terracotta, with decorations concentrated on the southern and western elevations, facing the street. Both elevations include a mix of segmental arches and round-arched windows, which are interspersed through the facade. Due to the arrangement of the arches, the facade's appearance resembles the design of an old Roman aqueduct. The steel-and-glass windows are recessed deeply into the facade, and elaborate terracotta decorations are used sparingly. Belt courses run horizontally across the facade. The building's gable roof has a shallow slope and is supported by iron trusses, similar to other warehouse buildings of the time.

==== Lafayette Street ====
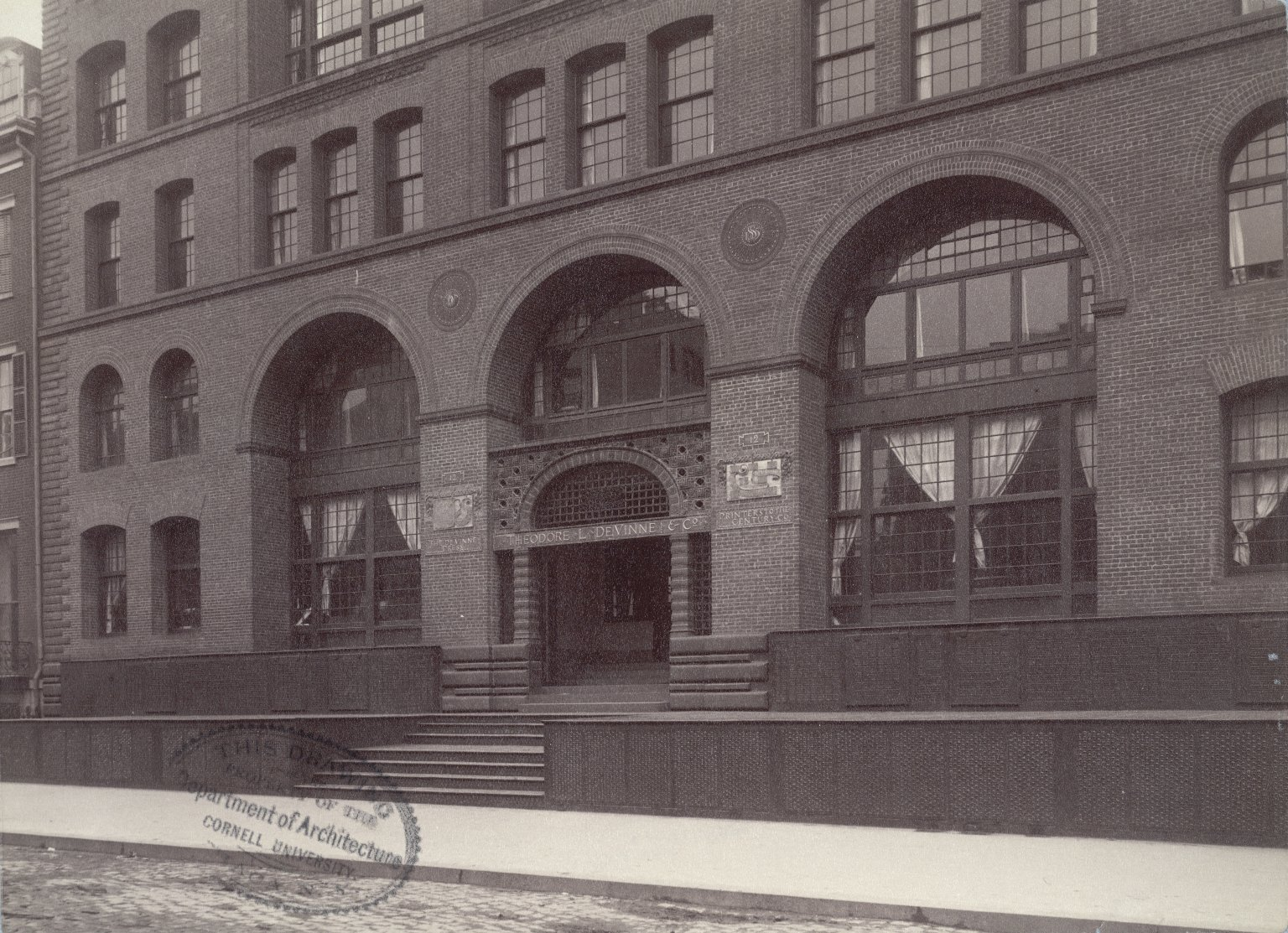
Detail of the front entrance, c. 1886-1895

The Lafayette Street elevation to the west is seven bays wide. Both ends of the facade are ornamented with quoins. On the first through third stories, the three center bays each feature a triple-height archway. The central archway has an arched doorway to its second story, as well as spandrel panels with interlacing patterns. Roundels above the central archway at the third story bear the initials of the building's developer, Theodore Low De Vinne, and the building's year of completion, 1885. The decorations of the main entrance archway were intended to give the building a "domestic scale"; at the time of the building's completion, most of the surrounding structures were low-rise houses. The two outermost bays on either side feature two single-height arched windows on each of the first through third stories. The outermost windows on the first and second floors are segmental arches, while those on the third floor are round arches.

On the fourth floor are 13 segmentally arched windows, with one window in each of the four outer bays and three in each of the three inner bays. The three center bays contain triple-height round-arched window openings on the fifth through seventh floors, which are flanked by two single-height arched windows on each story. The triple-height windows are recessed deeply into the facade. The outermost windows on the fifth floor are segmental arches, while the outer windows on the sixth and seventh floors are round-arched. A belt course separates the eighth story from the floors below, and there are 13 round-arched windows on the eighth floor. A bronze cornice and a gable runs atop the eighth floor. When the building was finished, the bent iron beams of the cornice formed a gutter.

==== Fourth Street ====
The Fourth Street elevation to the south is eleven bays wide. Because of the eastward annex, the Fourth Street elevation is no longer symmetrical. The original facade, which comprises the westernmost six bays, is similar in design to the Lafayette Street elevation, though with a different window arrangement.

In the four center bays of the original facade (now the second through fifth bays from the west), there are double-height segmental arches on the first and second floors, which are flanked by smaller arched openings in the first and sixth bays. On the third story, there are large segmental arches in the original facade's four central bays, while the outer bays have smaller windows. The fourth story of the original facade is divided into ten segmentally-arched windows, with two windows in each of the center bays and one window in each outer bay. On the fifth and sixth stories, the original center bays feature double-height round-arched window openings. The original outer bays each have one segmental-arched window on the fifth story and one round-arched window on the sixth story. On the seventh and eighth floors, the four center bays comprise a row of eight round arches, which are flanked by a single round arch in either of the outer bays.

The seventh bay from the west is flanked by quoins, visually separating the original building to the west and the annex to the east. Within this bay, the first story contains an entrance; the second and third stories have a double-height round arch; and the fourth story has a segmental arch. The upper stories of the seventh bay are recessed and consist of two double-height, round-arched window openings. The four-bay-wide annex to the east is decorated with a wrought-iron fire escape. In contrast to the rest of the building, the annex is topped by a terracotta cornice.

=== Interior ===
The building has a mostly rectangular floor plan. The original building measures 100 feet (30 m) wide on Lafayette Street and 73 feet (22 m) wide on Fourth Street. The annex to the east measures 44 feet (13 m) wide on Fourth Street, narrowing to 25 feet (7.6 m) wide at the rear; the annex measures 100 feet (30 m) deep from front to rear. Because the De Vinne printing plant used paper and flammable materials extensively, the building was constructed with very few flammable materials, aside from wooden window frames. The load-bearing walls are made of brick, except for the interior light court, which has a curtain wall made of rolled-iron girders. The interiors are also supported by wrought-iron interior beams, which was typical for the period. The cast-iron columns inside the building are encased in brick and topped by angled brick capitals.

The interiors were designed in a utilitarian style, as the building was intended solely to function as a printing factory. The floor slabs were designed to support the weight of the printing presses, and they were originally covered in asphalt to absorb vibrations from the presses. The heaviest presses were placed in the cellar. This story was known as the vault and contained storage space for paper and stereotypes, as well as the heating plant and a web press. The cellar vault was illuminated by patent lights on the sidewalk. The cellar space was 20 feet (6.1 m) tall, with floor dimensions of 30 by 110 feet (9.1 by 33.5 m). By the 2000s, the cellar space had been converted into a wine cellar. The basement also has microturbines, which are capable of generating 120 kilowatts (160 hp).

The first floor had presses for fine printing. The main entrance led to a vestibule on the second floor, which had a spiral staircase made of iron, in addition to offices and presses. Of the three floors above, two were used for storage and one was used for typesetting. There was an office on the third floor, as well as composing rooms and press rooms. The sixth floor had a electrotype foundry; the piers on the sixth floor were 5 feet (1.5 m) thick, supporting the heavy equipment above. The top two floors had a bindery. The seventh floor also included dry presses, and the eighth floor had a storage room and mailroom. There were two staircases, one for women and one for men, at opposite corners of the building.

== History ==
Theodore Low De Vinne—a typographer, printer, and cofounder of the printing-history organization Grolier Club—had the building constructed for his printing company, Theodore L. De Vinne & Co. The firm printed several American magazines, including The Century, the St. Nicholas Magazine, and Scribner's Monthly. De Vinne also wrote books such as The Invention of Printing, Correct Composition, and Title Pages. The printer Roswell Smith, founder of the Century Company, published several of De Vinne's publications, including Scribner's Monthly and The Century.

=== De Vinne Press printing plant ===
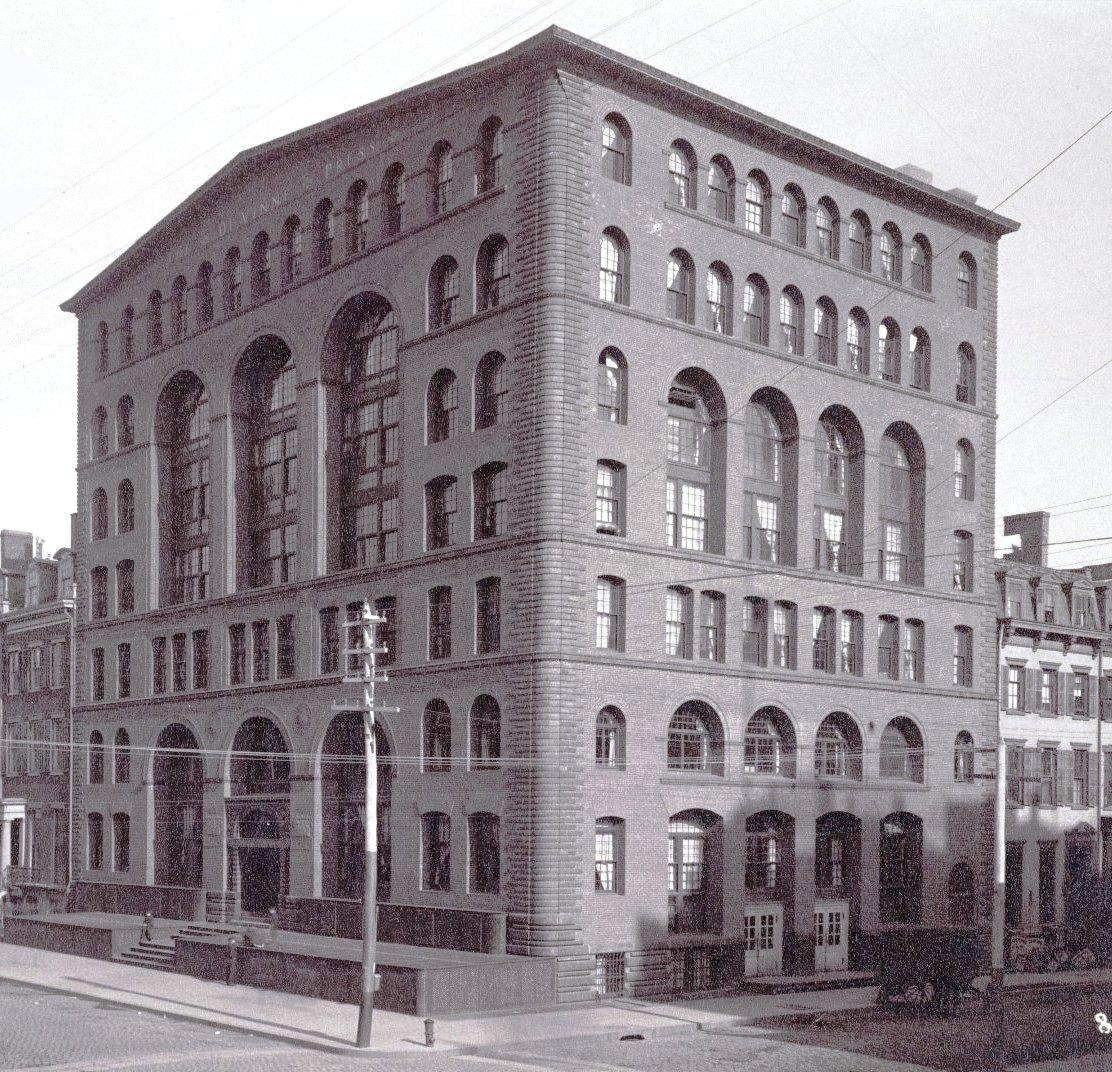
The building seen shortly after its construction

In May 1884, Smith and De Vinne acquired several parcels of land. These included the Maury family's three-story house at 17 East Fourth Street; the Sabine family's three-story house at the northeast corner of Lafayette and Fourth streets; and the Hyatt family's three-story house and store at 19 East Fourth Street. Smith announced that October that he and De Vinne would erect "a large printing and binding establishment" on the site. At the time, the Real Estate Record and Guide predicted that the De Vinne & Co. Building "marks a new era in property hereabouts". Babb, Cook & Willard were hired to design the building, which was planned to cost $300,000 (equivalent to $10,750,000 in 2025). Originally, De Vinne's financial stake in the property was limited to 25 percent, with the remainder held by Roswell Smith. The structure was completed c. 1886; and Smith and De Vinne hosted a lunch that May for the construction contractors and architects.

The building was used as a printing plant and had an address of 12 Lafayette Place. The De Vinne Building originally had a loading platform on Lafayette Street that took up about 13.5 feet (4.1 m) of the sidewalk's width. Its machinery included a press that could print 2,500 copies of 64-page magazine every hour, in addition to a turntable where magazine sheets could be placed. The Century and St. Nicholas magazines were printed at the building, along with William Dwight Whitney's Century Dictionary. By 1888, Smith and De Vinne had acquired two additional sites to the east of the existing building, with plans to erect an annex there. The building was expanded between 1890 and 1891. Babb, Cook & Willard designed a seven-story brick-and-terracotta annex at 21–23 East Fourth Street, which was budgeted at $50,000.

By 1897, plans to construct the first line of the New York City Subway under Lafayette Place (now the Lexington Avenue Line) faced opposition from several landowners along that street, including De Vinne & Co. De Vinne's lawyers claimed that the line would require an 8-foot-wide (2.4 m) section of the building's basement vaults to be destroyed, incurring damages of up to $100,000. The subway ultimately opened in 1904. A water tank was built on the building's roof in 1909. Two years later, Walter S. Timmis designed a further renovation of the De Vinne Press Building, which was carried out by F. D. Green & Co. At that time, the building's main entrance and underground vault were renovated to accommodate the subway line and a widening of Lafayette Street. After De Vinne died in February 1914, James Bothwell became the president of the De Vinne Press, while De Vinne's estate took over his stake in the building. The same year, new elevators were installed, and a rooftop bulkhead was also built. Streep & Hill leased one of the building's lofts in 1917.

=== Later years ===
==== De Vinne Press bankruptcy and Peek ownership ====
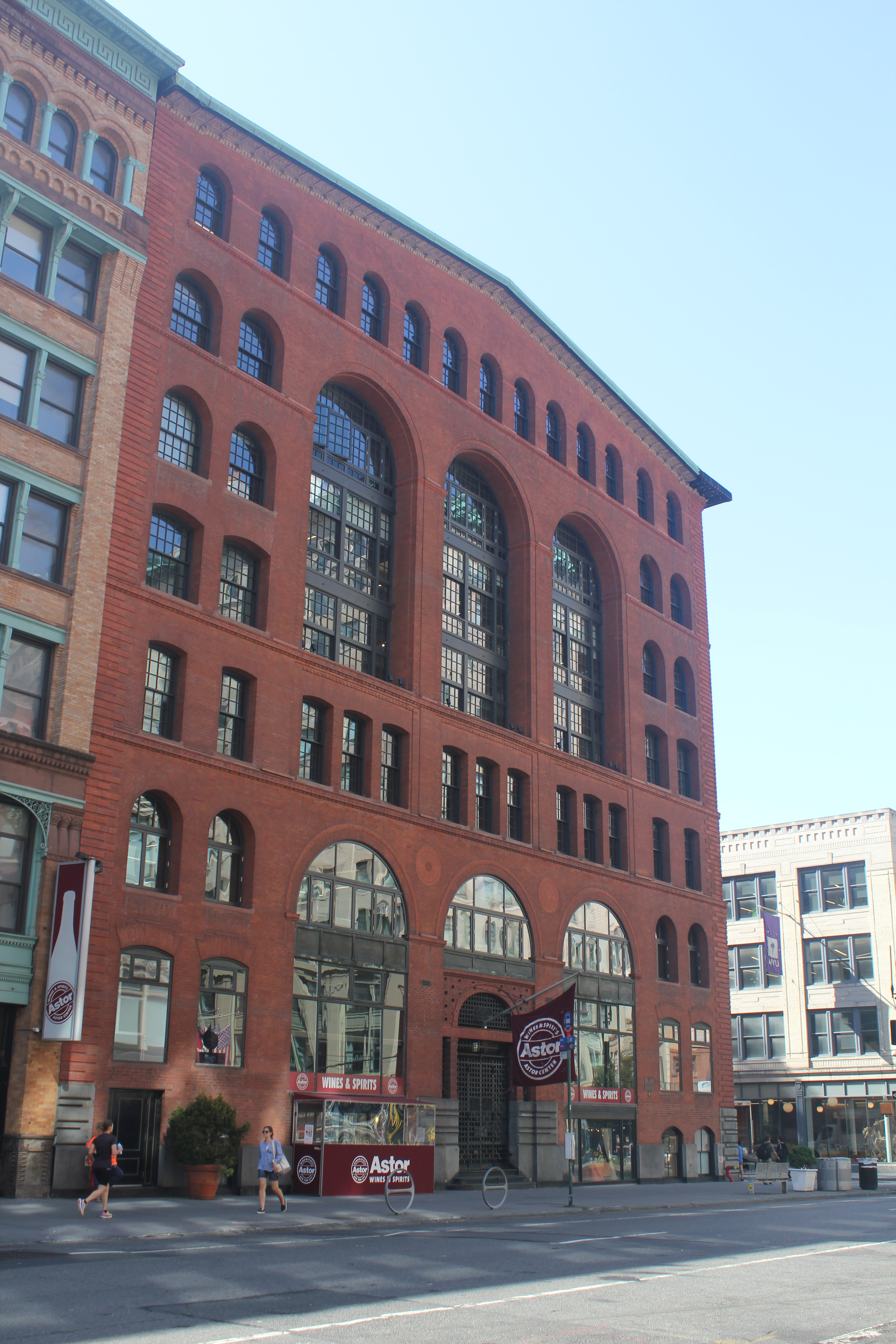
View from Lafayette Street

The De Vinne Press remained in the building until it ceased operations in 1922, citing decreased demand. Valve and hand truck manufacturer Fairbanks Company leased the storefront and two of the upper stories in 1925. Two years later, Charles Schaefer Jr. designed a ramp to the basement, as well as modified the window openings on the first and second stories of the Fourth Street facade. De Vinne and Smith's respective estates continued their joint ownership of the building until 1929, when the Smith estate bought the De Vinne estate's stake in the building. By the 1930s, the tenants included the Reliable Silk Dyeing Company and the American Metal Spinning and Stamping Company. The building also functioned as a metalwork factory in the mid-20th century.

In 1938, the Walter Peek Paper Corporation bought the building from the Manufacturers Trust Company. The Peek Paper Corporation paid $77,500 in cash and took over the building's mortgage; at the time, the property was assessed at $225,000. The new owner planned to renovate the structure. In 1940, the building was internally connected with the neighboring structure at 401 Lafayette Street, and John M. Baker designed a one-story brick annex at the rear. Walter Peek obtained a $17,400 loan for the building from the Harlem Savings Bank in 1947. The De Vinne Press Building continued to function as a printing plant through the late 1960s. The De Vinne Press Building was designated a New York City landmark on November 8, 1966, although the building's owner opposed the designation. The building was added to the National Register of Historic Places in 1977 and to the New York State Register of Historic Places in 1980.

==== Fisher ownership ====
Walter Peek Paper Company sold the building to Edwin Fisher in either 1982 or 1984. This was the second time that the building had ever been sold. Fisher had originally wanted to buy a nearby building on Astor Place, where his family's business, Astor Wines and Spirits, was located. However, Jeffrey Gural, the building owner, had refused to sell the Astor Place building. Fisher's son Andrew had advised him against buying the De Vinne Press Building, since the storefront was in the basement. After Gural rejected Fisher's offer, Fisher agreed to buy the structure from Walter Peek employee Samuel Galewitz, finalizing the agreement while riding an elevator. Fisher subsequently renovated the building, and by the late 1980s, a lighting store had decided to relocate into the building. The vacant ground floor was reserved for Astor Wines and Spirits. Over the years, Fisher gradually made small repairs to the building. The Serafina restaurant opened in the building in late 1999.

By the early 2000s, the architect David Paul Helpern occupied 11,000 square feet (1,000 m^{2}) of the building, while the ground floor was occupied by the Serafina restaurant. In addition, Fisher had hired Vincent Stramandinoli & Associates to restore the cornice for $65,000. Astor Wines and Spirits moved into the De Vinne Press Building in 2006, occupying 11,000 square feet (1,000 m^{2}) there. Andrew Fisher converted the basement's press area into a storefront and used the building's cellar floor as a wine cellar. The store was divided into several sections, each with wine from a different geographical region. The Fishers also planned to build a tasting area and classroom on the second floor; the store and education area were collectively known as the Astor Center. The second-story area became a wine-education center, which opened in 2008. The Astor Center included a cool room, tasting bar, and wine library. To accommodate the Astor Center, the store installed two microturbines in the basement.

The building's tenants in the 2010s included Astor Wines and Spirits, André Balazs Properties, the Orchard (a digital distribution company), the Shootdigital photo studio and production company, and Helpern Architects. In addition, the Taco Bell fast-food chain opened a temporary pop-up restaurant in the building in 2017. During the COVID-19 pandemic in New York City, the education center was closed temporarily.

== Reception ==
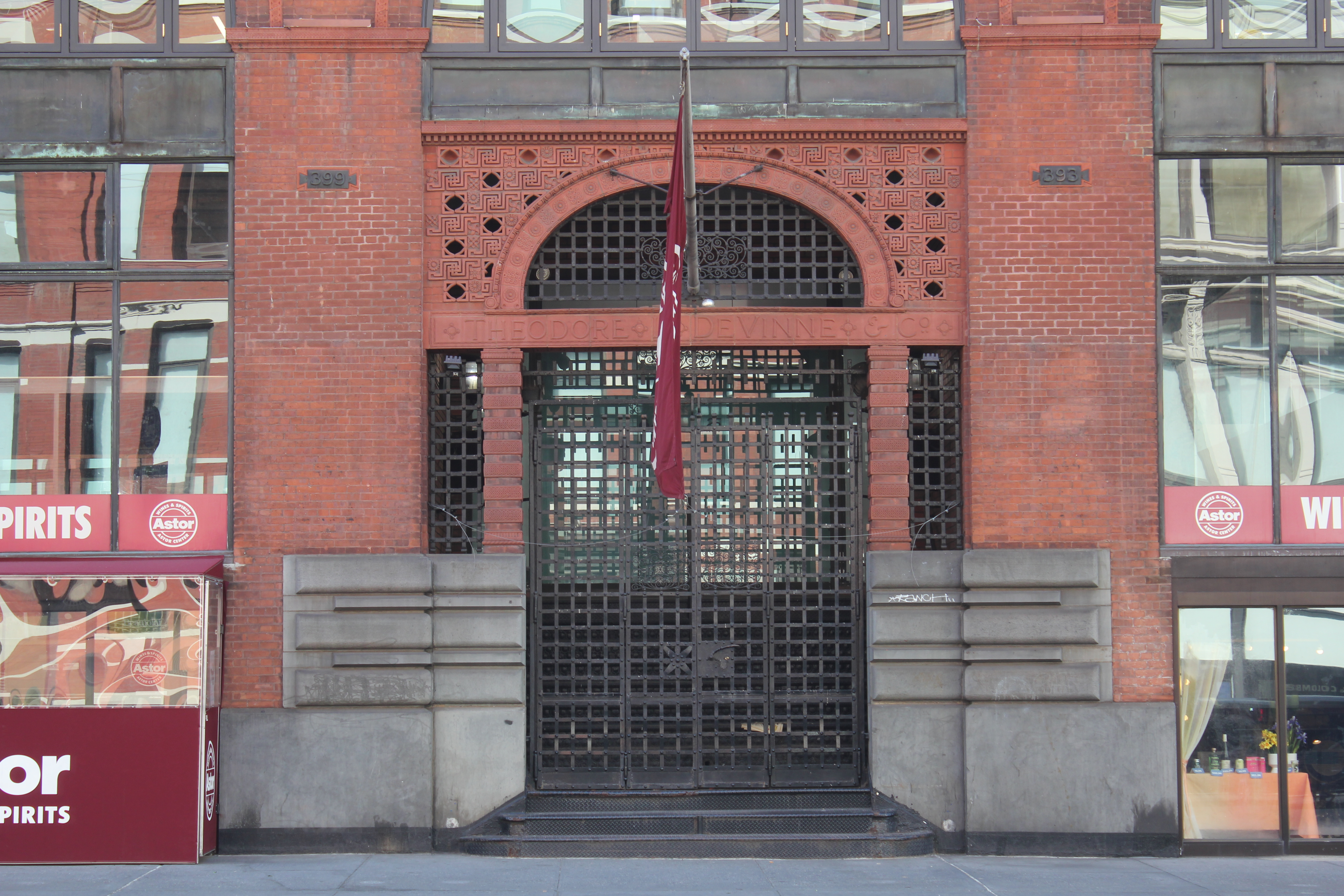
Entrance view

When the structure was completed, the Real Estate Record and Guide described the De Vinne Press Building as "affectedly bald and quaint". The American Architect and Building News wrote in 1899 that the building was designed in an "aqueduct style" in that it included both single-story and multi-story arches. In 1904, the architect and art critic Russell Sturgis said in The Architectural Record that "More than once visitors on their way to see it have been pulled up suddenly by a sudden sense of its large presence." Sturgis specifically praised the ornamentation around the entrance, which he said showed "how ornament may be concentrated at one point, while still serving well the general purpose of the building as a whole". Homer Saint-Gaudens wrote in 1913 that the structure was "so clean-cut and essentially American as to win [the building's architect] instant respect". Albert Kahn wrote in the Architectural Review in 1917 that the De Vinne Press Building was a "very remarkable" structure that preceded a series of "very creditable industrial buildings".

The De Vinne Press Building continued to receive praise in the second half of the 20th century. Lewis Mumford wrote in 1953 that the building was a "fine survivor" from another era, and Henry Hope Reed Jr. characterized the building in 1962 as an imposing "Roman utilitarian" edifice. According to Reed, the use of alternating round and segmental arches of different sizes contributed to the building's monumental appearance, despite the lack of ornamentation otherwise. The writers Sarah Landau and Carl W. Condit wrote that, despite the simple appearance of the facade, the openings were arranged in a "highly sophisticated" manner that reflected the building's use as a printing building. Robert A. M. Stern and the coauthors of his 1999 book New York 1880 wrote that the De Vinne Press Building had a monumental scale despite the relatively simple design.

In 2003, architectural historian Christopher Gray of The New York Times described the building as "among the most sophisticated works of masonry in New York, a tour de force of honestly simple bricklaying built for one of the premier printing companies of a century ago." Another architectural critic, Paul Goldberger, likened the De Vinne Press Building to a New England brick mill and praised it as Babb, Cook & Willard's best design. In a 2005 biography of De Vinne, Irene Tichenor wrote that the De Vinne Press Building had been "one of the finest examples of commercial architecture" at a time when structural-steel frames were still uncommon. The historian Barbaralee Diamonstein-Spielvogel, in a guidebook about New York City designated landmarks, characterized the attic windows as giving the building "a distinctive note".

== See also ==
- List of New York City Designated Landmarks in Manhattan below 14th Street
- National Register of Historic Places listings in Manhattan below 14th Street
