= Theodore Low De Vinne =

American printer and typographer (1828–1914)

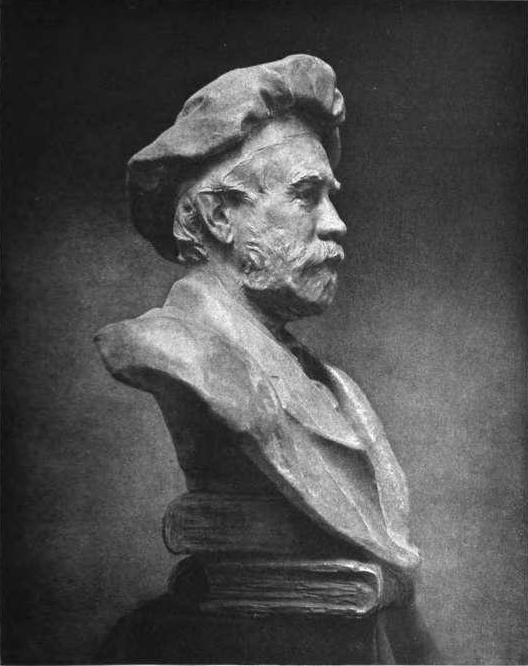
- Bust of Theodore Low De Vinne by Chester Beach
- Born: December 25, 1828; Stamford, Connecticut
- Died: February 16, 1914 (aged 85); New York, NY
- Occupation(s): Printer, typographer
- Employer: De Vinne Press
- Organization: Grolier Club
- Parent(s): Daniel De Vinné and Joanna Augusta Low

Theodore Low De Vinne (December 25, 1828 – February 16, 1914) was an American printer and scholarly author on typography. Considered "the leading commercial printer of his day," De Vinne began the professionalization of American printing, as well as commissioning still-popular typefaces and writing extensively on the practice of his trade.

== Life and career ==
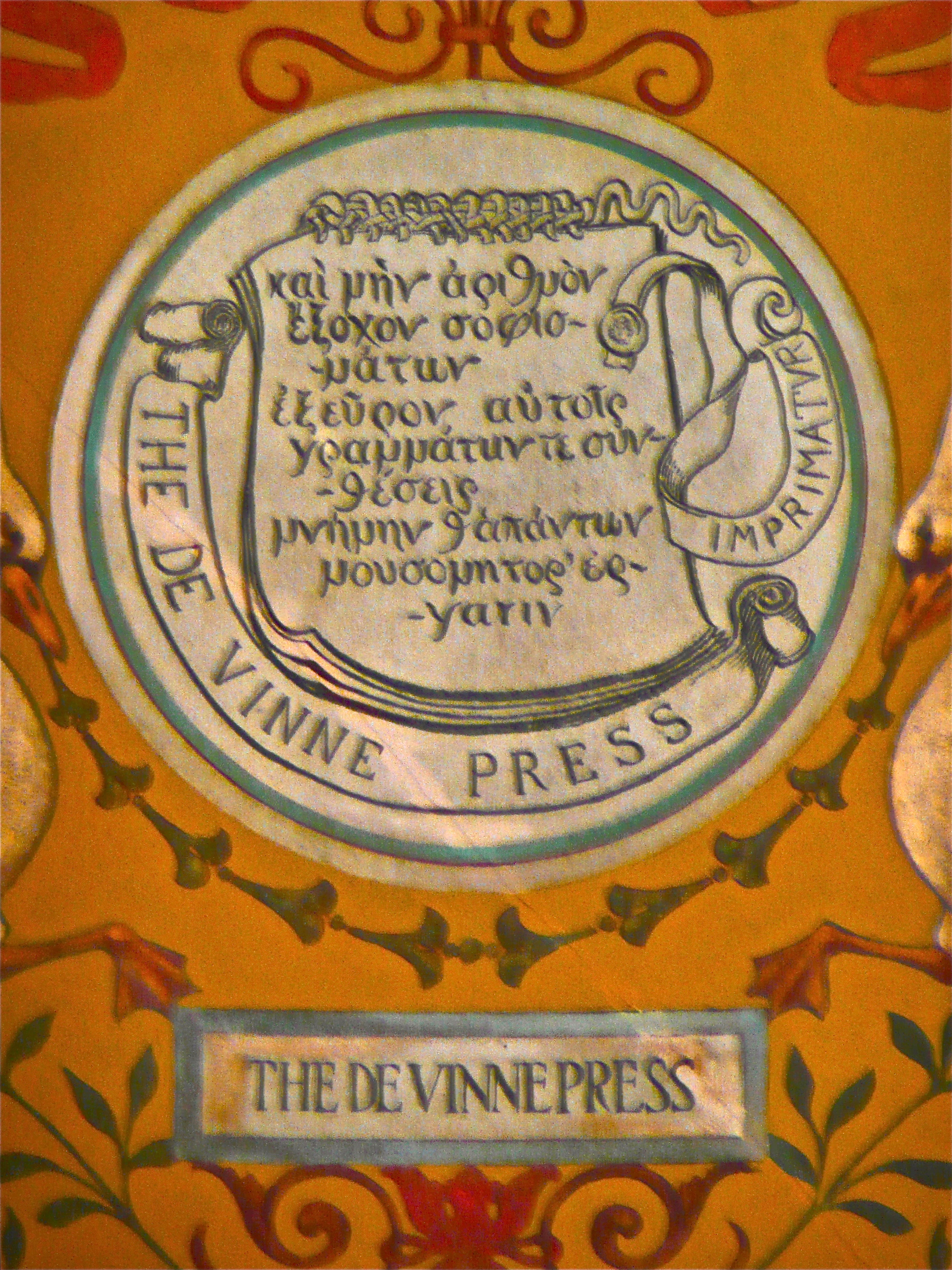
The De Vinne Press printers mark, Thomas Jefferson Building, Library of Congress

De Vinne was born at Stamford, Connecticut, and educated in the common schools of the various towns where his father, an itinerant Methodist minister, had pastorates. He learned the rudiments of printing while employed in a shop at Fishkill, New York. He worked at the Newburgh, New York Gazette, then moved to New York City. In 1850 he was hired as a compositor by the printing shop of Francis Hart in New York, where he rose to the position of foreman within a year, which included duties as shop manager. He became a partner in Hart's business in 1858 and assumed sole proprietorship of the firm upon Hart's death in 1877, eventually renaming it to Theodore L. De Vinne & Co. in 1883.

While still a partner of Hart's, De Vinne managed to steer the business from job printing to the more lucrative and prestigious book and periodical trade, mostly thanks to his excellence in printing wood engravings. De Vinne's commercial success and high repute derived in large measure from the collaboration with his main client in this market segment, The Century Company, for whom he printed the popular St. Nicholas Magazine and The Century Magazine, as well as many books, such as George Kennan's influential Siberia and The Exile System, as well as large multi-volume works such as The Century Dictionary and John Nicolay and John Hay's authoritative biography of Abraham Lincoln.

In 1886, with his business greatly expanded and seeking to increase its printing capacity, he moved the company to the De Vinne Press Building on Lafayette Place, a model plant designed by himself in collaboration with the architects Babb, Cook & Willard. The building was designated a New York City landmark in 1966, and was added to the National Register of Historic Places in 1977.

De Vinne either commissioned Linn Boyd Benton, or co-designed in conjunction with Benton, the still-popular Century Roman typeface for use by The Century Magazine. For use at his own press, he also commissioned Linotype to produce De Vinne, an updated Elzevir (or French Oldstyle) type, and the Bruce Typefoundry to produce Renner, a Venetian face. However, De Vinne's was not closely involved with the design of "De Vinne" and he ultimately was somewhat unhappy with the typeface.

In 1865 De Vinne was a co-founder of the Typothetae, a trade organization of master printers, which was a predecessor of the Printing Industries of America. He was also one of nine men who founded the Grolier Club in 1884, and he was printer to the Club for the first two decades of its existence and designed and printed most of its publications during his lifetime.

== Works ==
De Vinne started his writing career at the age of thirty, as soon as he had become a partner in Hart's printing office. A prolific author in the periodical printing trade press, he also wrote a number of books on the history and practice of printing. His books include:

- The printers' Price List (1871), an item-by-item list of pricing recommendations for job and book printing based on systematic cost accounting, designed to counteract the practice of underbidding among fellow printers.
- The Invention of Printing (1876), an investigation of the claims of Laurens Coster to be inventor of printing with movable type, and awarding the honor to Gutenberg
- Historic Printing Types (1886)
- Plain Printing Types (1900) (The Practice of Typography, vol. 1)
- Correct Composition (1901) (The Practice of Typography, vol. 2), a leading style guide for compositors, proofreaders and authors.
- A Treatise on Title-Pages (1902) (The Practice of Typography, vol. 3), a revision of his earlier Title Pages as seen by a Printer, published by the Grolier Club in 1901.
- Modern Methods of Book Composition (1904) (The Practice of Typography, vol. 4)
- Notable Printers of Italy during the Fifteenth Century (1910)

== See also ==
- De Vinne Press Building
- The Century Company
- The Century Magazine
- Century Dictionary

== Sources ==
- Metcalf, Allan (1996). "Typography". Dictionaries: Journal of the Dictionary Society of North America. 17 (1): 17–28. doi:10.1353/dic.1996.0018. ISSN 2160-5076.
- Tichenor, Irene (2005). No Art Without Craft: The Life of Theodore Low De Vinne, Printer. Boston: David R. Godine. ISBN 978-1-56792-286-8.
