= La Salle Military Academy =

Coordinates: 40°43′48″N 73°07′10″W

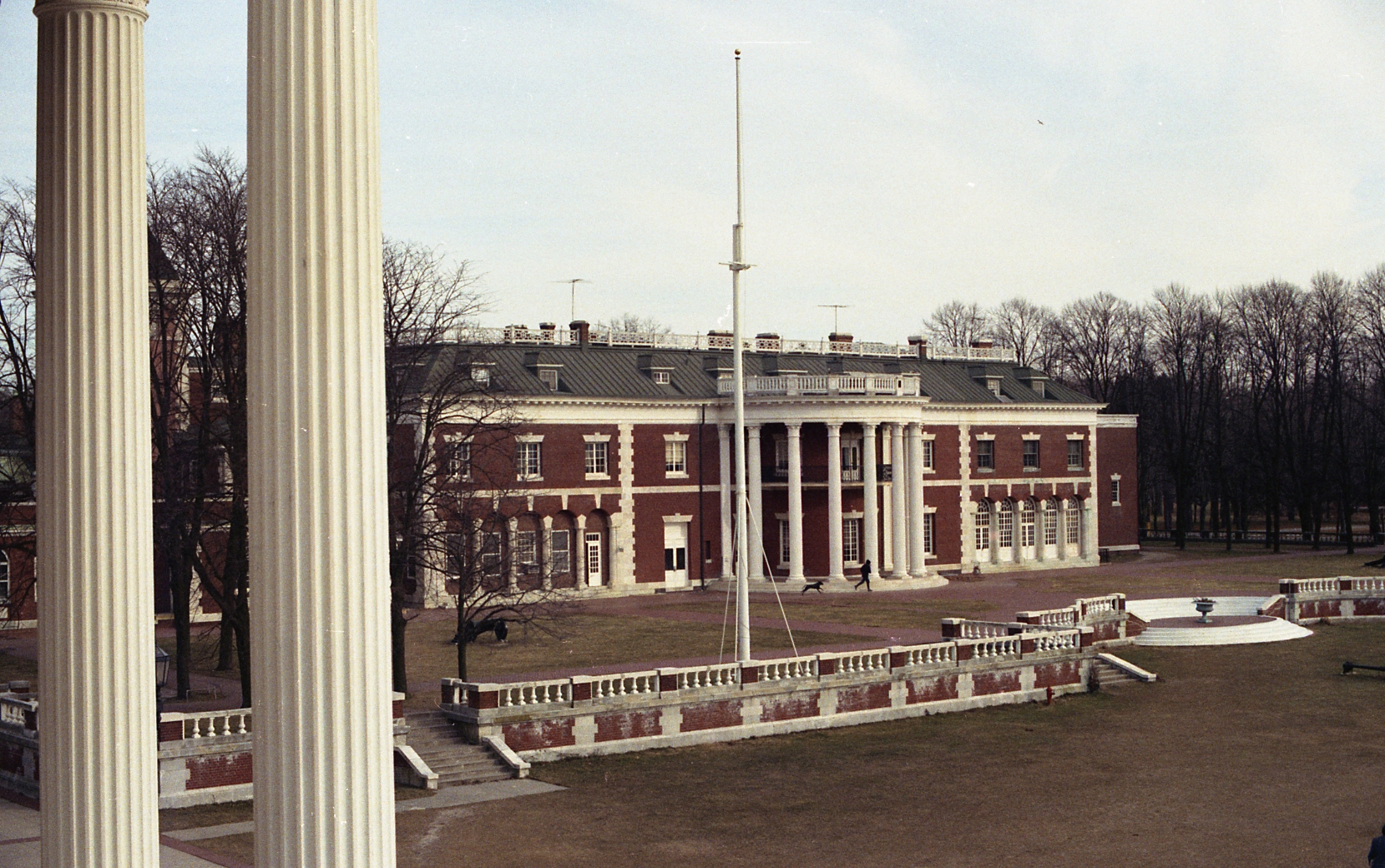
- The Esplanade, Bourne Mansion and Parade Field as seen from St. Joseph's Hall

Location
- 500 Montauk Highway; Oakdale, Suffolk County, New York 11769; United States

Information
- Former names: Westchester Institute; Clason Point Military Academy
- Type: Private, Roman Catholic school (Lasallian,) Military, Day & Boarding
- Religious affiliations: Roman Catholic (Lasallians)
- Established: 1883 (as Westchester Institute)
- Closed: 2001
- Grades: PK–12
- Colors: Blue (Loyalty); White (Honor)
- Athletics conference: CHSAA
- Team name: "Kaydets;" later "Blue Knights"
- Newspaper: The Marksman
- Yearbook: The Sabre
- previous location: Clason Point, in The Bronx

La Salle Military Academy, later known as La Salle Center, was a Catholic school with middle school/junior high school and high school divisions located in Oakdale, New York. It closed in 2001, and the school's extensive campus was later owned by St. John's University, located in Jamaica, Queens.

== History ==
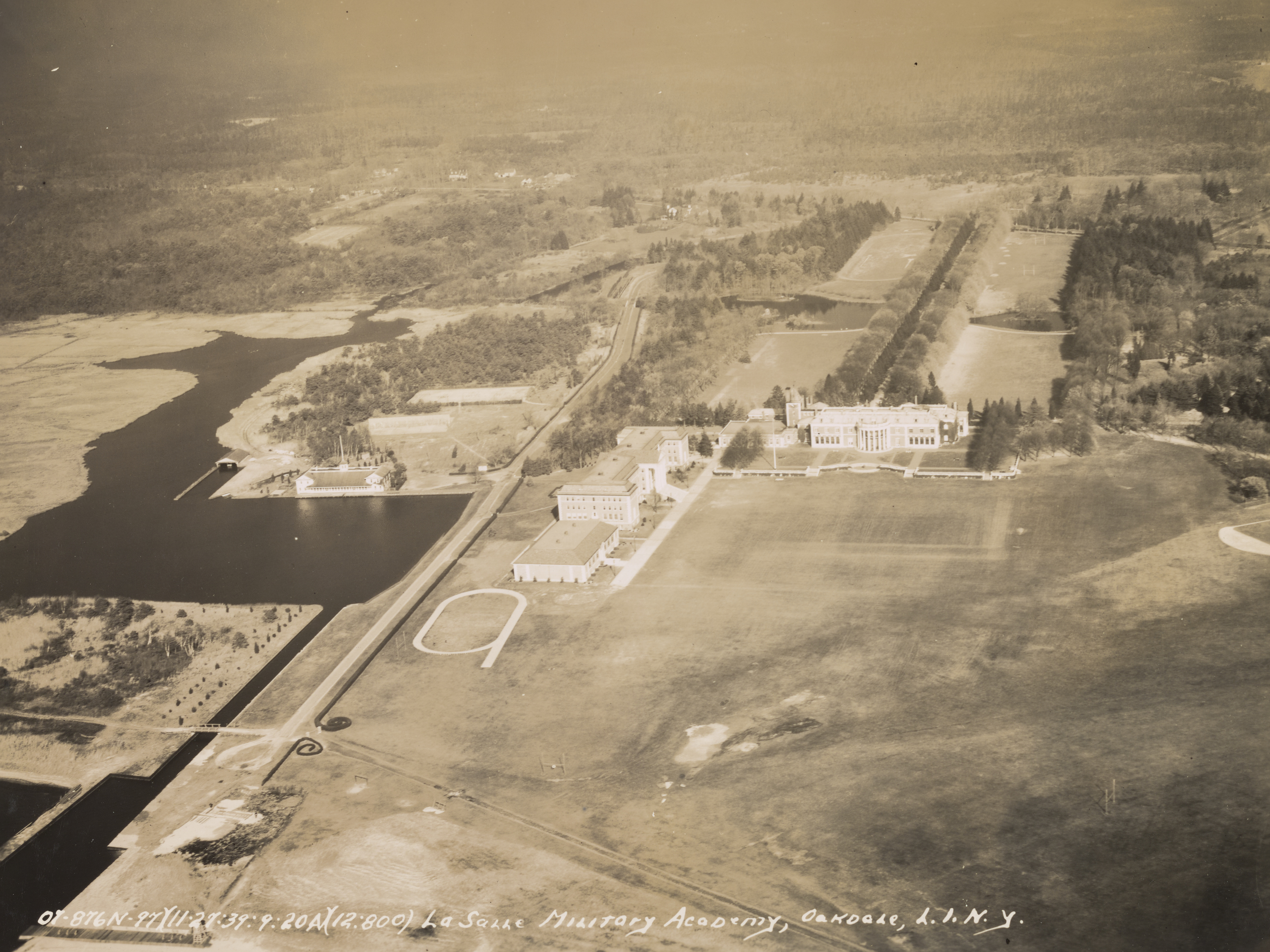
Aerial view of the academy, 1930

La Salle Military Academy was founded by the Institute of the Brothers of the Christian Schools, or "Christian Brothers" (sometimes called the "De La Salle Brothers," having been founded by St. Jean-Baptiste de la Salle in France in the 17th century as an organization of Catholic men under vows dedicated to teaching; the term "De La Salle" brothers distinguishes them from the Irish Congregation of Christian Brothers and other, similarly named and purposed groups).

The school was actually founded in Westchester, New York in 1883 as Westchester Institute. Soon thereafter, the school relocated to Clason Point in Bronx, New York, and was renamed Clason Point Military Academy. In 1926, the school purchased the estate of Frederick Gilbert Bourne, of the Singer sewing machine company, which featured a 110-room mansion, Indian Neck Hall, overlooking Great South Bay, Long Island.

The school had extensive boarding facilities and attracted many sons of the wealthiest Catholic families in the northeastern United States. It also attracted a strong international contingent, particularly from Latin America. For many years LSMA was considered one of the top preparatory schools on the East Coast. It was accredited by the Middle States Association of Colleges and Schools. Its academics were held in the highest regard and although LSMA did not require its students to take Regents Examinations, they never found this to be an issue. LSMA's reputation was such that its graduates were consistently admitted to the best colleges. Graduating classes were often 100% college-bound.

Another academic benefit of not being a Regents program was that the faculty were not bound by a rigid curriculum, which widened the school's latitudes when it came to classes. This benefited the day-to-day education that took place there. For example, in English classes students would often read books that would never have been permitted in a Public School setting (e.g. Kurt Vonnegut, Evelyn Waugh, Bernard Malamud). Honors-track students were often able to take college-level courses (curriculum-wise). LSMA offered some very advanced math and history classes, as well as Marine Biology.

In 1993 it began a non-military program for students. It began admitting girls as well as non-military students. It changed its name from "La Salle Military Academy" to "La Salle Center." The JROTC Military was made optional, and so cadets attended classes side-by-side with non-military, "Prep" students. By the time the school closed, only a fraction of its students participated in the Military program. It also began extending its classes into the Middle School and later into the Elementary grades.

In 1997 the school had 525 students, its highest ever enrollment.

In 1999 St. Johns University spent $14,300,000 to purchase the former campus. The school continued operations at the time, and the university leased the building to the school.

By 2001 the number of students had decreased, down to 266. Dennis Cronin, the headmaster, stated that boarding schools were no longer as popular, and that other Catholic schools had attracted students away. In February 2001, the board of trustees stated that the institution would close effective June 30 that year.

In 2016, St. Johns sold the campus to Amity University.

== Academic and JROTC programs ==
The Christian Brothers administered the academic program, while the military program was run by the United States Army in close coordination with the Christian Brothers. La Salle was consistently rated in the top ten military high schools in the country. As a "Junior ROTC Honor School with Distinction," the school could actually make nominations to the service academies. The school maintained this status until it closed its doors in 2001. Another benefit of this status was that the Army assigned active duty personnel to conduct Military training. This was led by a command-rank officer (usually a Colonel or a Major), who served as the school's SAI (Senior Army Instructor). The rest of the team was made up of NCO's (non-commissioned officers, i.e. sergeants). Many of these NCOs were professional drill instructors. For many of these Army personnel, LSMA was their last stop before retirement.

== Campus ==
Perhaps the most distinguishing feature of LSMA was its magnificent campus. In the Sixties and Seventies the campus was 200-plus acres, though later classes may remember the campus being smaller. Older alumni may remember that the West Sayville County Golf Course adjacent to the campus had once actually been part of the campus in the 1920s and 1930s.

=== Bourne Mansion ===
Indian Neck Hall, the "Bourne Mansion", housed the school's Admissions and Finance offices. The old servants' quarters on the upper floors housed the Christian Brothers on the Second Floor, and the Third Floor was converted to student housing. It also had sitting rooms for students to visit with parents and sometimes girlfriends as well. The ornate old ballroom of the mansion was converted into the school chapel during the La Salle years. In the summer of 1976, Brother Roger Chingas led a group of students in dismantling an Opus One pipe organ which was about to be destroyed in a church in Albany NY. Brother Roger then oversaw the restoration of the pipe organ piece by piece in the Chapel where it remains today. For a period of time, the chapel was converted into a catering facility by the Lessings. Today it has been reverted to its original purpose.

There was an abundance of school lore about the old mansion. For instance, there was a long-abandoned swimming pool in the basement. School legend had it that it had been shut down after Commodore Bourne's son had drowned in it. According to legend, Commodore Bourne was distraught over his son's drowning and sold the mansion to the Christian Brothers for $1 with the agreement that his son's portrait would never be moved from the mansion's main parlor room, and the swimming pool would never be used again. Other school legends pertained to secret passages inside the Mansion. Legend also had it that there was a tunnel that ran from the "Esplanade," a raised brick veranda on the south side of the Mansion, to the Horse Stables, 1/2 mile East of the mansion.

=== The Esplanade ===
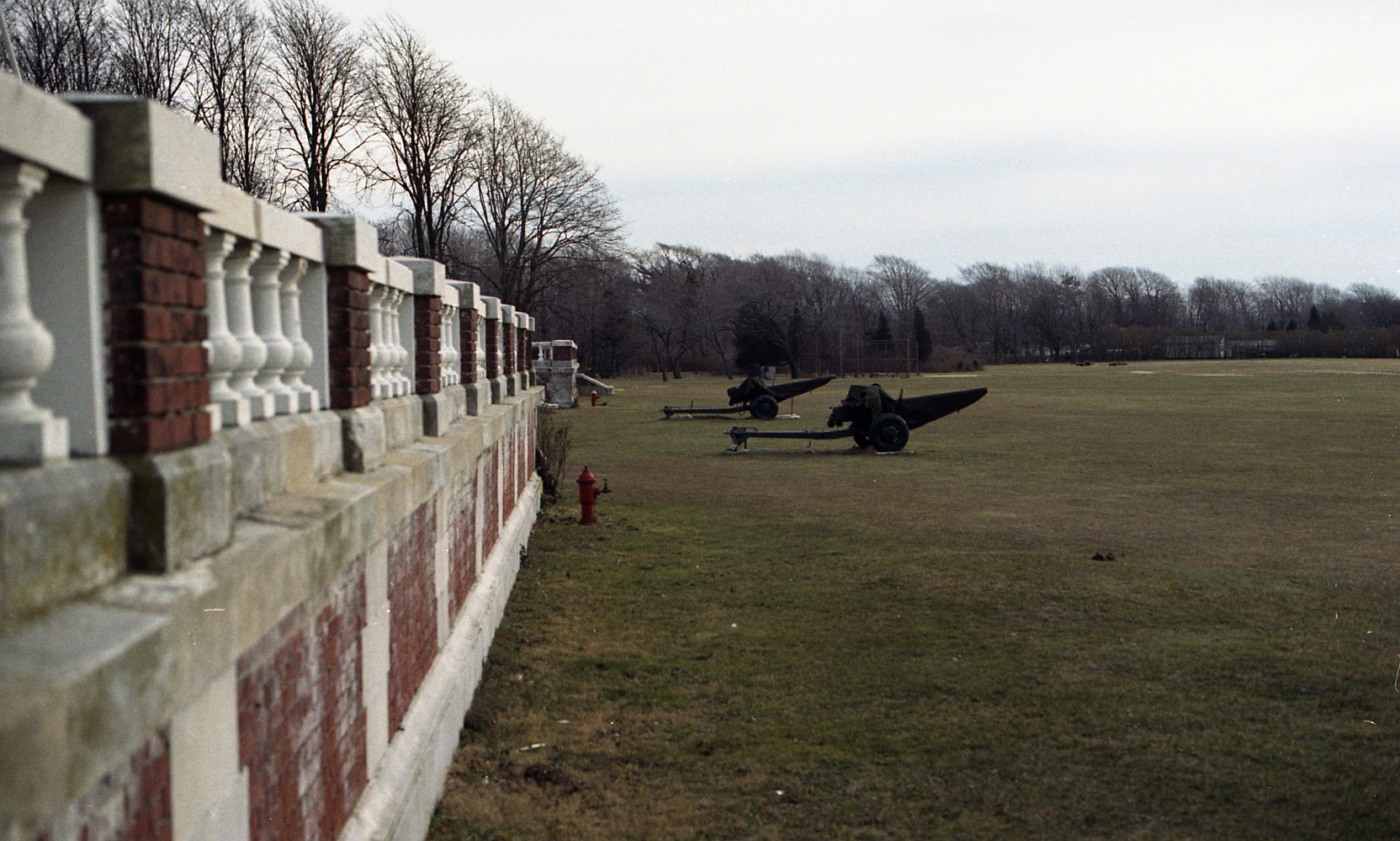
The Esplanade

Esplanade veranda provided a scenic view of the vast Parade Field and the Great South Bay beyond. Cadet parades of the several-hundred-strong Cadet Corps were reviewed from this vantage point. Sometimes the cadets wore "Full Dress" uniforms with brass buttons and breastplates, sashes, gold brocade, and medals. During much of the school's existence, LSMA uniforms were made and tailored by Brooks Brothers in Manhattan.

=== The Boathouse ===
Boat House was another vestige of the old estate, which was alongside a boat basin that emptied into the Great South Bay. During most of the Academy's history, it housed the theater where plays and shows were produced by the cadets, however in 1983, the Boat House was given an upgrade and was converted to a café style game facility at the same time that Centennial Hall was built. Centennial Hall became the center for the arts. From 1983 to 98 the boat house was converted to a game hall with pool tables, TV's, pinball machines and arcade games. It also housed a small kitchen where students could order and pay for meals not part of the school lunch program. Later it was damaged by storms and rendered unusable. It is currently boarded up and abandoned.

=== St. Joseph's Hall & Senior Steps ===
The Senior Steps and St. Joseph's Hall

St. Joseph's Hall, a massive four-story building that was taller than anything else for miles provided the main cadet residence. It was one of the biggest structures along the Great South Bay shoreline and remains so to this day. The basement floor contained, classrooms, along with the athletic locker rooms, a barber and the gymnasium in an adjacent structure. Another important area of the basement was the rifle racks of the various companies. Each company was assigned its own rifle rack. As a JROTC Honor School, the U.S. Military provided rifles for drilling purposes (no firing pins) and each cadet was issued a rifle. The active Military staff took security for these weapons very seriously and the FBI was summoned if any were found missing, although that rarely happened.

In addition to being the main classroom floor, the Second Floor of St. Joseph's Hall contained Administrative offices such as the Dean of Studies, the Commandant, the Guidance Office, etc. The east side of the building was distinguished by a massive white marble staircase. This staircase was commonly known amongst the cadets as the "Senior Steps" because school rules forbade underclassmen to stand or walk on them. Transgressions by underclassmen were punished by being forced to clean them with a mop or scrub brushes, depending on how strict the senior class felt like being. School legend had it that some violators were even made to scrub it with a toothbrush!

The third and fourth floors of St. Joseph's were residence areas for cadets. The Third Floor housed "A" and "B" Companies; the Fourth Floor housed "C" and "D" Companies. (A fifth Company, "E" Company, was housed in the residence area in the third floor of the Mansion.) There were no elevators in any of the LSMA buildings, so cadets would have to climb quite a few steps during the course of the day. The building also had an attic with a high ceiling which could have been made into additional space had the school been so inclined. As it was, it was used for storage.

=== Molloy Hall ===
Molloy Hall

The seniors were all housed in a building separate from the underclassmen called Molloy Hall. It leveraged some lovely features of the old estate such as a kayak house on the stream adjoining it and a rose trellis. The trellis has since rotted away, with only a single section and concrete footings remaining. Similarly, the kayak house disintegrated and only the concrete base remains. Seniors were housed two to a room, as opposed to between four, six and eight cadets to a room for underclassmen. If both roommates smoked, smoking was permitted in the room although LSMA later became a "non-smoking campus." Also, seniors were the only cadets who were permitted to have cars on campus and parking spaces behind Molloy Hall facilitated this.

=== Centennial Hall ===
Centennial Hall built during the early 1980s, and dedicated in 1983, became the school's main auditorium. The building housed the Music Department and the Living Theatre program. The Living Theatre program performed three shows annually with first year shows being directed by Bro Michael McDonald, and Bill Ballantyne who went on to be director of the Living Theatre program until 1987. It housed the LSMA music department, and was also home to outside performing groups. It housed a small instrument repair room and the Drum and Bugle Corps would often use the music department to practice during drill when they were not out marching and practicing trick moves. At one time it was even used to stage Oldies Rock and Roll shows. The building also served as a graduation space when the weather didn't cooperate. It currently houses "Kids for Kids Productions," a non-profit children's drama group.

=== "Pete's Island" ===
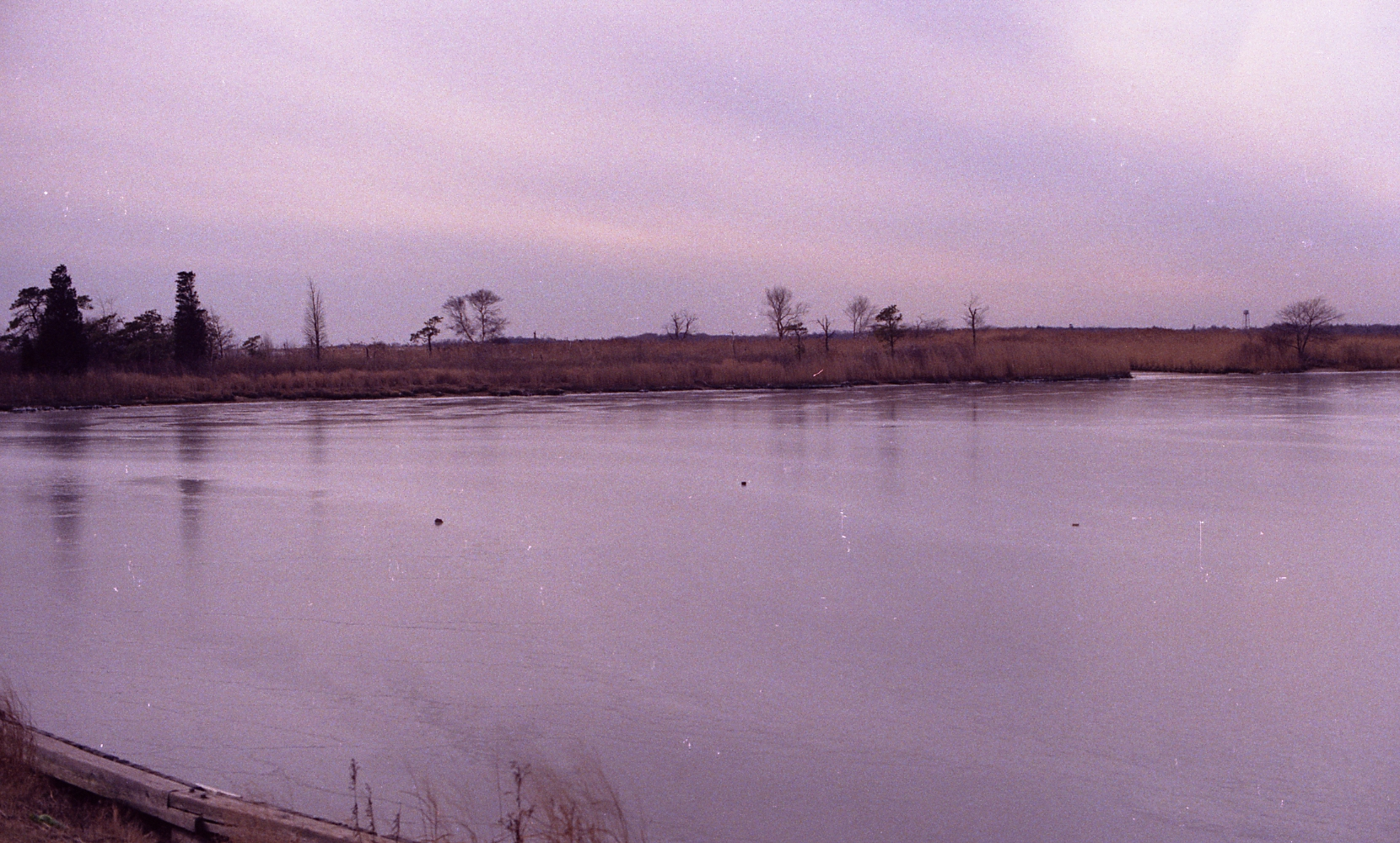
Pete's Island

"Pete's Island" is a large parcel of undeveloped salt marsh directly to the west of the boat basin, which can only be accessed over a single wood bridge. This open shore front area of about 100 acres is designated by the State as "Protected Wetlands Habitat" including "Ludlow's creek." This means the land cannot be developed as long as it retains that status. The reference "Pete's Island" was for Brother Azarius Peter (Brother Pete,) who focused on grounds maintenance and sometimes dumped organic waste (leaves, branches, etc...) there with his truck. Cadets with too many demerits were required to work with Brother Peter after school hours. Although a fascinating place to explore nature, Pete's Island was a designated "out of bounds" area for cadets. However, cadets did sometimes go there on field trips for their Marine Biology classes.

== Cadet life ==
At LSMA, as in many military academies, the ranking cadets operated most of the schools military operations. Cadet officers and NCOs were responsible for the conduct and performance of fellow cadets. Underclassmen were expected to follow the orders of upperclassmen. During weekends, for cadets that remained at the school, a cadet officer was appointed as officer of the Day and would be responsible for taking attendance counts, responding to sick cadets and ensuring that military life was kept during weekends. During the week, NCOs were appointed as the CQ for the day. During that time, the cadet would miss classes and would operate collecting reports and ensuring all had what they needed for the day. These cadets were still held responsible for what was covered in their classes, so CQ was a tough assignment. The goal of the program was to instill leadership, problem solving abilities and responsibility into every cadet.

As in many military institutions, life at LSMA was very structured and rigorous, with a cadet's days very tightly scheduled. A typical day began at 6:15AM with Reveille and hall formation when a head-count was performed and the "floor prefect" (a Brother aka "monk") would read the daily notices, followed by 1/2 hour for bathroom, dressing and bed making (the bed had to be made with "hospital corners" and have a flipped coin bounce when striking the blanket). Then at 6:45AM formation on Company Street, the concrete street on the East side of St. Joseph's Hall. The cadets marched off to breakfast in their daily uniforms. After breakfast, inspection was held. Cadets were in uniform and with their issued rifle, an M-1903A3, for the drill team and M1 Garand Rifle for other cadets, clean-shaven (for those old enough to shave);, shoes and brass shined. Any deficiency gained the cadet "demerits," and an accumulation of twenty or more meant the cadet had to "march post duty" on Saturday morning and lose any pre-planned chance to go home or visit to another cadet's home (note: all visits [even home] required written permission from the cadets parent(s); a cadet going to another cadet's home required written permission from both sets of parent(s)).

After inspection, the cadets attended classes much the same as in any school. La Salle justly had a reputation as a top-notch school academically. Many cadets reported that their first and second years of college were a rehash of the classes they had at LSMA. At various times the school offered advanced college-level classes to students as young as tenth grade. Honors students even studied Calculus and Marine Biology. The LSMA campus, on the shore of the Great South Bay and adjacent to protected marshlands, provided an ideal environment for such studies.

After classes ended the cadets formed on the parade field for drill. Cadets drilled as squads, platoons and companies at various times. Competitions were held, with awards given by the Military Staff to the best drillers. Another very competitive area was Manual of Arms, with competitions among the Cadet Corps at large as well as the elite La Salle Rifles drill team who went on to win National Championships in both 1983 and 1984. The Drum and Bugle Corps began drilling in their music space in Centennial Hall during this time or would be seen marching around campus to perfect their drill formations.

After drill time, there was "free time," which for most cadets meant either practice for their sports teams or intramural sports. Cadets were only allowed one free afternoon per week. All other days had to be filled with an activity, club or sport. There were Baseball, Football, Tennis, Cross Country, Winter Track, Spring Track, Basketball and Soccer teams. The school had a robust rifle team as well as a number of clubs and activities. Because LSMA was in the Catholic league with Diocesan high schools ten times its size, it was often tough to be competitive. However, LSMA did prevail for several championships. With so many Latin students, they often fielded a good Soccer and baseball teams. Their Speech and Debate team was a perennial powerhouse as well.

After free time, the Cadets changed back to uniforms for evening formation. During this time, the flag was lowered with all its due ceremony and the Cadet Corps marched off to dinner. The Mess Hall was located next to the infirmary. Once inside, seating arrangements were made by company. Cadets were expected to remain at attention until all prayer and announcements were given. After dinner, there was a 30 minute period to get ready for study time. At approximately 7:30PM, study periods began. These were two hours where students had to sit at their desks (no bathroom break) not true, we were allowed bathroom breaks and were expected to study their academics (floor monitors would see to this). Taps was at 10:00 PM and 11:00 PM for Seniors.

=== Plebe system ===
Adjusting to at a new school is difficult enough for most kids, but new entrants to La Salle faced their own unique set of challenges. They had to complete the "Plebe System," a rigorous program of training modeled after the one used at the U.S. Military Academy at West Point. The term was an abbreviation of the Latin word "Plebeian," which generally indicted a "common" person or one of lower class. Plebes were reminded on a daily basis that they were "The lowest form of life on Earth." They were badgered and quizzed by the upperclassmen, and usually there were a lot of pushups as well. The presumed purpose was twofold: to Administrative purpose of acclimating the new student to life at the Academy, and the deeper Military purpose of teaching the new cadet how to function in high-pressure situations.

All new cadets were required to graduate the Plebe System. Plebes were generally freshmen but sometimes were sophomores or even juniors. Herein are some of the requirements:

Plebe Knowledge - Information about the Academy was posted daily, which each plebe was expected to know. All upperclassmen had the right to quiz any plebe on the day's knowledge or that of any previous day, and exercised that right liberally. Plebe knowledge might include the names of the Battalion Staff, key members of the Faculty and Military Staff or factoids about the school's history such the year it was founded. Plebes were also expected to know the school song, "Hail Alma Mater Fair," and be able to sing it on demand. It's a pretty good bet that most LSMA graduates still can.

Running/Squaring Corners - Plebes were required to wear combat boots instead of shoes during the day. Whenever they were outdoors on campus, they were expected to run to wherever they were headed. LSMA having such an expansive campus, this could be tough on plebes who were not athletically inclined. A plebe who was not moving sufficiently fast was likely to have "RUN PLEBE!" shouted at him by upperclassmen. Plebes had to run on the walkways and were not allowed to walk on the grass. Furthermore, whenever the plebe had to make a turn they were expected to stop, make a proper right-face or left face, and continue on their way. This practice was known as "Squaring the Corners."

Bracing - Probably every plebe's least-favorite thing was having to "brace." Whenever standing in formation, plebes were required to "Military brace." This consisted of using one's neck to press the chin against the collarbone, producing pleats in the flesh under the chin. Obviously, some of the more corpulent plebes found this easier than others, but for most plebes bracing was quite literally a "pain in the neck." Even worse, the upperclassmen would shout things like, "CHINS! I WANNA SEE CHINS!"

Military brace has also caused Erb's palsy in Military School cadets.

Graduation of the Freshman Class - Provided the Battalion Staff and the Military Staff were satisfied that sufficient progress by the incoming class, Plebes "graduated" to being freshmen (or whichever class they were entering) on Father's Day in October. As cited elsewhere, Father's Day fell after the end of the school year so LSMA celebrated it in October. This was the new students' first experience parading with the Cadet Corps and a "coming out" of sorts. Seniors, meanwhile, came forward to receive their senior pins.

=== Demerit System - Post Duty/"Hunyak" Duty ===
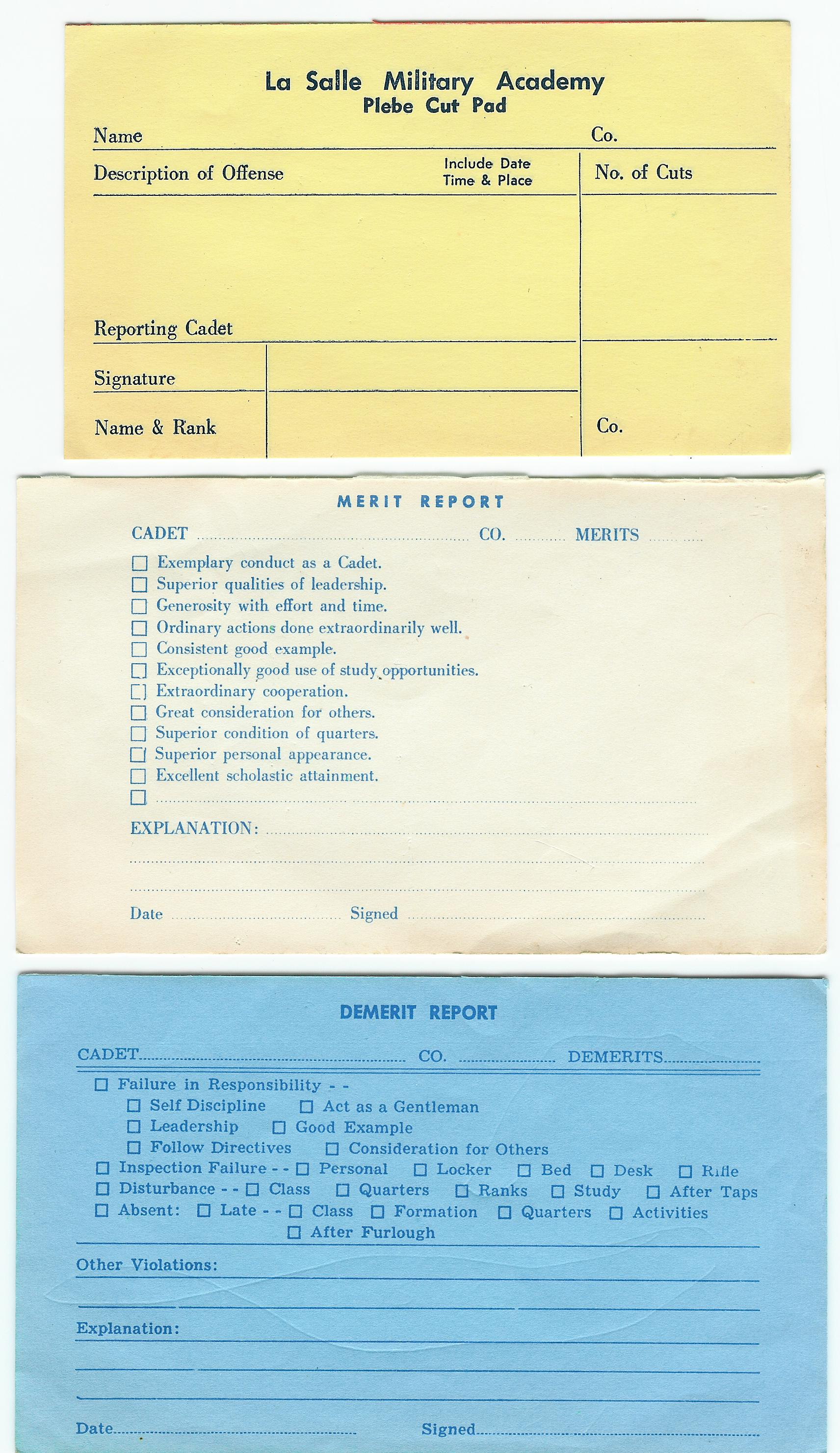
Plebe Cut, Merit & Demerit Pads

Cadets worked on a "Demerit System" in their daily activities in the JROTC program. Demerits were typically issued during personal and room inspections when deficiencies were found. Sometimes they were issued for failing to report for formations or lateness. Other times they were issued for insubordination, failing to follow orders or wisecracks. Accumulation of 20 or more demerits for lower classmen and 15 for upperclassmen on a given week resulted in "Post Duty" which was not standing guard as was required in the regular Military. For LSMA cadets, "Post Duty" meant marching with a rifle on Company Street beginning on a Friday Afternoon and for some, extending to Saturday morning when most of the other cadets had either gone home for a special weekend furlough, or began the day of "free time". Other times in lieu of marching Post Duty, cadets were required to do "Hunyak Duty." (The term "Hunyak" was cadet slang for the groundskeepers.) This meant the offending cadet was made to do work maintaining the Academy grounds such as raking leaves, cleaning up litter, emptying trash bins, etc. Fortunately, an excess of demerits could be offset by the accumulation of "Merits," which were usually awarded for excellence in drill or inspections, or for doing favors for upperclassmen and sometimes Faculty members.

=== Athletics ===
Although La Salle was very competitive in the 1940s and '50s and even into the 1960s, by the 1970s it was at a very distinct disadvantage. With a student body of roughly 400 students it competed with diocesan and other religious order-sponsored schools which boasted over double the number of students. Still, LSMA managed to field some winning teams. In the 1961 CHSAA Indoor Championships at Madison Square Garden, senior Joseph Lynch, won the inaugural 2 mile run and set the national indoor record. The 1966 Varsity Football team was undefeated, and the 1970-71 Freshman Winter Track team won a league championship as well. In the 1970s La Salle fielded an excellent soccer team, largely composed of Latin students who grew up playing the game. The 1980 Boys Soccer team won the Suffolk County Class C Championship.

=== Company Street and the Senior Steps ===
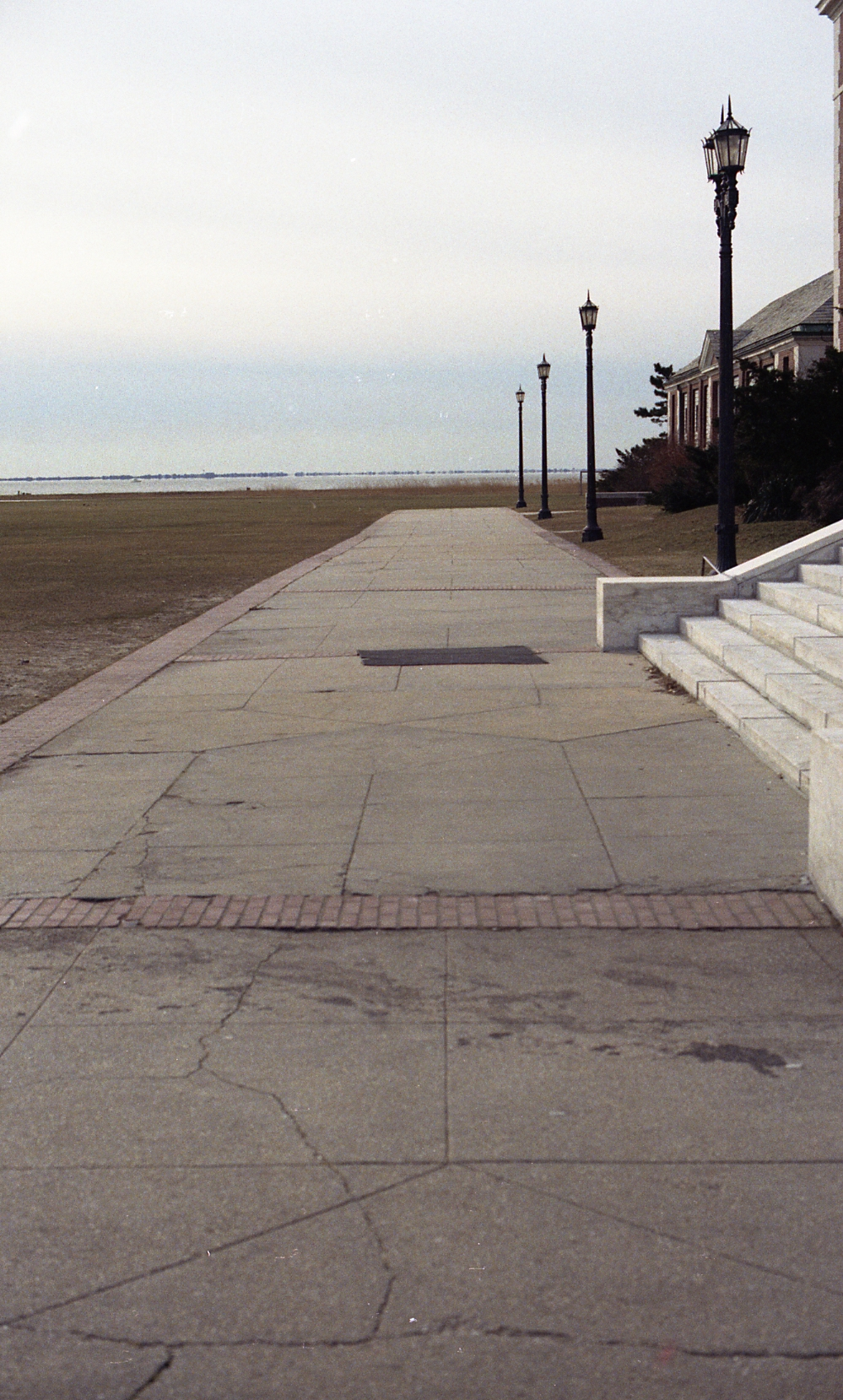
Company Street

Company Street was the concrete road that adjoined the East side of St. Joseph's Hall. This was the center of cadet military life. All morning, mid-day (lunch) and evening formations took place on Company Street, as well as formations for afternoon drill. Daily personal inspections were also held on Company Street. During the winter, which could get pretty cold, the cadets would sometimes, but rarely, muster in the basement of St. Joseph's Hall. This was at the discretion of the cadet Battalion/Regimental Commander and the Military staff.

The Senior steps were a set of marble steps set on the east side of St. Joseph's Hall. These steps were off limits to all but seniors. underclassmen were often berated if they were caught on the Senior Steps and would often have to serve Post Duty for habitual offenses.

During parades for guests, the Cadet Corps would muster on the West side of St. Joseph's, so they could be seen coming around the south end of the building. It made for a more impressive entrance when viewed from the Esplanade.

=== Cadet Parades ===
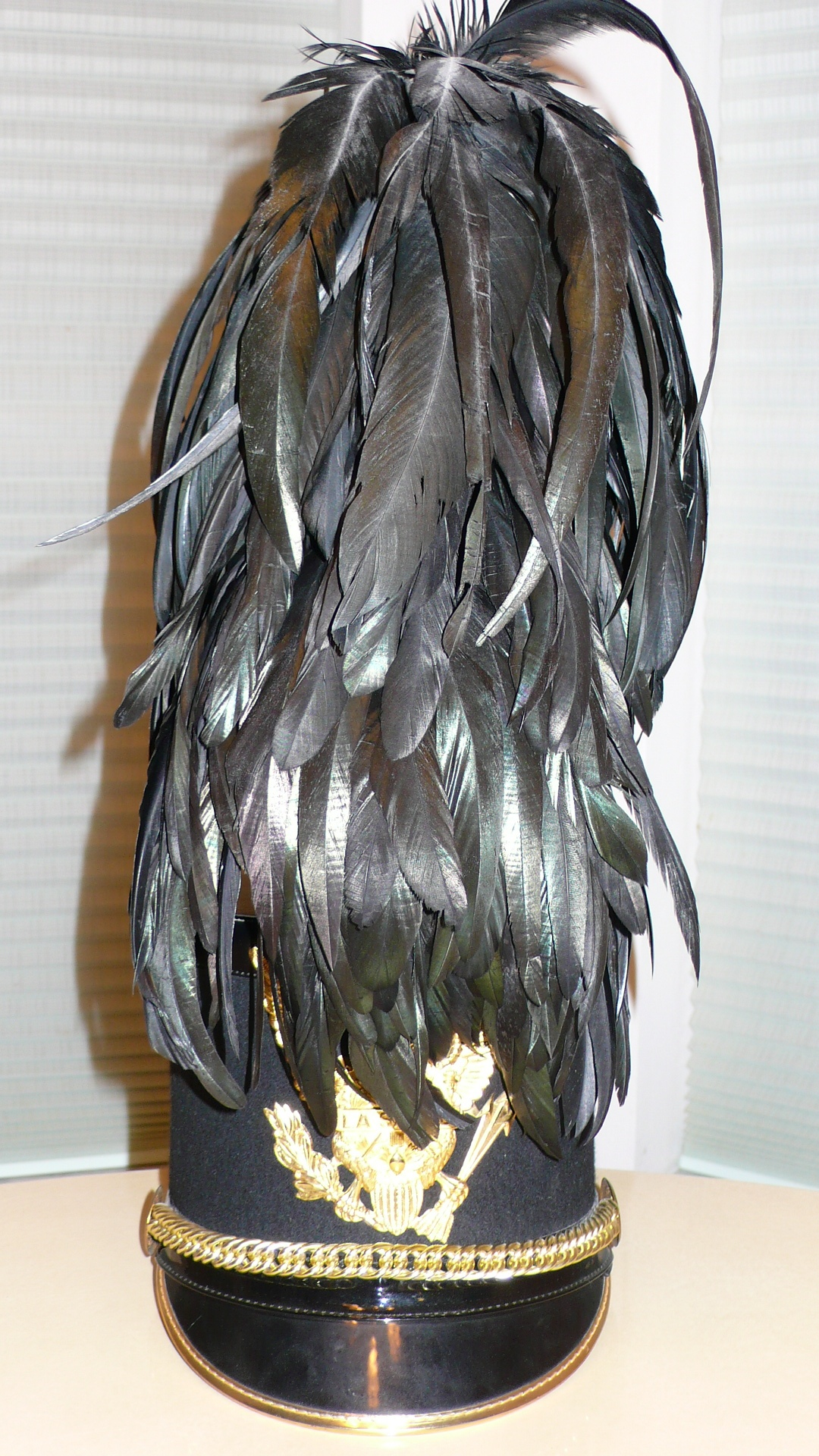
Cadet Shako Dress Hat with Officers Plume

The Cadet Corps had several regularly scheduled parades during the school year. Every parade was a military function and followed the US Army's FM-22-5 manual for parades and ceremonies. The following are a description of several annual activities:

Month	Day	Description
October	Father's Day	Since Father's Day fell after the school year ended, LSMA celebrated it in October. Seniors were given their Senior Pins by their fathers and for those cadets that became cadet officers, their fathers would also present to them their sabres or a sword was presented for the Cadet Sergeant Major. It was also traditionally the end of the "Plebe" period for Freshmen. Plebes would be welcomed into the Cadet Corps as freshmen.
April	I.G. Day	Every year the Inspector General's office of the regular army would send an inspection team to check the LSMA campus and cadets. This was required for the school the maintain its "JROTC Honor School with Distinction" status. The activities always included the Cadet Corps parading for the inspectors. As far as the Military Program was concerned, this was the biggest day of the year. As described earlier, with the Service Academy nominations and the Military personnel the Army provided in the balance, there was a lot at stake.
May	Mother's Day	The mothers of the cadets would present members of the Junior class with their senior rings.
May	Summer Drill Day	Generally this was the second-biggest day of the year. Cadets and Faculty invited their friends and relatives to come to this day of demonstrations by the cadet corps. The various companies competed for the Clason Point Trophy to the unit who scored the highest in points. There were military demonstrations, drill contests and military displays. The regular Army would lend vehicles like tanks and helicopters for viewing and sometimes riding by guests. The afternoon would end with the Cadet Corps "passing in review" (parading).
June	Graduation Day	The graduating class would lead the Cadet Corps for the final time. When the Corps was on the Parade Field the Captain Adjutant would order, "SENIORS FORWARD" and they would proceed to the graduation ceremony. The Junior class would the lead the remaining cadets in finishing the parade, in a ceremonial "passing of the torch."

=== La Salle Rifles ===
The La Salle Rifles was the trick drill team of La Salle Military Academy. Founded by cadet Louis De Thomasis, Class of 1957, the team operated as a special company alongside the school's Drum and Bugle Corps. It consisted of 32 cadets and used a two-tier structure: the "First Sixteen," who competed in tournaments, and the "Second Sixteen," a developmental squad primarily composed of freshmen and sophomores.The team competed against other drill teams, including college-level teams, and won three national championships as well as individual and small-group competitions. Its performances included rifle drills involving throws and catches within the ranks, including routines performed with rifles fitted with sharpened bayonets.De Thomasis later became a Christian Brother and served as headmaster and president of La Salle Military Academy.

=== Drum and Bugle Corps ===
The La Salle Military Academy Drum and Bugle Corps was well known on Long Island and would frequently be invited to local parades. The D + Bs as they were called drilled daily and would provide the military cadence for drill and ceremonies for the Corps of Cadets. The first company on the parade field during ceremonies and the last to step off, the Drum and Bugle Corps were experts in drum and bugle communication and rudiments as well as providing military music for parades. Considered one of the two specialty companies in the regiment, the D+Bs were a presence on campus and would provide the military feel of the parades and ceremonies. The company was led by cadets with support from In the 1990s, the D+Bs converted to a military band formation, replacing the bugles with band instruments giving the company a broader repertoire.

== Legacy ==
A group of alumni and members of the religious order that had operated La Salle Center had later established De La Salle School, a Catholic middle school for boys that catered to students from low income and immigrant families, in Freeport, New York.

== Notable alumni ==
La Salle was the school of many famous people, including Hollywood movie director John Frankenheimer, former New Hampshire Governor and White House Chief of Staff John H. Sununu, two Nicaraguan Presidents, Luis Somoza Debayle and his younger brother, Anastasio Somoza Debayle, and former U.S. Congressman from New York John M. Murphy (1971 graduation speaker), in addition to Bill Donohue, the President of the Catholic League . It also had a large New York underworld area family patronage including sons of the Gambino family, the Lucchese family, as well as Alois Pfister Gonzalez, Alberto Baillères, from Mexico. Jim Brochu, Drama Desk Award winning actor and playwright (1964). In addition, actor Pat Harrington, Jr. former Los Angeles Dodgers owner Peter O'Malley and former Suffolk County, New York Executive Peter Cohalan have attended LaSalle. Cher's son Elijah Blue.

== See also ==
- Fenian Ram
- List of defunct United States military academies
