= Ernest Flagg =

American architect (1857–1947)

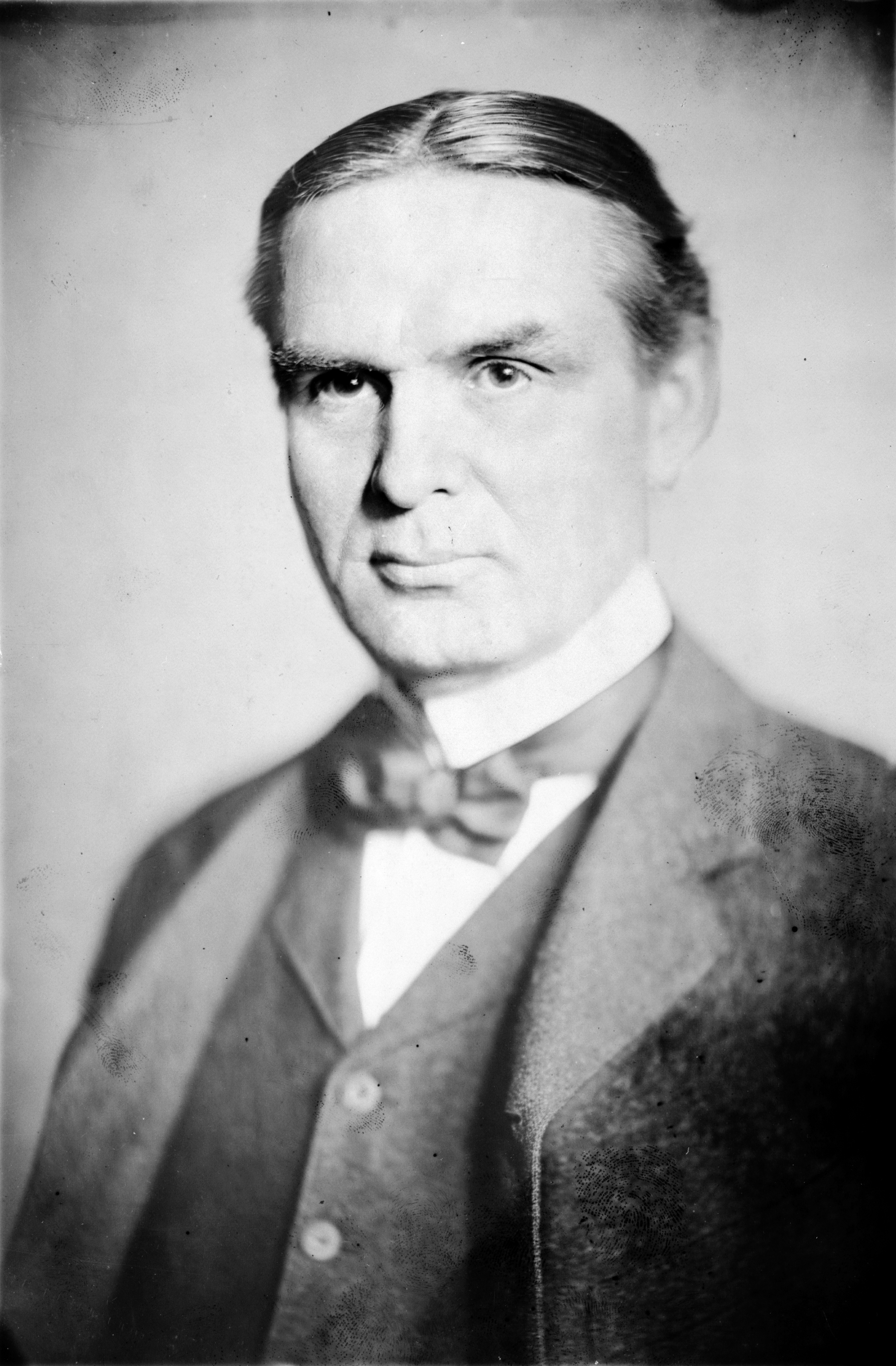
- Born: February 6, 1857; Brooklyn, New York, US
- Died: April 10, 1947 (aged 90); New York City, US
- Education: École des Beaux-Arts
- Occupation: Architect
- Spouse: Margaret E. Bonnell (m. 1899)
- Children: Betsy Flagg Melcher
- Parent(s): Amelia Louisa Hart; Jared Bradley Flagg
- Buildings: Scribner Building; Corcoran Gallery of Art; Singer Building; Charles Scribner's Sons Building; Singer Castle
- Projects: United States Naval Academy

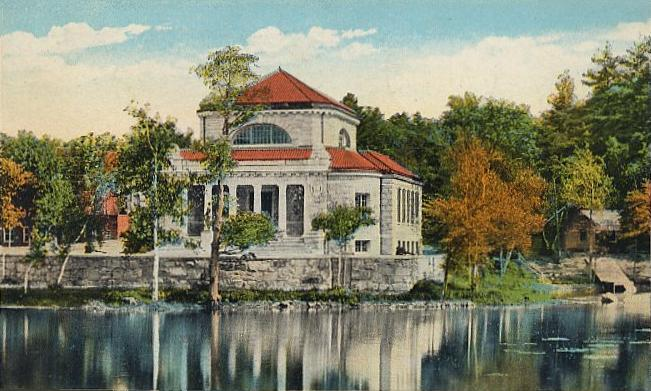
Sheldon Library, 1901

Ernest Flagg (February 6, 1857 – April 10, 1947) was an American architect in the Beaux-Arts style. He was also an advocate for urban reform and architecture's social responsibility.

== Early life and education ==
Flagg was born in Brooklyn, New York. His father Jared Bradley Flagg was an Episcopal priest and a notable painter. Ernest left school at 15 to work as an office boy on Wall Street. After working with his father and brothers in real estate for a few years, he designed duplex apartment plans in 1880 with the architect Philip Gengembre Hubert, for the co-operative apartment buildings Hubert was known.

Cornelius Vanderbilt II, Flagg's cousin through his marriage to Alice Claypoole Gwynne, was impressed by Flagg's work and sent him to study at the École des Beaux-Arts in Paris from 1889 to 1891, under his patronage.

== Professional career ==
In 1891, Flagg began his architectural practice in New York, greatly influenced by his knowledge of the French ideas of architectural design, such as structural rationalism.

During this time he joined with John Prentiss Benson to create Flagg & Benson, which later became Flagg, Benson & Brockway with the addition of Albert Leverett Brockway. FB&B designed St. Luke's Hospital in New York City.

In 1894, he established the architectural firm of Flagg & Chambers with Walter B. Chambers, whom he met in Paris. Usually Flagg alone is credited for some of the work he and Chambers worked on together, such as the Corcoran Gallery of Art, the U.S. Naval Academy, and Pomfret School in Connecticut which he saw as "part of the process of evolution that would contribute to the creation of a national style of architecture."

Louisa Flagg Scribner, Flagg's sister, was the wife of Charles Scribner II. Through this familial connection, Flagg designed six structures located in Manhattan for the publishing family, including at 153–157 Fifth Avenue and 597 Fifth Avenue.

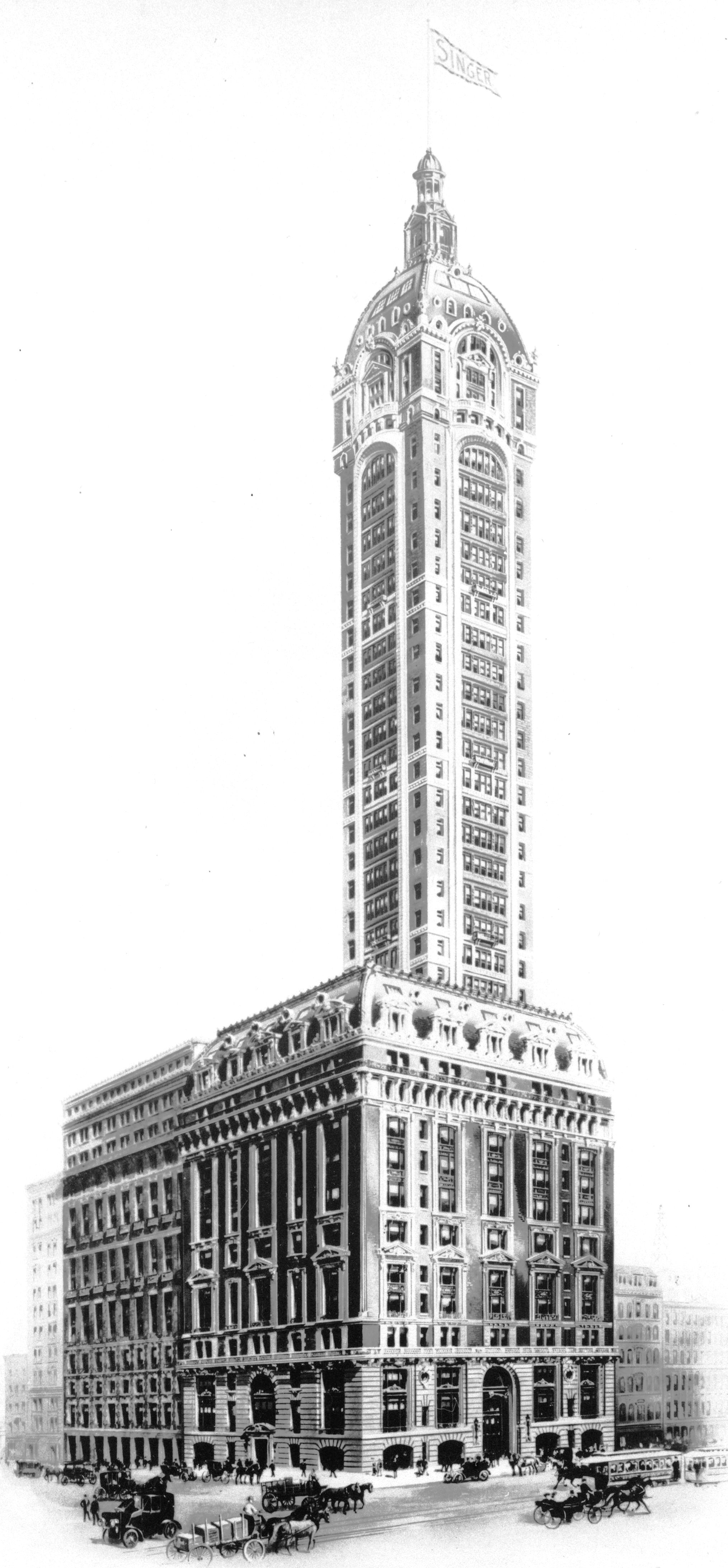
The Singer Building, once the tallest building in the world

Flagg also designed the Singer Building. Completed in 1897 and expanded in 1908, it was then the tallest office building in the world, at 612 feet. Faithful to his Beaux-Arts training, Flagg allowed space around the tall building for light to enter, which was unusual for the time.

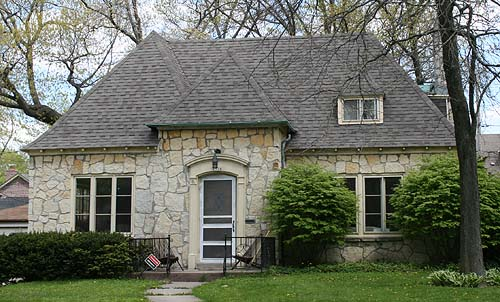
Rufus Arndt Flagg System home, 1925

Though Flagg is best known for his large institutional designs, he was also interested in producing modest, attractive homes affordable to average Americans. He developed innovative techniques toward that end and in 1922 published the book Small Houses, Their Economic Design and Construction. He packaged these techniques and ideas into the Flagg System, and collaborated with builders scattered across the U.S. to build them.

His contributions to zoning and height regulations were essential to the 1916 Zoning Resolution, New York's first laws governing this aspect of the city's architecture. Flagg argued in favor of zoning laws which would regulate the height and setback of buildings, to allow light and air to reach the streets below them. He was a president of the New York Society of Beaux-Arts Architects. A small collection of Flagg's personal and professional papers is held in the Department of Drawings & Archives at Avery Architectural and Fine Arts Library at Columbia University.

== Flagg System Homes ==
The homes that Flagg designed are modest, low to the ground, with stone walls, and often with steep roofs, distinctive ridge dormers, and round-capped chimneys. Their styles suggest Tudor Revival, Cotswold Cottage, or French Provincial to various extents. Flagg generally considered surface decoration "sham", and preferred to suggest styles with the general form of the building, adding interest with chimneys and dormers.

As mentioned above, Flagg aimed to make attractive homes affordable to average families, and he did this by the following means:

- The houses are generally somewhat small in scale compared to their contemporaries. This cut costs and gives them an intimate cottage feel.
- Flagg designed the homes on a "module system", such that the floor plan was laid on a grid where each square was 45 inches (110 cm) on a side. 45 inches was chosen to reduce waste and cutting of standard-length boards and sheets of glass. The same standard sizes were used for vertical dimensions. This grid allowed simplified designs, easy for the builder to follow, and standardized parts that could be produced in quantity for many houses. This was 25 years before the American Institute of Architects and the General Contractors Association settled on standardized sizes.
- The exterior walls are concrete, faced with natural stone. The builder constructed wooden forms and laid natural stone inside, with its flat side against the outside of the form. Then concrete was poured behind the stone, 16 to 20 inches (41 to 51 cm) thick. After the forms were removed, the joints were finished from the outside. The result was a fire-proof, load-bearing wall. Cost was reduced by designing most of the walls low enough to be built without scaffolding, and with unskilled labor, or so Flagg claimed.

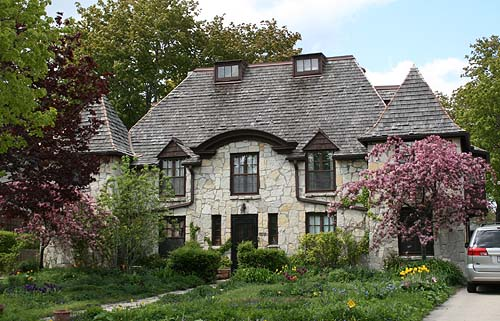
The 1925 Bossert house is French Provincial-styled, with ridge dormers.

- The houses typically have no full basement or full attic, both of which Flagg considered expensive useless space. The lack of basement helped keep the walls low, since they could start near ground level. Steep roofs reach down to the low walls, and inside these roofs Flagg tucked storage space and sometimes rooms. The spaces within the roof are lit by dormers, often including unusual ridge dormers. These dormers can be opened in summer for ventilation.

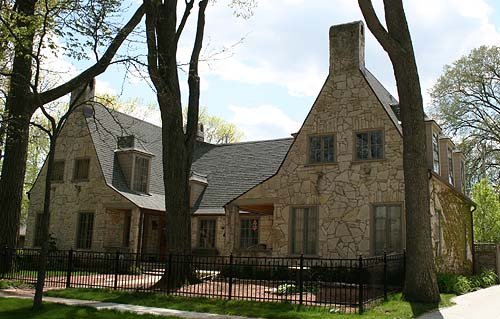
The 1924 Barfield-Staples house displays Flagg's round-capped chimneys.

- Many of the houses have distinctive round-capped stone chimneys on the end walls.
- Instead of gutters and rainpipes, a cement walk ran around the house under the eaves, so run-off would splash and run away, instead of eroding the landscaping.
- Inside, Flagg minimized hallways, considering them wasted space.
- Interior walls were constructed by stretching a jute screen where wanted, then plastering both sides, making a fireproof, sound-dampening partition only 1.5 inches (3.8 cm) thick. This saved space and cost that would have otherwise been spent on studs, lath and plaster.
- Ceiling beams were left exposed, both to save plastering costs and to add interest.
- Inward-opening casement windows were used instead of sash windows.
- Bathroom floors were raised 8 inches (20 cm) above the concrete slab to allow for pipes, and standard fixtures were used to reduce cost.

Flagg tested some of his designs for modest homes on his Staten Island estate, and many of these demonstration models are still in use. Afterwards, more were built around New York and across the US. Flagg worked with particular builders, training them on his system. The builder sent the clients' requirements to Flagg, he sent back plans, the builder and local inspectors adjusted the plans for local building codes, and the builder constructed the home. In the Milwaukee, Wisconsin, area, over two dozen of these homes were built from 1924 to 1926, and they survive largely intact, now listed on the National Register of Historic Places.

== Personal life ==
Ernest Flagg married Margaret E. Bonnell on June 27, 1899, in New York City. They had one daughter, Margaret Elizabeth, who became a well-respected small-scale portrait painter and is known professionally as Betsy Flagg Melcher.

In 1912, Flagg and his wife were on their way to a party held by Stowe Phelps, a fellow architect, when their limousine struck and killed a boy (James McNamara) who had suddenly skated in front of the car. The couple drove the boy to the hospital but he died en route.

== Projects ==
- Scribner Building, Manhattan, New York, 1893
- Unused plan for the Washington State Capitol at Olympia, Washington, 1893
- Pomfret School campus plan, School House and dormitories, early 1900s, and the school's Clark Memorial Chapel, 1908 Pomfret, Connecticut.
- Gov. Samuel J. Tilden Monument, New Lebanon, New York, 1895–1896
- St. Nicholas Rink, 69 West 66th Street, Manhattan, New York, 1896
- St. Luke's Hospital, Manhattan, New York, 1896
- Mills House No. 1, Manhattan, New York, 1896
- Mills House No. 2, Manhattan, New York, 1897
- Singer Building, Manhattan, New York, 1897, expanded 1908, demolished 1968
- Corcoran Gallery of Art, Washington, D.C., 1897
- Indian Neck Hall, estate of Frederick Gilbert Bourne, Oakdale, New York, 1897
- Engine Co. No. 33, Manhattan, New York, 1898
- Oliver Gould Jennings House, Manhattan, New York, 1898
- First National Bank Building, Hartford, Connecticut, 1899
- Ernest Flagg residence, gatehouse and gate, Staten Island, New York, 1900
- Armenian General Benevolent Union of America, Manhattan, New York, c. 1900
- Charlesbank Apartments, Boston, Massachusetts, c. 1900, demolished c. 1960
- Sheldon Library (now admissions office), St. Paul's School, Concord, New Hampshire, 1901

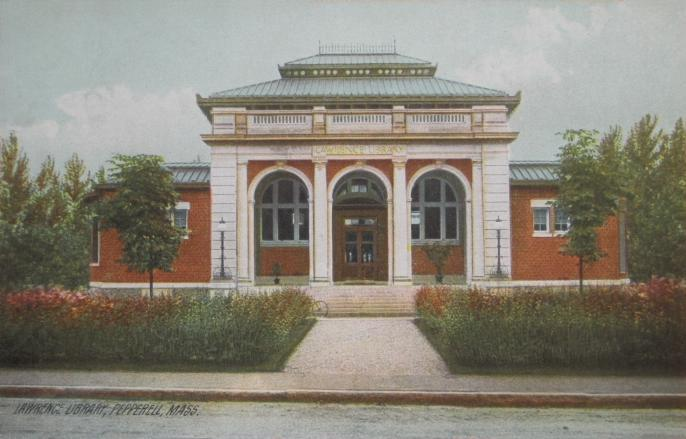
Lawrence Library, 1901

- Lawrence Library, Pepperell, Massachusetts, 1901
- Regency Whist Club, Manhattan, New York, 1904
- The Towers, a "castle" on Dark Island, St. Lawrence Seaway, 1905
- Buildings at the United States Naval Academy, Annapolis, Maryland, including Bancroft Hall (1901–1906), the Naval Academy Chapel (1908), Mahan Hall, Maury Hall, Sampson Hall, and the Superintendent's residence
- "Little" Singer Building, Manhattan, New York, 1907
- 311 West 43rd Street, Manhattan, New York (Originally the Charles Scribner's Sons printing plant), 1908
- Princeton University Press building, Princeton, NJ, 1911
- Charles Scribner Residence, later Polish Delegation to the United Nations, Manhattan, New York, 1912
- Charles Scribner's Sons Building, Manhattan, New York, 1913
- Gwynne Building, Cincinnati, Ohio, 1913
- Rufus Arndt House, Whitefish Bay, Wisconsin, 1925
- Merrill House, Vinegar Hill Historic District, Bloomington, Indiana, 1928
- Celtic Park apartments, Queens, New York, 1930
- Flagg Court housing development, Brooklyn, New York, 1933–36

== Selected writings ==
- Small Houses: Their Economic Design and Construction (1922)
- Le Naos du Parthenon (1928)

== See also ==
- List of American architects
