= Indian Neck Hall =

Mansion in New York, United States

Coordinates: 40.730719°N 73.117410°W

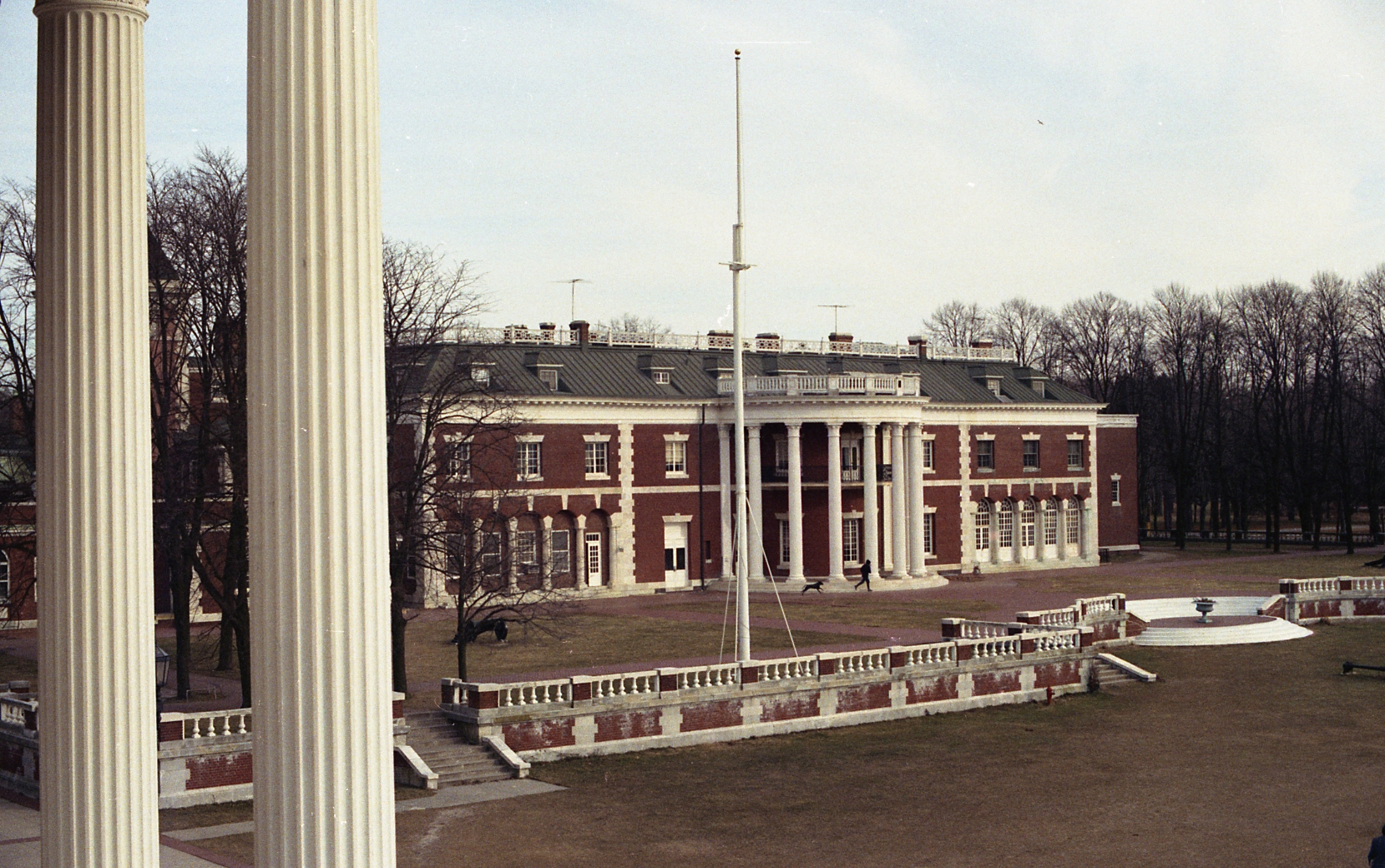
The mansion in 2012

Indian Neck Hall or Bourne Mansion was a country residence of Frederick Gilbert Bourne, president of the Singer Sewing Machine Company. Located on the Great South Bay in Oakdale, New York, it was reputed to have been the largest estate on Long Island when it was built in 1897.

The Georgian-style home was designed by the architect Ernest Flagg. In 1926, the property was sold and became La Salle Military Academy. St. John's University acquired the property in 2001 and offers a number of its graduate degree programs from the Oakdale campus.

== See also ==
- List of Gilded Age mansions
