= First National Bank Building (Hartford, Connecticut) =

- U.S. National Register of Historic Places
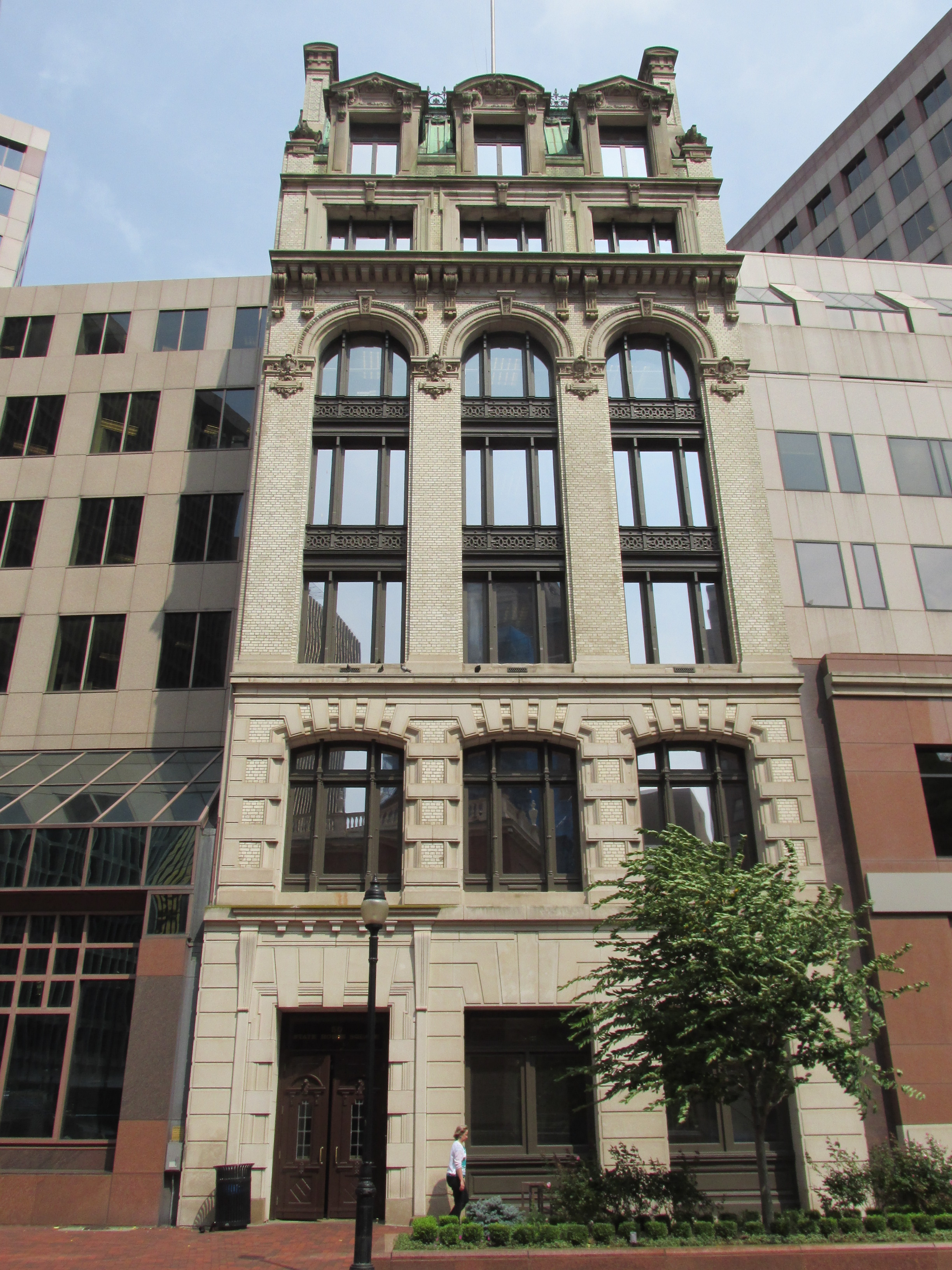

- Location within Connecticut Location within the United States
- Location: 58 State House Square, Hartford, Connecticut
- Coordinates: 41°45′59″N 72°40′21″W
- Area: less than one acre
- Built: 1899
- Architect: Flagg, Ernest
- Architectural style: Beaux Arts
- MPS: Hartford Downtown MRA
- NRHP reference No.: 84000766
- Added to NRHP: December 23, 1984

The First National Bank Building is a historic commercial building at 50-58 State House Square in the heart of Downtown Hartford, Connecticut. Built in 1899, it is a fine local example of Beaux Arts architecture, and was one of the first of Hartford's commercial buildings to have a steel frame. It was listed on the National Register of Historic Places in 1984.

== Description and history ==
The First National Bank Building is located on the north side of State House Square, facing Hartford Old State House. It is a seven-story masonry structure, its exterior walls faced in brick and stone on a frame of steel columns with reinforcing brick vaulted arches. The principal facade is one of the city's finest examples of Beaux Arts architecture. It is three bays wide, with the main entrance in the leftmost bay. The bottom and top two floors are each treated distinctively, with generally similar surrounds on the windows or doors on each level. The central three bays are grouped in tall openings topped by rounded arches and an elaborate cornice.

The building was designed by Ernest Flagg, a New York City architect, and was completed in 1899. It was built on the site of a portion of the former United States Hotel, said portion having been occupied by the bank prior to its demolition to make way for this building. Flagg, trained at the École des Beaux-Arts de Paris, designed the building as a large-scale emulation of a classic column: the two bottom levels representing its base, and the top two its capital, with the intervening levels representing its shaft.

== See also ==
- National Register of Historic Places listings in Hartford, Connecticut
