= Betsy Flagg Melcher =

American painter

- Born: Margaret Elizabeth Flagg; April 8, 1900; New York City, U.S.
- Died: April 21, 1991 (aged 91); Ellsworth, Maine, U.S.
- Education: Miss Spence's School
- Spouse: John Stevens Melcher Jr. (m. 1925; died 1956)
- Awards: Levantia White Boardman Memorial Medal

Margaret Elizabeth Flagg Melcher (April 8, 1900 – April 21, 1991) was an American miniature portraitist who was the daughter of noted architect Ernest Flagg.

== Early life and education ==
Melcher was born in New York City on April 8, 1900. She was a daughter of Ernest Flagg (1857–1947) and Margaret Elizabeth (née Bonnell) Flagg (1882–1978). Her father was the architect of many famous buildings, including the Singer Building, the United States Naval Academy at Annapolis, and the Corcoran Gallery of Art in Washington.

Her paternal grandparents were Amelia Louisa (née Hart) Flagg and Jared Bradley Flagg, a prominent painter who was the son of Henry Collins Flagg and the younger brother of artist George Whiting Flagg.

Betsy graduated from Miss Spence's School and was a member of the Junior League, for whom she made illustrations.

== Career ==
Melcher is known for painted miniature portraits. She studied under Cecilia Beaux, Mabel Rose Welch, and Alfred Hoen. She painted portraits of Marguerite Yourcenar, Brooke Astor, August Belmont, Jr., Samuel Eliot Morison, and Mary Parkman Peabody.

In 1942, she was awarded the Levantia White Boardman Memorial Medal of the American Society of Miniature Painters. In 1951 at the fiftieth annual exhibition of miniatures—antique and contemporary—of the Pennsylvania Society of Miniature Painters, she was awarded the prize for "a miniature of outstanding worth".

She served as president of the American Society of Miniature Painters.

== Personal life ==
On May 16, 1925, she was married to Harvard graduate John Stevens Melcher Jr. (1895–1956) in the chantry of Grace Church by the Rev. Dr. Walter Bowie. Melcher, an investment banker, was the son of John Stevens Melcher, a well known attorney, and Margaret Greenleaf (née Homer) Melcher. He was also the great-grandson of Paran Stevens, one of the proprietors of the old Fifth Avenue Hotel. Together, they lived at 170 East 78th Street in New York and Northeast Harbor, Maine, and were the parents of two daughters:

- Pamela Melcher (1927–2005), a painter who worked as an accountant for her maternal grandfather for a number of years.
- Ursula Ward Melcher (b. c. 1930), who married Comte Marc de Fontaines de Logéres, of Château de Legeres in Ardèche in 1953. Prince Edouard de Lobkowicz was best man at the wedding.

Upon her death in 1991, she was buried in Forest Hill Cemetery in Northeast Harbor, Maine.

=== Descendants ===
Through her second daughter Ursula, she was a grandmother of three, Guy de Fontaines de Logéres, Aymeric de Fontaines de Logéres, and Marc de Fontaines de Logéres Jr.

== Notable works ==
- Old Woman in Grey, watercolor on ivory, 1931; Smithsonian American Art Museum
- "Ernest Flagg", watercolor on ivory, National Gallery of Art. formerly (2014) in the Corcoran Gallery of Art
