= Firehouse, Engine Company 33 and Ladder Company 9 =

Fire station in Manhattan, New York

- Firehouse, Engine Company 33
- U.S. National Register of Historic Places
- New York State Register of Historic Places
- New York City Landmark
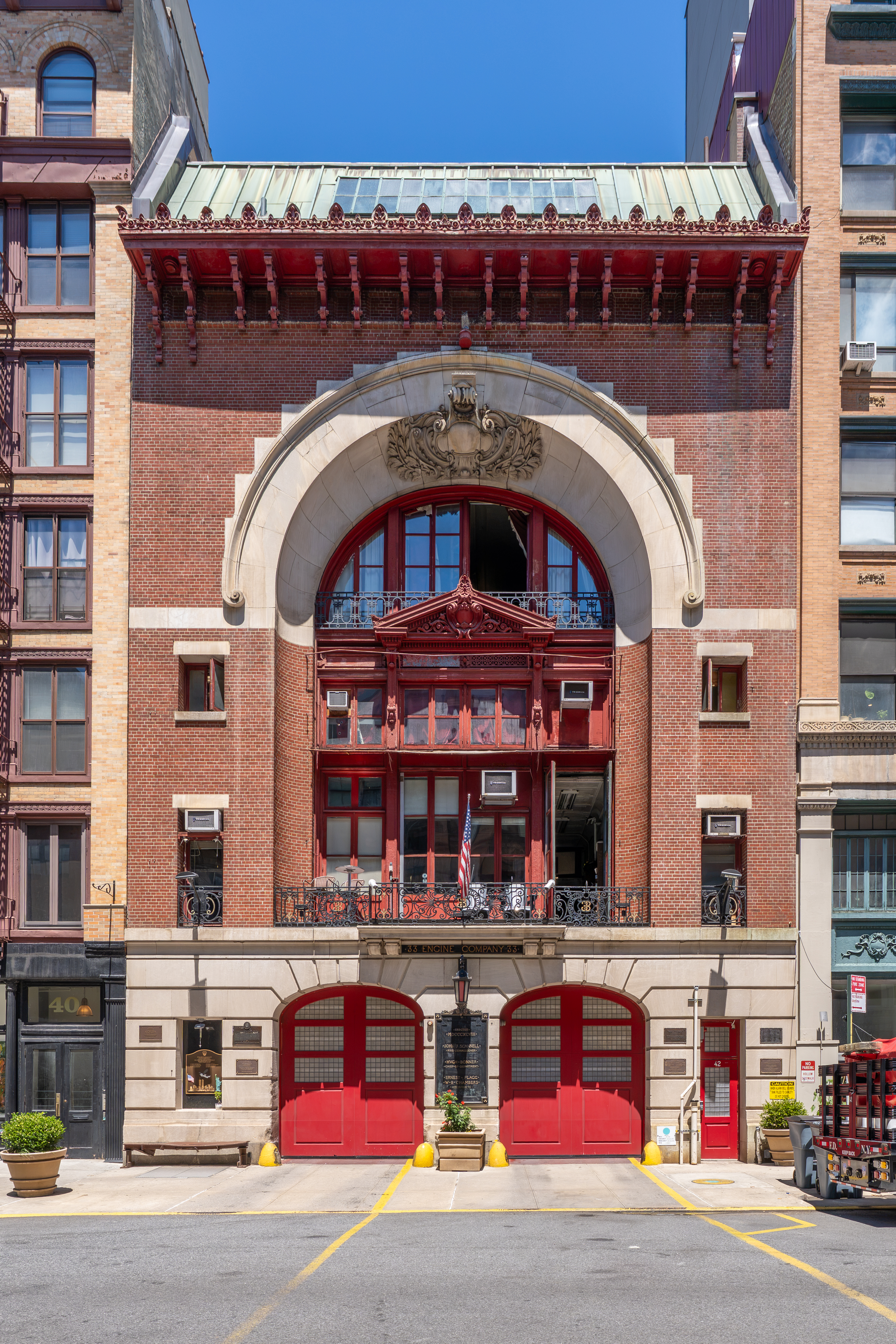

- Location within Manhattan Location within New York City Location within New York Location within the United States
- Location: 42 Great Jones Street, Manhattan, New York, US
- Coordinates: 40.726852°N 73.992547°W
- Built: 1898-1899
- Architect: Ernest Flagg and Walter B. Chambers
- Architectural style: Beaux-Arts
- NRHP reference No.: 72000871
- NYSRHP No.: 06101.000579
- NYCL No.: 0468

Significant dates
- Added to NRHP: March 16, 1972
- Designated NYSRHP: June 23, 1980
- Designated NYCL: November 12, 1968

Firehouse, Engine Company 33 and Ladder Company 9 is a New York City Fire Department firehouse at 42 Great Jones Street in NoHo, Manhattan, New York City, United States. It is the home of Engine Company 33 and Ladder Company 9. The building is a Beaux Arts structure built in 1899 by Ernest Flagg and Walter B. Chambers.

== History ==
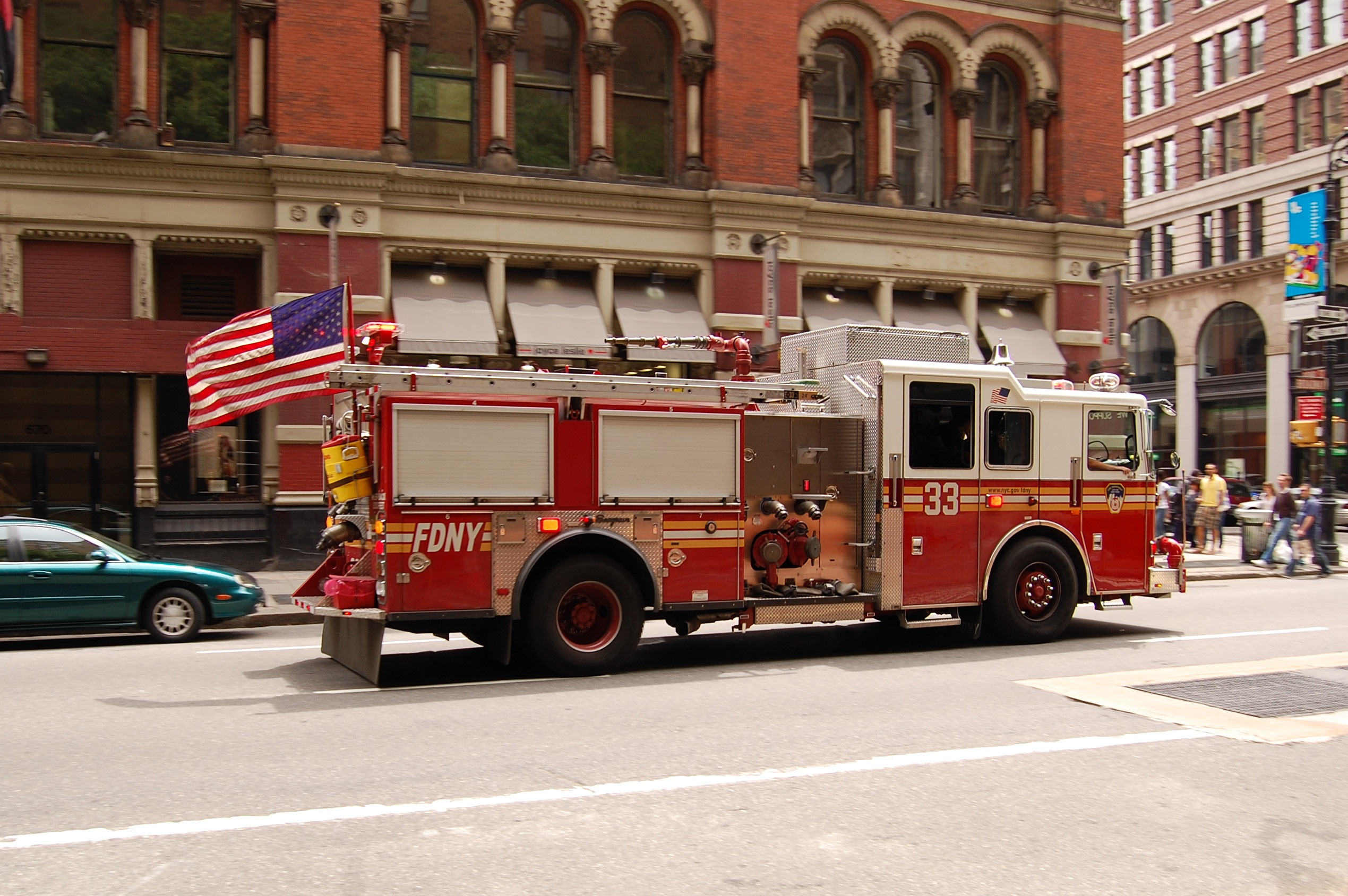
Engine 33 on Broadway near the station on Great Jones Street

Engine 33 Company was originally organized on Mercer Street in lower Manhattan on November 1, 1865, but then moved to its present location on June 1, 1899. Ladder Company 9 was organized in 1865; its first house was on Elizabeth Street. It moved to 42 Great Jones Street in 1948. The Great Jones Street location was also the home of the Chief of Department for a time.

Ten of the fourteen firefighters from this house who responded to the World Trade Center were killed in the September 11 attacks.

== Equipment ==
The first engine kept at 42 Great Jones was powered by steam and built by Clapp & Jones Manufacturing Company, Hudson, New York. It was able to throw water 215 feet.

== See also ==
- National Register of Historic Places listings in Manhattan below 14th Street
- List of New York City Designated Landmarks in Manhattan below 14th Street
