= Schaeffer =

- Language: Middle High German

Origin
- Meaning: "Steward of household"
- Region of origin: Germany, France

Other names
- Variant forms: Schaefer, Schafer, Schaffer, Shaffer, Schafferre, Schafer, Schäfer, Schäffer, Schefer, Scheffer

Schaeffer is a German surname. It is a variant of Schaefer, from German word schäfer ("shepherd") and of Schaffer, from a noun (meaning steward or bailiff) derived from Middle High German schaffen.

== People with the surname ==
=== A ===
- Albert Charles Schaeffer (1907–1957), American mathematician

=== B ===
- Billy Schaeffer (born 1951), American basketball player
- Boguslaw Schaeffer (1929–2019), Polish composer and theoretician
- Brent Schaeffer (born 1986), American football player

=== C ===
- Charles Frederick Schaeffer (1807–1879), American Lutheran clergyman
- Charles William Schaeffer (1813–1896), American Lutheran clergyman and theologian
- Chester Schaeffer (1902–1992), American film editor
- Claude Schaeffer (1898–1982), French archaeologist
- Claude E. Schaeffer (1901–1969), American ethnologist

=== D ===
- David Frederick Schaeffer (1787–1837), American Lutheran clergyman
- Dietrich Schaeffer (1933–2010), German politician

=== E ===
- Edith Schaeffer (1914–2013), Chinese-American Christian author, wife of Francis
- Eric Schaeffer (born 1962), American actor
- Eric D. Schaeffer, American theatre director

=== F ===
- Francis Schaeffer (1912–1984), American-French theologian, philosopher, and founder of L'Abri
- Frank Schaeffer (born 1952), French son of Francis
- Frederick Christian Schaeffer (1792–1832), American Lutheran clergyman
- Frederick David Schaeffer (1760–1836), German-born American Lutheran clergyman
- Fritz Schaeffer (1888-1967), German politician

=== G ===
- Georg Anton Schäffer, (1779–1836), German physician and adventurer
- George Schaeffer, American football coach

=== H ===
- Harry Schaeffer (1924–2008), American baseball player

=== J ===
- Jacob Christian Schaeffer (1718–1790), German scientist
- Jack Schaeffer (1907–1991), American musician, record producer and clarinetist
- James Schaeffer (1885–1972), American college sports coach
- James Soloman Schaeffer, American drum major and leader of the Highty-Tighties
- Jim Schaeffer, American drum major and leader of the Highty-Tighties
- Jody Schaeffer, American cartoonist and co-creator of Megas XLR
- John Schaeffer (art collector) (1941–2020), Australian art collector and businessman
- John Schaeffer (environmentalist) (born 1949), American solar power advocate
- John Schaeffer (trainer) (born 1951), American fitness trainer and author
- John Nevin Schaeffer (1882–1942), American classicist
- Jonathan Schaeffer, Canadian computer scientist

=== L ===
- Lucien Schaeffer (1928–2016), French football player
- Lawrence Schaeffer (born 1947), American geneticist

=== M ===
- Matthew Schaeffer, American guitarist in the rock band Monovox
- Mead Schaeffer (1898–1980), American artist and illustrator

=== P ===
- Pierre Schaeffer (1910–1995), French musician and pioneer of musique concrète

=== R ===
- Rebecca Schaeffer (1967–1989), American actress who was murdered by a fan
- Roberto Schaefer, American photographer

=== S ===
- Sandra Schaeffer (born 1946), American singer, author and game inventor
- Serafia Fredrika Schaeffer (1800-1887), Finnish herbal healer
- Stefanie Schaeffer (born 1974), The Apprentice 6 winner
- Steve Schaeffer (born 1954), American studio musician

=== T ===
- Tarah Lynne Schaeffer (born 1984), American actress, Sesame Street
- Theresa Schaeffer, 19th century German composer
- Tom Schaeffer (1940–2020), Swedish curler

=== W ===
- Wendy Schaeffer (born 1974), Australian equestrian
- Wolfgang Schaeffer (born 2009), American actor

== See also ==
- Schaefer
- Schaeffler (surname)
