= Shefer (surname) =

Shefer is a surname. Notable people with the surname include:

- Alexandr Shefer (born 1971), Kazakhstani racing cyclist
- Andrei Shefer (born 1981), Russian ice hockey player
- Ivan Shefer (born 1983), Russian ice dancer.
- Miri Shefer-Mossensohn (fl. early 21st century), Israeli professor of Middle Eastern history
- Reuven Shefer (1925–2011), Israeli theater and film actor
- Ze'ev Shefer (1891–1964), Israeli politician

== See also ==
- Schaeffer
- Sheffer
