= Charles Schaeffer =

Charles Schaeffer may refer to:

- Charles Ashmead Schaeffer (1843–1898), President of the University of Iowa
- Charles Frederic August Schaeffer (1860–1934), American entomologist
- Charles William Schaeffer (1813–1896), American Lutheran clergyman and theologian
- Charles Frederick Schaeffer (1807–1879), American Lutheran clergyman
- Charles Schäffer (1838–1903), American physician and botanist
