= Frederick Schaeffer =

Frederick Schaeffer may refer to:

- Frederick Christian Schaeffer (1792–1832), Lutheran clergyman of the United States
- Frederick David Schaeffer (1760–1836), German-American Lutheran clergyman

== See also ==
- Fred K. Schaefer (1904–1953), geographer
- Frederick Schaefer (died 1862), German revolutionary and Union Army colonel
