= Lutheran Home at Germantown =

Coordinates: 40.056086°N 75.188448°W

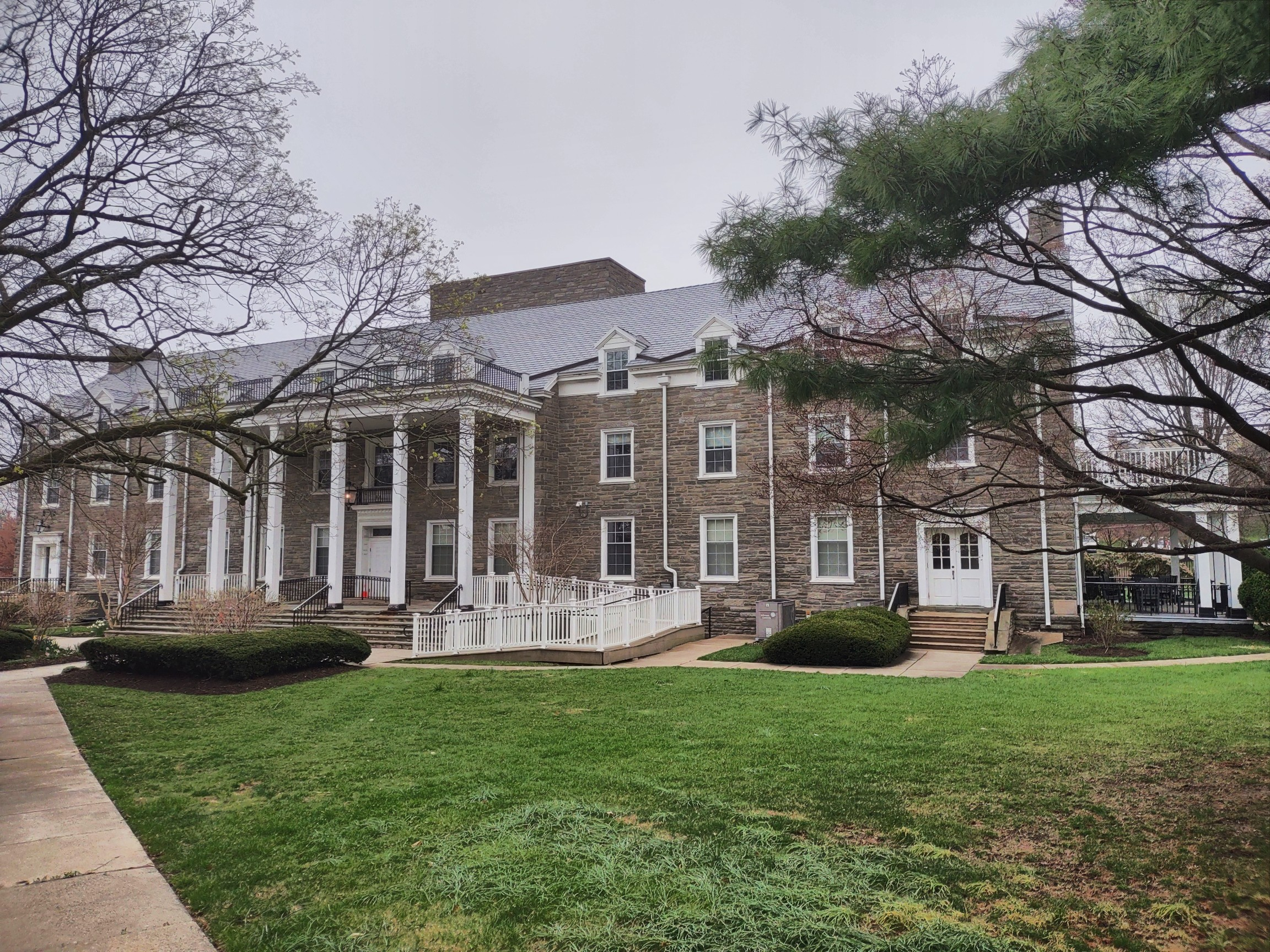
Former Lutheran Home at Germantown in 2026

The Lutheran Home in Germantown, now Silver Springs – Martin Luther School, began in 1859 as an orphanage for children that was originally located in the Mt. Airy, Philadelphia. This institution was a continuation of the work of Rev. William A. Passavant but was founded and managed by Elizabeth Fry Ashmead Schaeffer, who received a single dollar from Passavant and began the mission. The Lutheran Home in Germantown later moved to the Silver Springs property in Plymouth Meeting, Pennsylvania, where it continues as a residential treatment facility for children and school for elementary students and middle schoolers.

== Story of the first dollar ==
The Lutheran Home in Germantown was a continuation of the work of the Rev. William A. Passavant, who was famous for his work not only as an abolitionist and Lutheran pastor, but also as one of the proponents of social ministries in the Lutheran Church through the Passavant charitable institutions that he created. This Lutheran Home in Germantown was not organically connected with the Passavant Home and Farm School of Zelienople but was an offshoot, thanks to the help of the founding director of the home in Germantown, Elizabeth Ashmead Schaeffer.

In 1852, on his way to the Ministerium of Pennsylvania, Passavant stopped off in Womelsdorf, and inspected an orphanage of the Reformed Church. Reaching Philadelphia, he visited the home of Elizabeth Ashmead Schaeffer and the Pastor of St. Michael's Church of Germantown, Charles W. Schaeffer, and (as one account states) he told Mrs. Schaeffer, "Why cannot the Lutherans have an orphanage as well and the Reformed? Now, everything must have a beginning: I will give you the first dollar." Elizabeth Schaeffer would place that dollar in her knitted purse that would be cherished by the Home in Germantown for generations.

== History ==
After receiving the first dollar and the motivation from William Passavant, Elizabeth Schaeffer gathered women from local Lutheran churches of Philadelphia to collaborate to begin the Lutheran Home at Germantown. On March 12, 1859, they rented a house at 6719 Germantown Ave in Mt. Airy, Philadelphia. Sister Louise Marthens came with four orphaned girls from the Passavant home in Pittsburgh, Pennsylvania, to help get the home in Germantown off the ground. Within eight weeks seven orphans and a matron had been admitted to live in the home. Elizabeth Schaeffer became the director of the school but relied on the help of the women of the local Lutheran congregations to help her keep up with the work of the home. The women would help sew, give advice, and attend to the different needs of the building, clothing, and children.

The first admitted child to the orphanage was George Silvers, who was born on May 6, 1853. By the middle of June, thirteen had been admitted and very quickly, Schaeffer and the other leaders realized that it was necessary to secure a larger space.

In October, 1859, a new site was purchased at 6950 Germantown Ave, in Mt. Airy for a total of $7,000. The managers were able to $4,300 at the time of the purchase through the generosity of the members of congregations in Philadelphia and elsewhere. The property was five acres and contained multiple buildings for usage. It was within the city limits and was in easy traveling distance to the downtown portion of Philadelphia by railroad or horse carriage.

The women of various congregations in Philadelphia would meet with Elizabeth Schaeffer to help ensure the longevity of the ministry. On May 1, 1860, constitution and by-laws were finalized, officers were elected and an application was sent to the state for incorporation. Two ladies were to be chosen by each of the local Lutheran congregations to be representatives to constitute the Board of Lady Managers. While the board of trustees constituted of mostly men (other than Elizabeth Schaeffer as the director), it was especially stipulated that the board of trustees were not to interfere with the internal management of the home but that responsibility fell to the Board of Lady Managers alone.

In 1864, the home grew exponentially because of the number of children left orphaned by the deaths and violence of the Civil War. The Home at Germantown was one of the first to open its doors for the relief of the children. As of July 1865 there were 68 orphans, October 2nd there were 107, and by the next April there were 131.

From the beginning, Elizabeth Schaeffer imagined this ministry to be inclusive to all and a place that would teach the children skills and practices to excel in the world. The Home would describe itself as a place, "for destitute orphan children without distinction of creed or country, where they may be educated in any useful branch of business to which they may be inclined, and thus prepared for the active duties of life."

In 1869, it was realized that there was a need for a more sustainable financial backing. Elizabeth Schaeffer highly disliked the idea of transferring the control and responsibility, but realized the inevitable as the Home became a larger corporation. On April 9, 1872, the Board of Lady Managers transferred the control and responsibility of the Home to the Ministerium of Pennsylvania. The Board of Lady Managers became the Board of Lady Visitors, which composed of the two representatives from each local Lutheran congregation but they served in co-operating and support efforts rather than in their previous positions of leadership.

=== Lutheran support and education ===
The Lutheran Home at Germantown would not have been able to get off the ground without the help and support of the members of the local Lutheran congregations in Philadelphia. Along with donations of finances and resources, the local congregations would also provide religious education, pastoral support, and donations of Bibles to every child at the time of their confirmation.

The Lutheran churches considered it a priority that the children receive religious instruction.

The Church was most concerned with the welfare of the children to its care. They were instructed in both the English and German languages, as so many came from German-speaking families, and so much of the support came from German congregations. Their religious training was thorough, with instruction in the Bible and Luther's small Catechism. They attended school and religious services regularly.

In December, 1860, Rev. J. Schladermundt became the first House-Father of the home. Throughout the early history of Home, Lutheran pastors and seminary students at The Lutheran Theological Seminary at Philadelphia (then often called the Mt. Airy Seminary), would help with the religious instruction of the students, using the Bible and Luther's Small Catechism as the textbooks. The seminary students would give assistance in numerous ways. One student, Rev. E. L. Leisey, reflected on his experience and according to his description, he served as a, "big brother, a Bible School teacher, playground director, chauffeur, and general utility man."

The Home also developed a close relationship (because of proximity and affiliation) with St. Michael's Germantown, the Lutheran Church at 6671 Germantown Ave, that was just a few blocks away. In 1874–1890, it was reported that 121 residents of the Home were confirmed into membership at St. Michael's. The children would participate in Sunday-school and take part in the annual church picnic.

==== Donation Day ====
Donation Day was an annual celebration in which the churches of the surrounding areas would gather resources and goods and bring them to the Home and visit both the children and the grounds for a day of activities. The first Donation Day took place on Ascension Day, May 27, 1881.

The day is not merely a day of donations and for the improvement of the finances of the Home, but a day for the coming together of friends from far and near, who are united together in the spirit of loving devotion. It has become a general reunion day, with untold blessing to the institution and to the cause of Christian benevolence.

=== Shift in Education ===
In 1912, a shift occurred in education. Before then, all secular instruction of the children was conducted in the Home. However, at this point in time children were allowed to attend the public school in Mt. Airy. The public instruction was supplemented by additional instruction in religion and German.

== Asylum for the aged and infirm ==
From the beginning, the Lutheran Home at Germantown was also supposed to be an asylum for the aged and infirm. The asylum was to be open to "adult members of the Lutheran Church in want through old age, accident, or disease." The first inmate of the asylum was Sister Margaret Kaufflet, who arrived May 10, 1860. She would not only be a resident of the home but also an invaluable presence for other residents as time went on. Sister Margaret was described as having a gentle disposition, and a sweet spirit. When other aged residents were troubled, they would be brought to her room, "the word of peace was spoken, and the trouble vanished."

The asylum is no longer affiliated with the Home but has been incorporated through other ministries of the Evangelical Lutheran Church in America.

== Silver Springs – Martin Luther School ==
Over 100 years after its founding, the Lutheran Orphans' Home at Germantown was moved to the Silver Springs farm in Plymouth Meeting, Pennsylvania where it still resides today. While nonsectarian with regard to whom it serves (holding true to its mission from the very beginning), Silver Springs remains a Social Ministry Organization of the Evangelical Lutheran Church in America. In 1969, the Silver Springs program was expanded with the establishment of Martin Luther School, a state licensed private school designed to serve the special education needs of children that live in the residential treatment facility and also children of the communities of the tristate area.

=== Mission Statement of Silver Springs ===
Holding true to the mission and values of Elizabeth Schaeffer,

The intentions of the corporation are exclusively for charitable and educational purposes, particularly to afford a home, education, and support for destitute or dependent children and mental health services for such children and others without distinction of creed, color, or country, and to engage in related study and research.

Today Silver Spring – Martin Luther School has over 65 children in its residential treatment program and over 200 students in its schools with grades from Kindergarten through eighth grade.
