= Charles Schaefer =

Charles Schaefer may refer to:

- Charles E. Schaefer, American psychologist
- Charles Ed Schaefer, member of the Illinois House of Representatives

== See also ==
- Charles Schaeffer (disambiguation)
