= Dirty Mind (disambiguation) =

Dirty Mind is an album by Prince.

Dirty Mind may also refer to:

- Dirty Mind (Celly Cel album), 2017
- "Dirty Mind" (Prince song), the title track to the album
- "Dirty Mind" (The Pipettes song), a 2005
- "Dirty Mind" (Shakespears Sister song), 1990
- "Dirty Mind", a song by Prism from Beat Street, 1983
- "Dirty Mind", a song by Tages from Tages 2, 1966
- "Dirty Mind", a song by The Cross from Blue Rock, 1991
- "Dirty Mind", a 2015 song by Flo Rida
- Dirty Mind Tour, a concert tour by Prince, from December 1980–April 1981
- Dirty Minds, a board game made by TDC Games in Itasca
- Dirty Mind (film), a 2008 film by Pieter Van Hees
- "Dirty Mind", a 2011 song by 3OH!3
