= St. Michael's Evangelical Lutheran Church (Mount Airy, Philadelphia) =

- St. Michael's Lutheran Church
- U.S. National Historic Landmark District – Contributing property
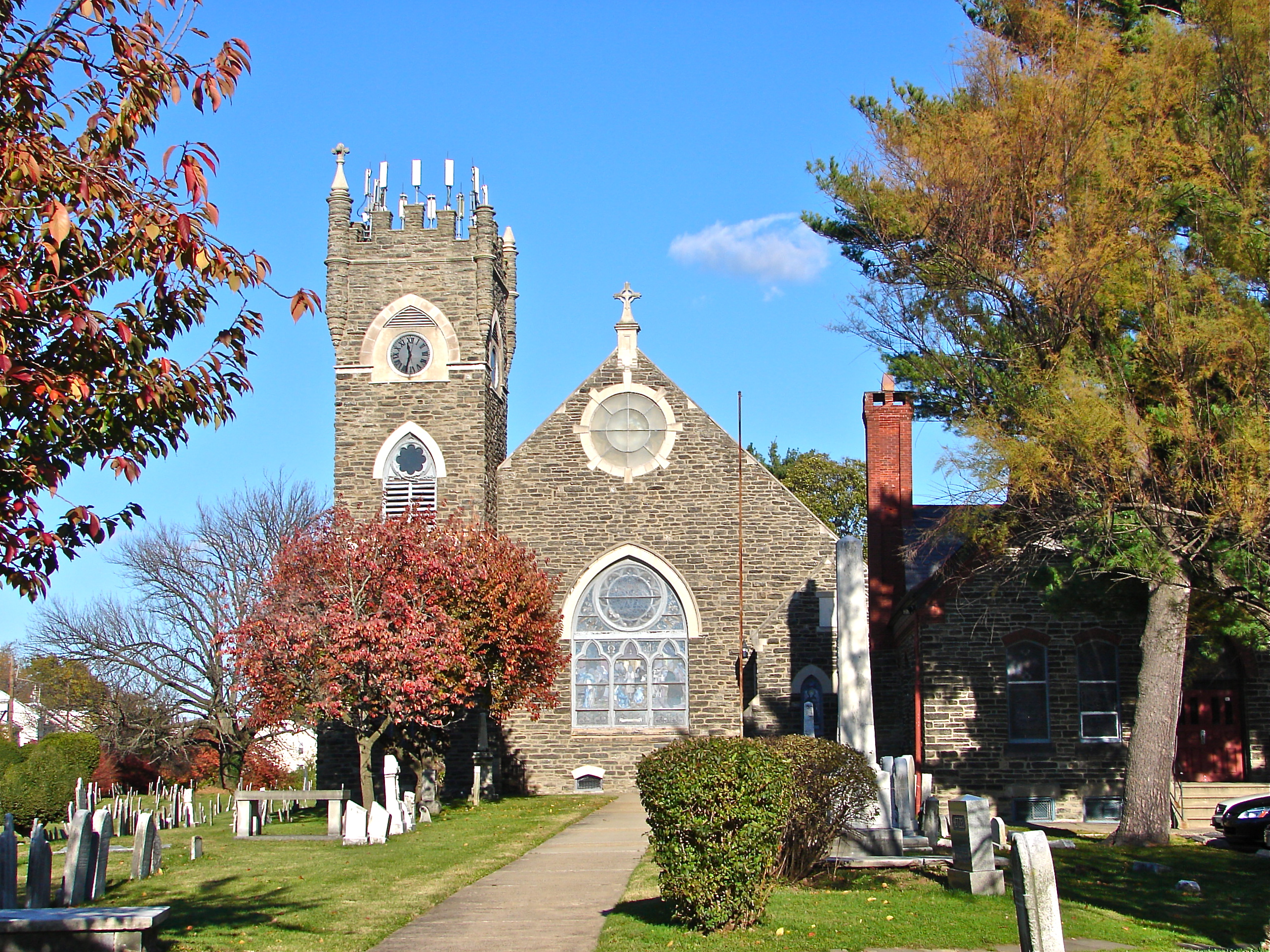
- St. Michael's in 2010

- Location within Pennsylvania Location within the United States
- Location: 6671 Germantown Ave. Philadelphia, Pennsylvania
- Coordinates: 40.0521°N 75.1845°W
- Area: about 3 acres
- Built: 1897
- Architectural style: Gothic Revival
- Part of: Colonial Germantown Historic District (ID66000678)

St. Michael's Evangelical Lutheran Church is a historic church building in the Mount Airy neighborhood of Philadelphia, just north of the Germantown neighborhood. The congregation was founded sometime before 1728 and three successive church buildings have occupied the same location since that time. The church was closed in 2016.

== History ==
=== Beginnings ===
Though Germantown was dominated by Germans from its founding in 1683, the Lutheran denomination did not become well established there until after 1740. Different German religious denominations grew and changed once they came to America. The first settlers were German Quakers and the Mennonite church soon become important in the town. Dunkards, Moravians, the German Reformed Church and other groups joined the religious mix.

The Lutheran and Reformed churches had the largest membership in Germantown in the last half of the eighteenth century, with the Lutherans becoming the largest by the end of the century. St. Michael's and other churches were affected by the lack of ordained ministers, who often rode circuits to serve many churches. It was not until 1790 that a pastor was able to settle his family in Germantown.

The first historical record of the St. Michael's congregation is in 1728 on the death of its first pastor, Anthony Jacob Henckel, who is buried in the cemetery. Sometime after 1731 John Christian Schulz may have briefly served the Germantown congregation before returning to Germany seeking support for Pennsylvania Lutherans. John Dylander, the Swedish pastor of Gloria Dei (Old Swedes) Church from 1737-1742, served many Lutheran churches, both Swedish and German, during this time, including the church in Germantown.

Several deeds and land leases were dated between 1737 and 1751 and cover 130 by 1,000 feet (40 by 305 m) about 4 acres, from Germantown Avenue to the current Musgrave Street, bounded on the northwest by the current East Phil Ellena Street. More than half this area is still occupied by the church building or cemetery though the area from Ross St. to Musgrave St. is occupied by other buildings.

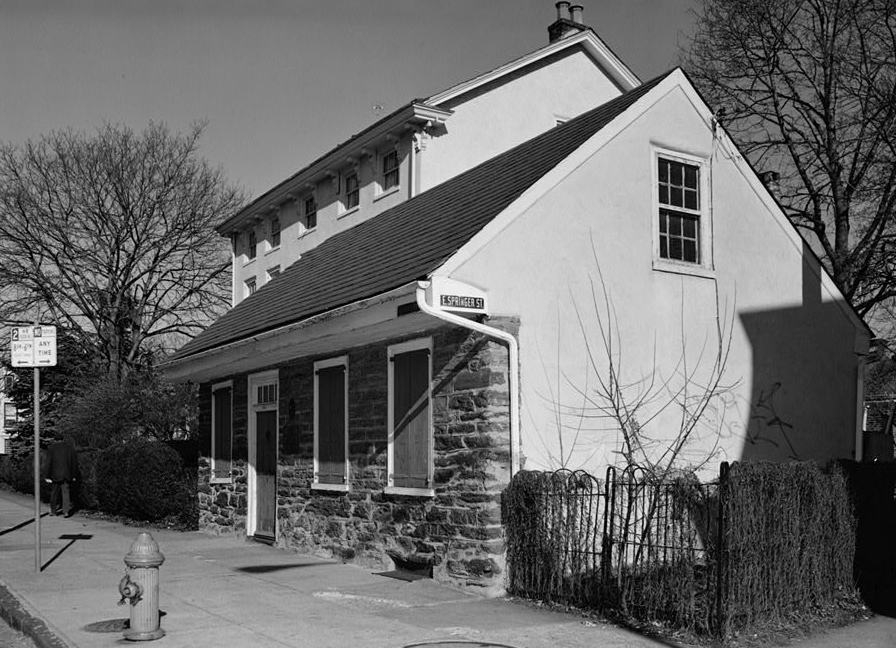
Beggarstown School in 1972

The first stone church on the site may have been built in 1730. This building was expanded in 1746 and provided with a bell tower and pipe organ in the 1750s. Beggarstown School is a small adjacent building built c. 1740, which was used to teach basic reading, writing, and arithmetic to local students. While most students were part of the congregation, some attended simply because it was the closest local school. It was listed on the National Register of Historic Places in 1971.

Henry Melchior Muhlenberg, the patriarch of the Lutheran Church in America, was an early pastor after arriving in Pennsylvania in 1742. He was assigned to three churches: in Providence (the current Trappe), New Hanover and in Philadelphia proper. The church in Philadelphia, located on 5th Street, was confusingly also called St. Micheal's. Muhlenberg, however, served many other churches, including St. Michael's in Germantown. Charles W. Schaeffer, who was later pastor of St. Michael's Germantown, wrote in his Early History of the Lutheran Church in America that the Germantown church was the fourth church where Muhlenberg became pastor, but that "he treated (it) as an appendage of the church in Philadelphia." Kline states that the Germantown church joined the other three churches in a united congregation three or four months after the others.

In 1745 Muhlenberg assigned the Germantown and Philadelphia churches to Peter Brunnholz, an ordained minister newly arrived from Germany. After Brunnholtz died, Muhlenberg replaced him in 1757 with John Frederick Handschuh. Handschuh faced a revolt from the congregation in 1760, which ostensibly started because of bells attached to collection baskets. The congregation's dissatisfaction with Handschuh and with Muhlenberg was substantial, involving issues of local versus centralized control by Muhlenberg, their places of origin within Germany, and Muhlenberg's pietistic theological training. A small part of the congregation supporting Muhlenberg formed a new church, calling their own pastor, J. Nicholas Kurtz. In 1762 they regained partial use of St. Michael's building by court order. In 1764 they called another pastor, John Ludwig Voigt, which led to a reconciliation of the congregation.

Johann Frederick Schmidt served as pastor from 1769, through the Revolutionary War, until 1786. He was an advocate of American independence and fled from the British during the Battle of Germantown in 1777. The parsonage, now known as the Michael Billmeyer House, is located near the corner of Germantown Avenue and Upsal Street, where an attack on Cliveden was directed. The parsonage was looted during the battle, and the church was occupied with the organ and pews destroyed. The large cemetery which surrounds the church includes graves of several veterans of the Revolutionary War.

In 1785 the church was officially incorporated by an Act of Assembly of Pennsylvania.

=== Nineteenth century ===
Germantown's residents had begun assimilating into American culture and religion during the eighteenth century as German-speakers intermarried with English-speakers and some of their children spoke mainly English. Non-Germans migrated to the village as it grew into a suburb of Philadelphia. During the nineteenth century the assimilation continued and in 1854 the suburb was annexed by Philadelphia. By 1811 the village had Anglo-American Methodist, Presbyterian, and Episcopalian churches.

Frederick David Schaeffer, who had immigrated from Germany at age sixteen in 1776, served as pastor of St. Michael's from 1790-1812. On January 1, 1813, one source reports that the congregation voted to conduct the service in English on alternate Sundays.

The church's Sunday school, one of the first in the United States, was begun in 1817 to teach underprivileged children on a day when they were off from work. The Sunday school program later started branches in Chestnut Hill, Nicetown, Rising Sun, and other nearby neighborhoods. A new church was built on the site in 1819 at the same time the old church was being torn down. The bells were damaged during the demolition, so a new bell tower was not constructed. The current building was dedicated in 1897.

The Rev. John C. Baker served St. Michael's from 1812 to about 1826. In 1826 he was called to a church in Harrisburg and replaced by the Rev. Benjamin Keller. Keller resigned about 1837 over disputes on the question of using English or German during church services, as well as the question of the role of women in the church. Members of the congregation formed the English Evangelical Lutheran Church in Germantown, later known as Trinity Lutheran Church, in 1836.

Services continued using only German until 1845 when S. Mosheim Schmucker, who only spoke English, became the new pastor. Members of the congregation who preferred German services formed the St. Thomas German Church.

The German Reformed church on Market Square experienced similar language conflicts and splintering, until its 1854 transformation into the Market Square Presbyterian Church.

Keller's stepson, the Rev. Charles W. Schaeffer, was pastor from 1849-1875. Charles W. was the grandson of Frederick David Schaeffer and the author of Early History of the Lutheran Church in America. He helped organize the Lutheran Theological Seminary at Philadelphia, near St. Michael's, and served there as Professor of Ecclesiastical History. A new parsonage was constructed in 1855. and a Sunday School building in 1866.

Schaeffer married Elizabeth Fry Ashmead Schaeffer in 1836. She worked to raise the role of women in the church and was the founder and first director of the Lutheran Home at Germantown for orphans. This institution is still in operation and was originally located two blocks north of St. Michael's.

The Gothic Revival church currently on the site was designed by Philadelphia architect T. Frank Miller and built 1896-1897. It is a contributing building to the Colonial Germantown Historic District, a National Landmark district.

=== 20th and 21st centuries ===
By 1900 Germantown had become better integrated into the city of Philadelphia and less of a German suburb. Manufacturing plants and housing for workers grew in southern Germantown, with more than 4,000 workers employed by 82 textile firms. To the north, Chestnut Hill and Mt. Airy developed exclusive residential areas along commuter railways. In 1900 only 7.2% of Germantown's population were German immigrants or first generation German-Americans. Manufacturing jobs continued to grow until the end of World War II, then declined. As part of the Great Migration of African-Americans from the south, the ethnic character of the neighborhood changed by the mid 20th century. As manufacturing jobs declined, St. Michael's became part of an "inner-city" neighborhood.

The St. Thomas German Church, which had separated from St. Michael's in 1845, merged back into St. Michael's in 1957 when its Pastor, Kurt E. B. Molzhan, was called to serve at St. Michael's. German services were reinstituted, along with English services.

The Rev. Andrena Ingram was pastor from 2006-2016. She was the first African American woman pastor at St. Michael's. Under her guidance the church worked with local charities, reaching out to the diverse Germantown community, including the poor, the sick, and the hungry. The church promoted HIV/AIDS awareness and offered free HIV testing and prevention programs.

By 2012 the congregation had only about 35 members and the sanctuary was closed during the winter to avoid the cost of heating it.

The church remained active for over 288 years until it closed on September 11, 2016. Bishop Claire Schenot Burkat of the Southeastern Pennsylvania Synod presided at the final service, assisted by the Rev. Dr. Philip D.W. Krey, a former member of the congregation and the retired president of the Lutheran Theological Seminary at Philadelphia. The Synod is now responsible for the church and cemetery.

== Pastors ==
For the earliest pastors the records may be incomplete and include pastors who served multiple churches.

- The Rev. Anthony Jacob Henckel, 1668-1728
- The Rev. John Dylander, 1737-1741
- The Rev. Valentine Kraft, 1741-1742
- The Rev. Henry Melchoir Muhlenberg, 1743-1745
- The Rev. Peter Brunnholtz, 1745-1751
- The Rev. John Frederick Handschuh, 1751-1753
- The Rev. John C. Andraea, 1753-1754
- The Rev. Mr. Funk, 1754-1757
- The Rev. Ph. H. Rapp, 1757-1765
- The Rev. Jacon van Buskirk, 1765-1769
- The Rev. John Frederick Schmidt 1769-1786
- The Rev. John Frederick Weinland, 1786-1789
- The Rev. Frederick D. Schaeffer 1789-1812
- The Rev. John C. Baker, 1812-1827
- The Rev. Benjamin Keller, 1817-1835
- The Rev. John W. Richards, 1836-1845
- The Rev. S. Mosheim Schmucker, 1846-1848
- The Rev. Charles W. Schaeffer, 1849-1875
- The Rev. Frederick A. Kaehler, 1874-1884
- The Rev. John P. Deck, 1884-1889
- The Rev. Paul G. Klingler, 1890-1891
- The Rev. S.A. Ziegenfuss, 1892-1910
- The Rev. Stephen M. Paulson, 1911-1921
- The Rev. W. Karl Hemsath, 1922-1952
- The Rev. Leon N. Zahn, 1953-1957
- The Rev. Kurt E. B. Molzhan 1957-1966
- The Rev. Ulrich Martin Keemss 1966-1971
- The Rev. Dr. Charles P. Sigel, 1972-1978
- The Rev. Michael L. Cobbler, 1979-1982
- The Rev. Janet S. Peterman, 1982 -2006
- The Rev. Arvid Anderson, 1989-1990
- The Rev. Harvey Davis, 1990-1992
- The Rev. Violet Little, 1992-2006
- The Rev. Andrena Ingram, 2007-2016

== Cemetery ==
The earliest graves in the cemetery are believed to date from the early eighteenth century, but many early gravestones are in German and are illegible due to weathering and acid rain. Burials include:

- Michael Billmeyer
- Anthony Jacob Henckel, first pastor, d. 1728
- Jacob Anthony Hinkle, who built the Mermaid Inn in Chestnut Hill in 1746
- Mary Elizabeth Hinkle, d. 1742, the earliest legible gravestone
- Christopher Ludwick, Baker General to the Continental Army
- Hans Jurg Ruger (Rex), who moved to Germantown in 1691
- Elizabeth Fry Ashmead Schaeffer
- Charles W. Schaeffer, Elizabeth's husband and pastor from 1849-1875
- James Witherspoon and four unknown soldiers who died in the Battle of Germantown, and
- Four other veterans of the American Revolution
- Seven veterans of the War of 1812
- William Tourison, John Nice, Henry Nice, who were killed at the Battle of Gettysburg, and
- Twenty other veterans of the U.S. Civil War.

== See also ==
- Lutheran Theological Seminary at Philadelphia, located 1 mile north
- Beggarstown School, historic school attached to the church
- Concord School House (Philadelphia), historic school located half a mile south
