= Charles Ashmead Schaeffer =

Seventh President of the University of Iowa

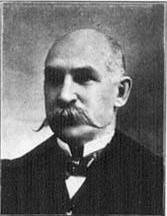

President of the University of Iowa
- In office 1887 – 1898
- Preceded by: Josiah Little Pickard
- Succeeded by: Amos Noyes Currier (Acting)

Personal details
- Born: August 14, 1843 Harrisburg, Pennsylvania
- Died: September 23, 1898 (aged 55) Iowa City, Iowa
- Spouse: Evelyn Schuyler (m. 1871)
- Children: Elizabeth Ashmead Schaeffer
- Parent(s): Charles William Schaeffer; Elizabeth Fry Ashmead
- Education: University of Pennsylvania; Lawrence Scientific School; University of Göttingen

Charles Ashmead Schaeffer (August 14, 1843 – September 23, 1898) was a chemist who served as the seventh President of the University of Iowa, serving from 1887 to 1898.

== Early life ==
Schaeffer was born on August 14, 1843, in Harrisburg, Pennsylvania. He was the son of Rev. Charles William Schaeffer, the prominent Lutheran clergyman, and Elizabeth Fry Ashmead Schaeffer.

Schaeffer graduated from the University of Pennsylvania in 1861. From 1863 to 1865, he studied at Lawrence Scientific School at Harvard University. He received his PhD from the University of Göttingen in 1868.

== Career ==
From 1887 to 1898, Schaeffer served as the seventh President of the University of Iowa.

== Personal life ==
Schaeffer was married to Evelyn Schuyler (1846–1942), the daughter of George W. Schuyler, who served as New York State Treasurer, and sister of Eugene Schuyler, the writer and diplomat. Together, they were the parents of four children, including:

- Elizabeth Ashmead Schaeffer (1872–1945)

Schaeffer died unexpectedly at the age of 55 in Iowa City, Iowa.

Academic offices
Preceded by Josiah Little Pickard	President of the University of Iowa; 1887–1898	Succeeded by Amos Noyes Currier (acting); George Edwin MacLean
