= David Frederick Schaeffer =

David Frederick Schaeffer (born in Carlisle, Pennsylvania, 22 July 1787; died in Frederick, Maryland, 5 May 1837) was a Lutheran clergyman of the United States.

== Biography ==
His parents were Frederick David Schaeffer and Rosina Rosenmiller. His father was a Lutheran clergyman, as were his brothers Frederick Christian, Charles Frederick, and Frederick Solomon, and his nephew Charles William. He graduated from the University of Pennsylvania in 1807, studied theology with Justus Henry Christian Helmuth, John Frederick Schmidt, and his father, and was ordained by the Pennsylvania Ministerium in 1812, though he had received his license to preach in 1808. In 1808 he became pastor of the Evangelical Lutheran congregation at Frederick, Maryland, where he remained for the rest of his life.

== Activities ==
A ministerial challenge in his times was the development of English-language worship as an alternative to the hitherto exclusive use of the German language. Schaeffer was one of the leaders in this effort.

He was an able theologian, always having students under his direction, among whom were his brothers Frederick Christian and Frederick Solomon. Two other distinguished students were Emanuel Greenwald and Charles Philip Krauth. He was connected with all the important enterprises of his own church and with many outside of it.

From 1826 until 1831 he was the editor of the first English-language periodical that was established in the Lutheran church in the United States, the Lutheran Intelligencer. He took an active part in the establishment of the Lutheran Theological Seminary at Gettysburg, Pennsylvania, in 1826, was one of the founders of the general synod of the Lutheran church (1821), secretary in 1821-29, and its president in 1831-33. In 1836 he received the degree of D.D. from St. John's College, Annapolis, Maryland. Besides a large number of doctrinal and other articles in the Lutheran Intelligencer, he published various addresses and sermons.

His reputation was based mostly on his work as a pastor. Illness and the death of his wife were difficulties of his later years, as was the Maryland Synod, which sanctioned him for intemperance.

== Family ==
He married Elizabeth Krebs of Philadelphia in 1810. They had six children.
