= Sheffer =

Sheffer is a surname, and may refer to:

- Alla Sheffer, Israeli-Canadian computer scientist
- Craig Sheffer (born 1960), American actor
- Daniel Sheffer (1783–1880), U.S. congressman
- Doron Sheffer (born 1972), Israeli basketball player
- Henry M. Sheffer (1882–1964), American logician
- Hogan Sheffer (1958–2019), American screenwriter
- Isador M. Sheffer (1901–1992), American mathematician
- Walter Sheffer (1918–2002), American photographer

== See also ==
- Schaeffer
- Shefer
