= Elizabeth Fry Ashmead Schaeffer =

Founder of the Lutheran Home at Germantown for Orphans

Elizabeth Fry Ashmead Schaeffer (E.F.A. Schaeffer) (February 16, 1812 in Philadelphia, Pennsylvania – November 2, 1892 in Philadelphia, Pennsylvania), was the founder of the Lutheran Home at Germantown for Orphans and an active leader of many ministries of the Lutheran Church in Philadelphia. She was the wife of Rev. Charles William Schaeffer and mother of four children.

== Early history ==
Elizabeth was born in Philadelphia, Pennsylvania on February 16, 1812, in the Germantown area. Her parents were James Ashmead and Eve Frey (Fry). Elizabeth was baptized at St. Michael's Lutheran Church in Germantown on May 18, 1812. She had five older siblings, (John, William, Anna, James and Charles) and two younger siblings (Catherine and George). Elizabeth and George (born in 1818) would grow up to be very close friends and business partners.

Elizabeth was confirmed at St. Michael's in 1825 by Rev. John C. Baker. In 1826, her mother Eve, died at the age of fifty-three.

In 1828, Rev. Baker was called to Trinity, Lancaster and the new pastor, Rev. Benjamin Keller was called to St. Michael's. This move would be very important in Elizabeth's life because along with this new pastor came her future husband, Charles W. Schaeffer. Charles' father died when he was two and so his mother, Catherine, remarried Rev. Keller and by the time they moved to Germantown, Charles was confirmation age.

== Early career ==
As Rev. Keller began his service at St. Michael's, issues of women's role and their place in the church began to arise. In December, 1833, Elizabeth was a key leader in a meeting of women and men to develop a missionary and education society at St. Michael's. They submitted a constitution to Rev. Keller to take before the congregation and on January 22, 1834, the Female Domestic Missionary and Education Society of the Evangelical Lutheran Church of St. Michael's Germantown was born.

Elizabeth was elected the first secretary of the society and held the position until 1837, until she was forced to step down because of her marriage to, the now ordained, Rev. Charles W. Schaeffer (married in 1836). He was ordained at St. Michael's in 1835 but served at Barren Hill and Whitemarsh parish.

Elizabeth's resignation from the society and departure from St. Michael's came around the same time that Rev. Keller was asked to resign by the congregation due to issues around using German or English during the worship services and issues over whether or not women could vote in religious settings. Afterwards, Elizabeth attended Barren Hill and Whitemarsh with her husband, Charles W. Schaeffer. There is strong indication that she assumed strong leadership roles in every congregation that her husband served and she was the head of many benevolent organizations throughout the years. In 1841, she and Rev. Schaeffer moved to Harrisburg where they became the parents of two sons and two daughters: Katherine, Charles, Eva, and William.

In 1849, St. Michael's Germantown had moved to an all English speaking worship service and were in need of a pastor. It took months to fill and but they finally called Rev. Charles W. Schaeffer and Elizabeth. Elizabeth would resume her leadership roles in the Missionary and Education Society and lead it in a new direction with the creation of an Orphan's Home.

== Founding the Lutheran Home at Germantown ==
=== The Story of the First Dollar ===
As Elizabeth began to increase her role in leadership at St. Michael's, she and her husband were visited by the Rev. William A. Passavant on his way to the Ministerium of Pennsylvania. Passavant was known for his work in developing social ministries and he had recently opened an Orphan's Home in Pittsburgh, PA. Depending on the account it differs as to which one made the original suggestion, but in talking Rev. Passavant and Elizabeth came to the conclusion that Philadelphia also needed an Orphans' Home. And so, Passavant said to her, "Now, everything must have a beginning: I will give you the first dollar." Elizabeth placed that dollar in her knitted purse and began working tirelessly to start the Lutheran Home at Germantown for Orphans.

=== Opening and Leadership ===
The Home opened on March 12, 1859, and it was clear that at first the Home was managed by women under the leadership of Elizabeth. She had the chief administrative role as director and treasurer. Other women helped to manage the home around her and would meet with her weekly to sew and help with other needs for the children.

On May 1, 1860, a constitution and by-laws were finalized, officers were elected and an application was sent to the state for incorporation for the Home. Two ladies were to be chosen by each of the local Lutheran congregations to be representatives to constitute the Board of Lady Managers. While the Board of Trustees constituted of mostly men (other than Elizabeth Schaeffer as the director), it was especially stipulated that the board of trustees were not to interfere with the domestic affairs of the Home but that responsibility fell to the Board of Lady Managers. This included the hiring and firing of all staff, the selection of orphans and, the supervision of staff, including matron, nurses, and servants. Elizabeth Schaeffer saw over everything. She presided over the Household Committee of the Board of Managers and held the position of treasurer of the Home, looking over income and expenditures.

=== Changing Roles ===
In 1864, as the amount of orphans increased and Elizabeth's role was changing Elizabeth's brother, George Ashmead, took over as treasurer. The amount of orphans being received rose drastically because of the number of children orphaned due to the conflict of the Civil War. As of July 1865 there were 68 orphans, October 2nd there were 107, and by the next April there were 131 orphaned children.

Due to the increase in children, the board of trustees decided to construct additional buildings. Elizabeth played a large role in as she led several fundraising events, like a great fair in 1869.

Due issues of finances and debt, the board of trustees decided to disband the Board of Lady Managers and give direct management of the Home to the Ministerium of Pennsylvania. Elizabeth had always opposed the transfer to the Ministerium but many family and friends disagreed with her. On April 9, 1872, the legislature approved the change and it was announced to the Board on May 16, 1872, although Elizabeth was not present. The Board of Lady Managers was disbanded and a new one, the Board of Lady Visitors, was created to support the children of the Home, at which point a new president was elected, Mrs. Mary Steiner.

Although she had firmly opposed the transfer to the Ministerium, Elizabeth remained active in the Home as a fundraiser and worked with the Board of Lady Visitors, even becoming the President again in 1878.

== Time at the seminary ==
When the Lutheran Theological Seminary at Philadelphia opened in 1864, Elizabeth's husband's uncle, Charles F. Schaeffer was the head of the faculty and the only full-time professor. During this time, the women of the Lutheran congregations of Philadelphia became active in assisting the institution. The women, including Elizabeth, sent a letter to the new board encouraging the creation of a women's committee to "superintend and regulate the domestic departure of the institution." The women helped to make significant improvements to the campus. In 1872, a new building was erected and ladies from congregations all around contributed furniture and hosted an open house.

In 1875, Charles W. Schaeffer was elected as the Burkhalter Professor at the Seminary and he and Elizabeth and their family moved closer to the seminary at 4784 Germantwon Ave. This is where Elizabeth would spend her remaining years, just a few houses down from where she was born.

== Death and remembrance ==
Elizabeth Fry Ashmead Schaeffer died on November 22, 1892. After her death the board of the Germantown Home passed a resolution:

Resolved, that while we humbly bow to our Father's will and gratefully acknowledge His goodness in permitting Mrs. Schaeffer to serve Him so long and so faithfully in this life, we pray that her example may stimulate others to follow in her steps, as she followed Christ.

In 1903, the Schaeffer-Ashmead Memorial Chapel was constructed at the Lutheran Theological Seminary at Philadelphia in honor of Elizabeth Fry Ashmead Schaeffer and her husband and Professor Rev. Charles W. Schaeffer. The Memorial was given by their son, Rev. William Ashmead Schaeffer (missionary superintendent of the Ministerium of Pennsylvania), and their daughter, Katie Schaeffer.
