= George Edwin MacLean =

American university president (1850–1938)

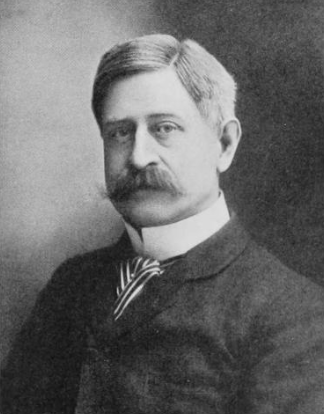
- Born: August 31, 1850; Rockville, Connecticut, US
- Died: May 3, 1938 (aged 87); Washington, D.C., US
- Education: Williams College; Yale University; Leipzig University
- Occupation: Educator
- Spouse: Clara S. Taylor (m. 1874)

Signature
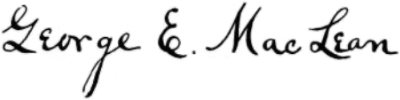

George Edwin MacLean (August 31, 1850 – May 3, 1938) was an American college administrator who served as president of the University of Iowa and chancellor of the University of Nebraska.

== Biography ==
George Edwin MacLean was born in Rockville, Connecticut, on August 31, 1850.

He was an alumnus of Williams College (A.B. 1871, A.M. 1874, LL.D. 1895), Yale (B.D. 1874), and Leipzig (Ph.D. 1883). From 1884 to 1895 he was a professor of English language and literature at the University of Minnesota. From 1895 to 1899 he was the sixth chancellor of the University of Nebraska. He became the eighth president of the University of Iowa in 1899 and served until 1911.

He married Clara S. Taylor on May 20, 1874. MacLean died at his home in Washington, D.C., on May 3, 1938.

In 1969, the Mathematical Sciences Building at the University of Iowa was renamed MacLean Hall in his honor.

Academic offices
Preceded by Amos Noyes Currier (acting); Charles Ashmead Schaeffer	President of the University of Iowa; 1899–1911	Succeeded by John Gabbert Bowman
