= Ludwick Institute =

School for "idigent" children

Ludwick Institute, originally the Philadelphia Society for the Free Instruction of Indigent Boys, was an educational organization in Philadelphia that established public school for economically disadvantaged children. Established in 1799 for boys, it was chartered in 1801 by the Philadelphia Society for the Establishment and Support of Charity Schools. It became co-educational in 1811. In 1872 it was named for its benefactor, Christopher Ludwick. It ceased operations in 1890 with the advent of public schools in Philadelphia but continued to sponsor lectures.
