= Double entendre =

Wording that is devised to be understood in two ways

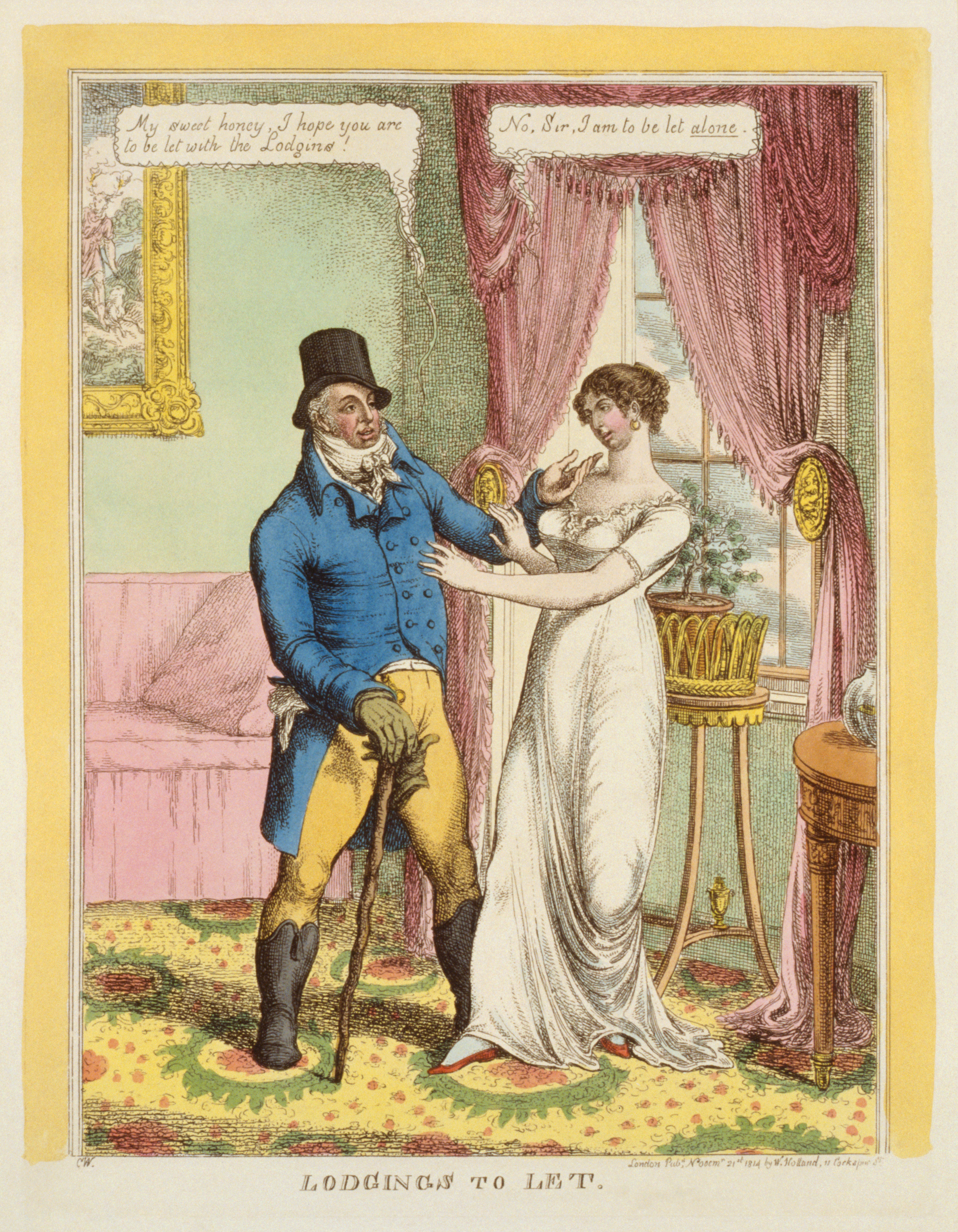
Lodgings to Let, an 1814 engraving featuring a double entendre. He: "My sweet honey, I hope you are to be let with the Lodgins!" She: "No, Sir, I am to be let alone."

A double entendre (Note: The word double is often pronounced as in English and the second word with no nasalization at all, but some speakers attempt various degrees of imitation of French pronunciation for the second word, and then they tend to pronounce the first word as in French too. So pronunciations range from /ˈdʌbəl ɒnˈtɒnd(rə)/ DUB-əl on-TOND(-rə) to /ˈduːb.l ɒ̃ˈtɒ̃d(rə)/ (from French [dubl ɑ̃tɑ̃dʁ]).) (plural double entendres) is a figure of speech or a particular way of wording that is devised to have a double meaning, one of which is typically obvious, and the other often conveys a message that would be too socially unacceptable, or offensive to state directly.

A double entendre may exploit puns or word play to convey the second meaning. Double entendres generally rely on multiple meanings of words, or different interpretations of the same primary meaning. They often exploit ambiguity and may be used to introduce it deliberately in a text. Sometimes a homophone can be used as a pun. When three or more meanings have been constructed, this is known as a "triple entendre", etc.

== Etymology ==
According to the Merriam-Webster Dictionary and the Oxford English Dictionary, the expression comes from the rare and obsolete French expression, which literally meant "double meaning" and was used in the senses of "double understanding" or "ambiguity", but acquired its current suggestive twist in English after being first used in 1673 by John Dryden. The phrase has not been used in French for centuries and would be ungrammatical in modern French. No exact equivalent exists in French, whose similar expressions (mot/expression à) double entente and (mot/expression à) double sens do not have the suggestiveness of the English expression.

== Structure ==
A person who is unfamiliar with the hidden or alternative meaning of a sentence may fail to detect its innuendos, aside from observing that others find it humorous for no apparent reason. Innuendo is often used in sitcoms and other comedy where some in the audience may enjoy the humour while being oblivious to its secondary meaning.

A triple entendre is a phrase that can be understood in any of three ways, such as in the back cover of the 1981 Rush album Moving Pictures which shows a moving company carrying paintings out of a building while people are shown being emotionally moved and a film crew makes a "moving picture" of the whole scene.

== Usage ==
=== Literature ===
In Homer's The Odyssey, when Odysseus is captured by the Cyclops Polyphemus, he tells the Cyclops that his name is Oudeis (ουδεις = No-one). When Odysseus attacks the Cyclops later that night and stabs him in the eye, the Cyclops runs out of his cave, yelling to the other Cyclopes that "No-one has hurt me!", which leads the other Cyclopes to take no action under the assumption that Polyphemus blinded himself by accident, allowing Odysseus and his men to escape.

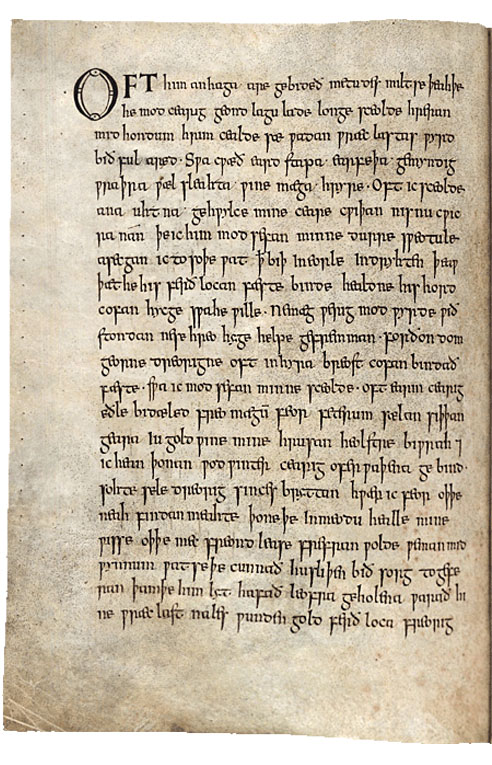
The first page of the poem "The Wanderer" found in the Exeter Book

Some of the earliest double entendres are found in the 10th-century Exeter Book, or Codex exoniensis, at Exeter Cathedral in England. In addition to the various poems and stories found in the book, there are also numerous riddles. Answers to the riddles were not included in the book, but have been found by scholars over the years. Some of these employ double entendres, such as Riddle 25:

I am a wondrous creature: to women a thing of joyful expectation, to close-lying companions serviceable. I harm no city-dweller excepting my slayer alone. My stem is erect and tall––I stand up in bed––and whiskery somewhere down below. Sometimes a countryman's quite comely daughter will venture, bumptious girl, to get a grip on me. She assaults my red self and seizes my head and clenches me in a cramped place. She will soon feel the effect of her encounter with me, this curl-locked woman who squeezes me. Her eye will be wet.

This suggests the answer "a penis" but also has the innocent answer "an onion".

Examples of sexual innuendo and double-entendre occur in Geoffrey Chaucer's The Canterbury Tales (14th century), in which the Wife of Bath's Tale is laden with double entendres. These include her use of the word "queynte" (modern spelling "quaint") to describe domestic duties while also alluding to genitalia ("queynte" being at the time an alternative form of "cunt", a term for the vulva).

The title of Sir Thomas More's 1516 fictional work Utopia is a double entendre because of the pun between two Greek-derived words that would have identical pronunciation. Spelled as it is, or especially spelled as "Outopia", the title means "no place"; meanwhile spelled as "Eutopia", with the same English pronunciation, it would mean "good place".

=== Stage performances ===
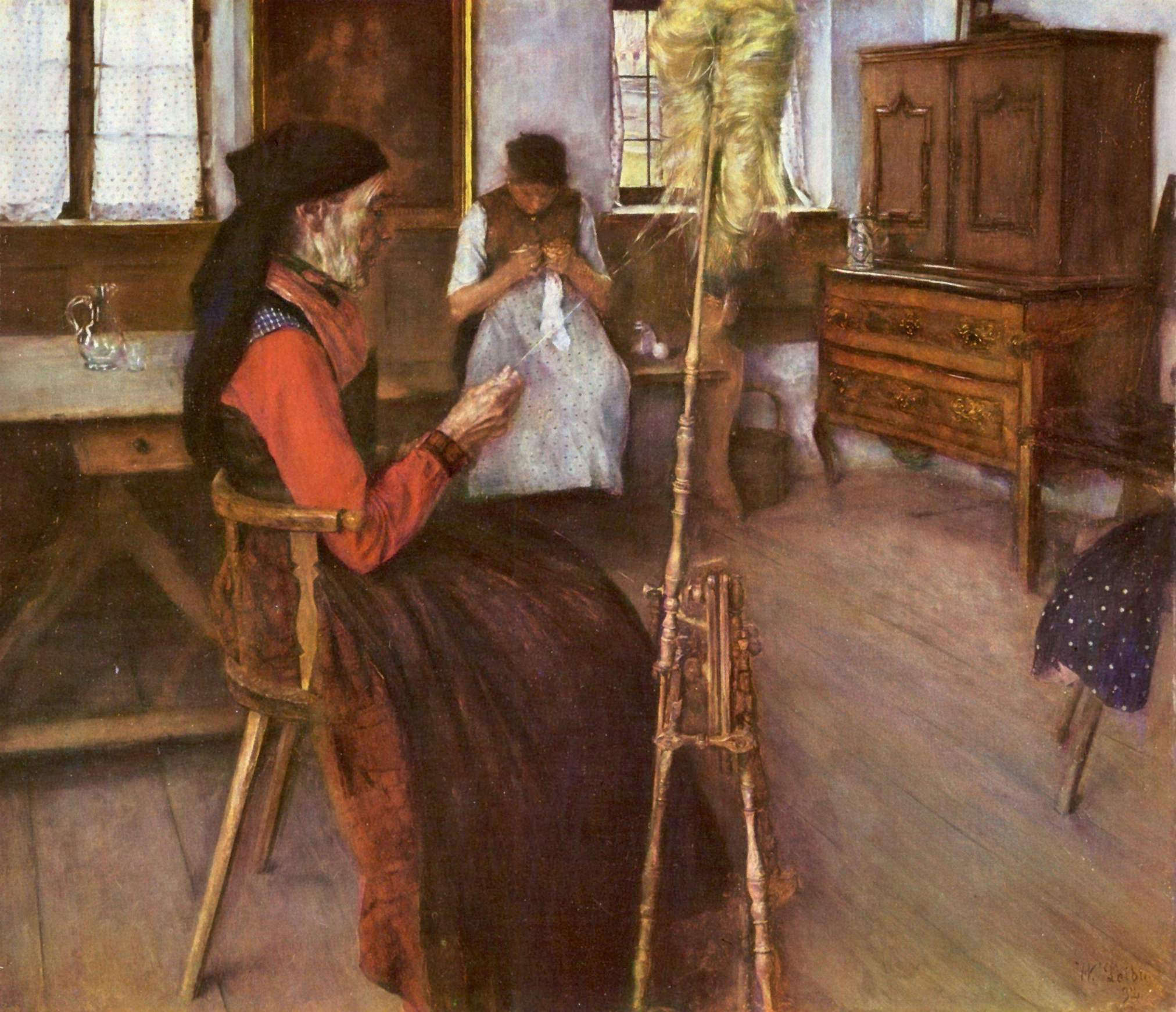
Flax on a distaff

Shakespeare frequently used double entendres in his plays. Sir Toby Belch in Twelfth Night says of Sir Andrew's hair, that "it hangs like flax on a distaff; and I hope to see a housewife take thee between her legs and spin it off"; the Nurse in Romeo and Juliet says that her husband had told Juliet when she was learning to walk that "Yea, dost thou fall upon thy face? Thou wilt fall backward when thou hast more wit"; or is told the time by Mercutio: "for the bawdy hand of the dial is now upon the prick of noon"; and in Hamlet, Hamlet publicly torments Ophelia with a series of sexual puns, including "country matters" (similar to "cunt"). The title of Shakespeare's play Much Ado About Nothing is a pun on the Elizabethan use of "no-thing" as slang for vagina.

In the UK, starting in the 19th century, Victorian morality disallowed sexual innuendo in the theatre as being unpleasant, particularly for the ladies in the audience. In music hall songs, on the other hand, this kind of innuendo remained very popular. Marie Lloyd's song "She Sits Among the Cabbages and Peas" is an example of this. In the early 20th century restrictions were placed on lewdness in performances, including some prosecutions. It was the job of the Lord Chamberlain to examine the scripts of all plays for indecency. Nevertheless, some comedians still continued to get away with it. Max Miller had two books of jokes, a white book and a blue book, and would ask his audience which book they wanted to hear stories from. If they chose the blue book, he could blame the audience for the lewdness to follow (in the UK, "blue" colloquially refers to sexual content, as in "blue jokes", "blue movies" etc.).

=== Radio and television ===
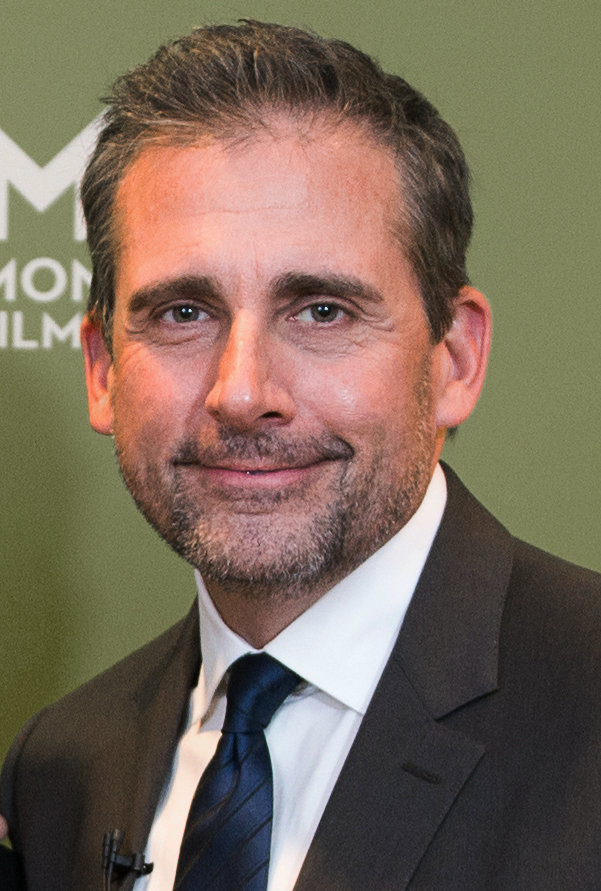
In The Office, Michael Scott (played by Steve Carell, pictured) often points out unintentional double entendres with the phrase "that's what she said".

In the United States, innuendo and double entendre were only lightly used in radio media until the 1980s when the Howard Stern Show began to push the envelope of what was acceptable on the radio through use of double entendre and ironies. This garnered so much attention it spawned an entire genre of radio called "shock jock radio" where DJs will push the limits of what is an "acceptable" double entendre to use over-the-air as the Federal Communications Commission has been known to hand out large fines for the use of double entendre on radio if they deem it to be in violation of their standards.

In Britain, innuendo humour began to transfer to radio and cinema in the late 1950s. Particularly significant in this respect were the Carry On series of films and the BBC radio series Round the Horne; although some of Round the Horne appeared to be nonsense language, the protagonists were sometimes having "rude" conversations in Polari (gay slang). Round the Horne depended heavily on innuendo and double entendre, the show's name itself being a triple entendre, a play on the name of its central actor Kenneth Horne and those around him, the sailor's expression "going round the horn" (i.e. Cape Horn), and the fact that "horn" is slang for an erection. Spike Milligan, writer of The Goon Show, remarked that a lot of "blue" (i.e. sexual) innuendo came from servicemen's jokes, which most of the cast understood (they all had been soldiers) and many of the audience understood, but which passed over the heads of most of the Senior BBC producers and directors, most of whom were "Officer class".

In 1968, the office of the Lord Chamberlain ceased to have responsibility for censoring live entertainment, after the Theatres Act 1968. By the 1970s, innuendo had become widely used across much of the British broadcast media, including sitcoms and radio comedy, such as I'm Sorry I Haven't a Clue. For example, in the 1970s TV comedy series Are You Being Served?, Mrs. Slocombe frequently referred to her pet cat as her "pussy", apparently unaware of how easily her statement could be misinterpreted, such as "It's a wonder I'm here at all, you know. My pussy got soakin' wet. I had to dry it out in front of the fire before I left". Someone unfamiliar with sexual slang might find this statement funny simply because of the references to her sodden cat, whereas others would find further humour in the innuendo ("pussy" being sexual slang for vulva).

Modern comedies, such as the US version of The Office, often do not hide the addition of sexual innuendos into the script; for example, main character Michael Scott often deploys the phrase "that's what she said" after another character's innocent statement, to turn it retroactively into a sexual pun.

On The Scott Mills Show on BBC Radio 1, listeners are asked to send in clips from radio and TV with double meanings in a humorous context, a feature known as "Innuendo Bingo". Presenters and special guests fill their mouths with water and listen to the clips, and the last person to spit the water out with laughter wins the game.

=== Movies ===
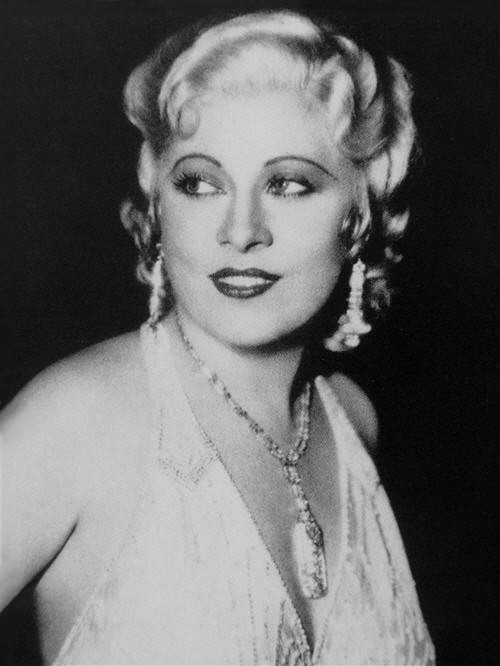
Mae West was famous for her risqué double entendres.

Double entendres are popular in modern movies, as a way to conceal adult humour in a work aimed at general audiences. The James Bond films are rife with such humour. For example, in Tomorrow Never Dies (1997), when Bond is disturbed by the telephone while in bed with a Danish girl, he explains to Moneypenny that he is busy "brushing up on a little Danish". Moneypenny responds by pointing out that Bond was known as "a cunning linguist", a play on the word "cunnilingus". In the final scene of Moonraker, while Bond is taking Dr Holly Goodhead "round the world one more time", Q says to Sir Frederick Gray, "I think he's attempting re-entry, sir". In The World Is Not Enough (1999), while in bed with Dr Christmas Jones, Bond tells her "I thought Christmas only comes once a year". Other obvious examples include Pussy Galore in Goldfinger and Holly Goodhead in Moonraker. The double entendres of the Bond films were parodied in the Austin Powers series.

Bawdy double entendres, such as (from the movie Sextette) "I'm the kinda girl who works for Paramount by day, and Fox all night", and (from the movie Myra Breckinridge) "I feel like a million tonight – but only one at a time", are typical of the comedy writing of Mae West, for her early-career vaudeville performances as well as for her later plays and movies.

=== Music ===
There is a long tradition of double entendre songs in American blues music of the 1920s and 1930s, called hokum. Double entendres are very common in the titles and lyrics of pop songs, such as "If I Said You Had a Beautiful Body Would You Hold It Against Me" by The Bellamy Brothers. By one interpretation, the person being talked to is asked if they would be offended; by the other interpretation, they are asked if they would press their body against the person doing the talking.

Singer and songwriter Bob Dylan, in his somewhat controversial song "Rainy Day Women No. 12 & 35", repeats the line "Everybody must get stoned". In context, the phrase refers to the punishment of execution by stoning, but on another level it means to "get stoned", a common slang term for being high on cannabis. In their song "Big Balls" on the album Dirty Deeds Done Dirt Cheap, AC/DC the chorus "we've got big balls" can be read as referring to either formal dances or testicles. During the 1940s, Benny Bell recorded several "party records" that contained double entendre including "Everybody Wants My Fanny". Steven Tyler and Aerosmith released a cover single (later added to their third album, "Toys in the Attic") entitled "My Big Ten Inch" within which was a line, "I whipped out my big ten-inch...(pause)...record of my favorite blues..."

== See also ==
- Albur
- Coincidence
- Dirty Minds
- Doublespeak
- Dangling modifier
- Euphemism
- Iham
- Paraprosdokian
- Spoonerism
- Ribaldry
