= Amos Noyes Currier =

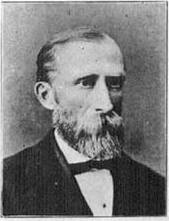
- Born: 3 October 1832
- Died: 16 May 1909 (aged 76)

Amos Noyes Currier (October 3, 1832 in Canaan, New Hampshire– May 16, 1909) was the acting President of the University of Iowa from 1898 to 1899.

Academic offices
Preceded by Charles Ashmead Schaeffer	Acting President of the University of Iowa; 1898–1899	Succeeded by George Edwin MacLean
