= Charles Schaeffer School =

- U.S. National Register of Historic Places
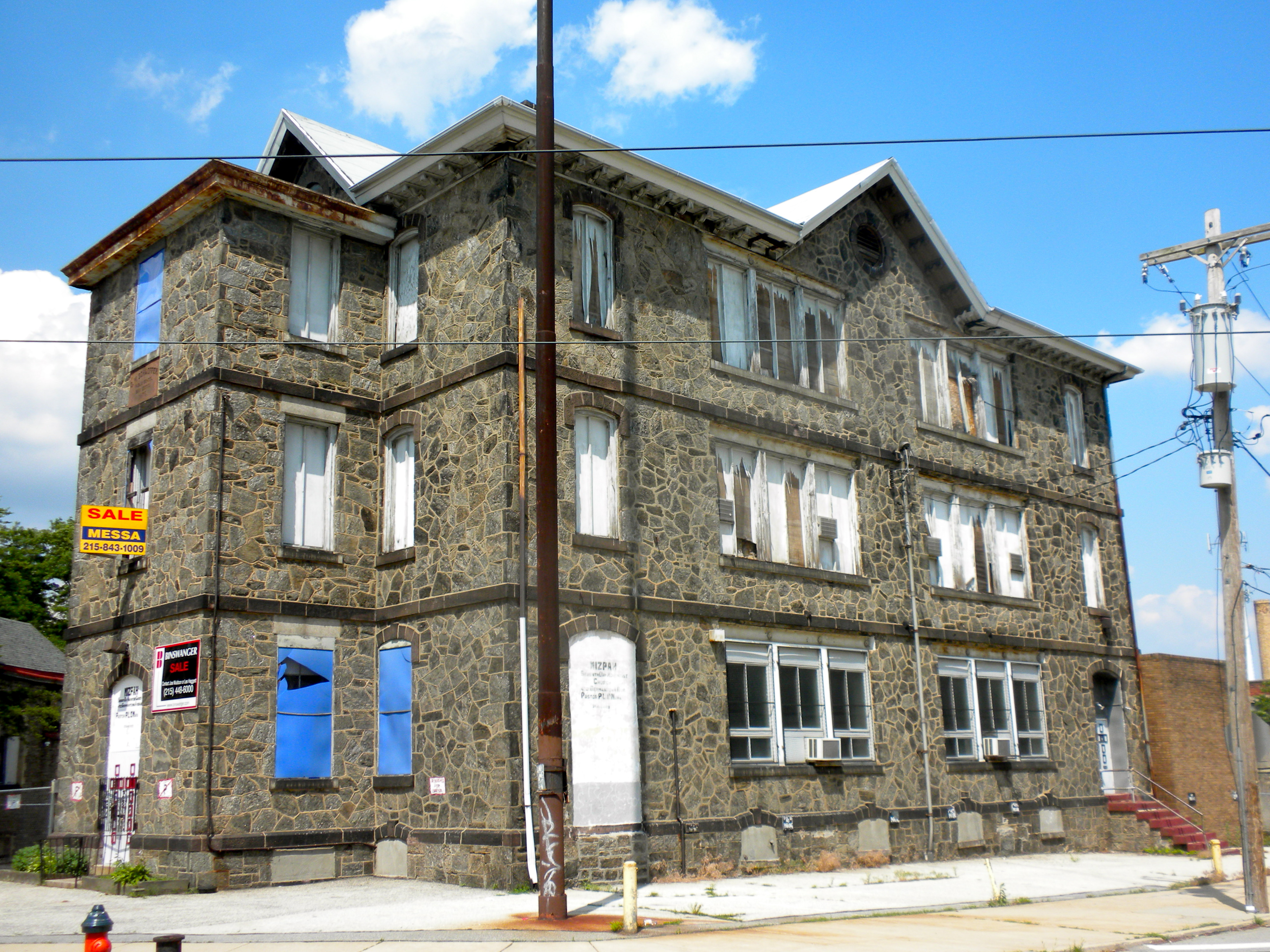
- Charles Schaeffer School, June 2010

- Location within Philadelphia Location within Pennsylvania Location within the United States
- Location: 4701 Germantown Avenue; Philadelphia, Pennsylvania 19144
- Coordinates: 40°1′38″N 75°9′38″W
- Area: 9 acres (3.6 ha)
- Built: 1876, 1914
- Built by: P.H. Somerset (1876); Keller & Company (2019)
- Architect: Louis H. Esler (1876); Seiler + Drury Architecture (2019)
- Architectural style: Gothic
- Restored: 2019
- Restored by: Philly Office Retail
- MPS: Philadelphia Public Schools TR
- NRHP reference No.: 86003327
- Added to NRHP: December 4, 1986

Charles Schaeffer School is a historic former school building located in the Germantown neighborhood of Philadelphia, Pennsylvania. The building was renovated in 2019 and is now the corporate offices of the Philly Office Retail real estate company.

== C.W. Schaffer School ==
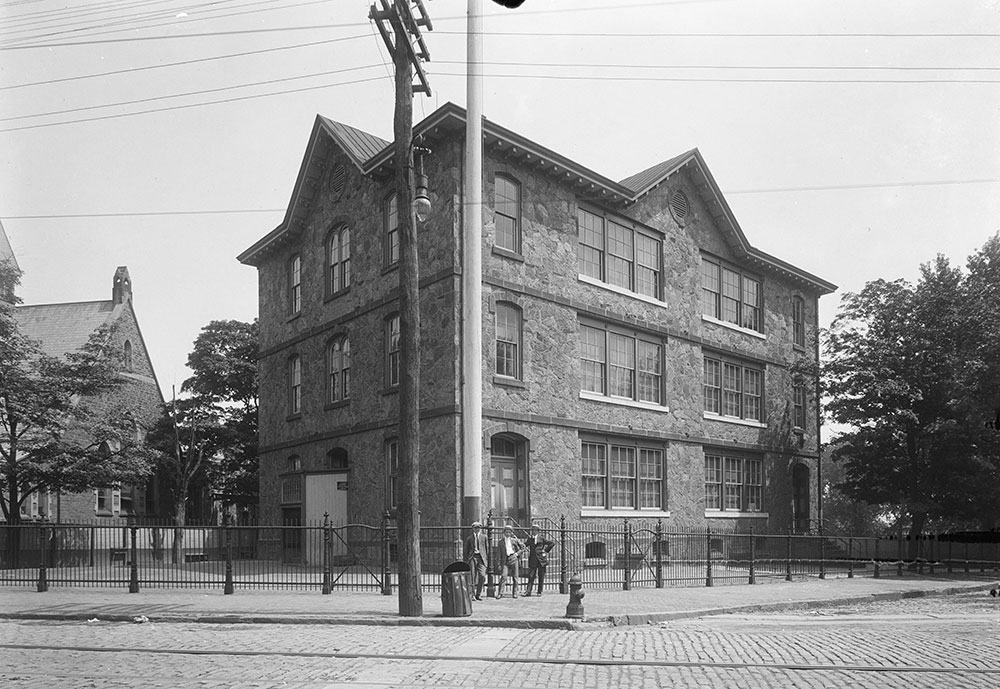
Charles W. Schaeffer Public School, August 3, 1913

The school was built in 1876 by the School District of Philadelphia, and is a 3 1/2-story, schist building in the Gothic-style. It features brownstone trim, a pedimented gable roofline, molded cornice with decorative brackets, and a three-story projecting front section added in 1914.

It was called the C. W. Schaeffer Combined Secondary and Primary School in honor of Charles William Schaeffer, a Lutheran theologian who grew up in Germantown.

The Samuel P Freeman auction house advertised the sale of the building by order of the Board of Education to take place on May 27, 1953. In October 1953, the Philadelphia Board of Education approved the construction for $800,000 the John Wister School on Bringhurst St to replace the Schaeffer School which had been abandoned as well as the Wistar School which would be razed.

The building was added to the National Register of Historic Places in 1986.

== Renovation and Current Use ==
In July 2011, the school building was purchased from the Mitzpah Seventh Day Adventist Church. Mitzpah had owned both the school and the adjacent Wakefield Presbyterian Church, but abandoned them to move into a larger historic church, the former Frankford Baptist Church (1853–1855) at 4357 Paul Street.

Philly Office Retail renovated the property and moved its headquarters into the building in 2019. The Preservation Alliance for Greater Philadelphia recognized Philly Office Retail with a grand jury award in September 2020 for its renovation of the building which respected and preserved its historic character.
