= Thomas Francis Miller =

American architect (1863–1939)

- Born: 1863; Cecil County, Maryland, U.S.
- Died: February 11, 1939 (aged 75–76); Swarthmore, Pennsylvania, U.S.
- Resting place: Cedar Hill Cemetery
- Occupation: Architect

Thomas Francis Miller (1863 – February 11, 1939) was an American born architect based in Philadelphia, Pennsylvania, in the late 19th and early 20th centuries. He primarily designed churches and speculation housing in Philadelphia.

== Early life ==
Thomas Francis Miller was born in Cecil County, Maryland. He graduated from Central High School in Philadelphia.

== Career ==
Miller was president of the road commission of Montgomery County. He built a number of churches in the Gothic Revival Style. Miller appears in the Philadelphia city directories from 1883 to 1908, first as a draftsman (1883-1884) and then as an architect from 1885 onward. His office addresses included: 615 Walnut Street (1887-1890); 1221 Arch Street (1891-1897); 1219 Arch Street (1898); the Lippincott Building (1899-1904); 1126 Walnut Street (1905-1907); and 908 Walnut Street (1908).

== Personal life ==
Miller married Evelene Garsed, daughter of Ellen Garsed, on February 25, 1892. They had two daughters, Mrs. Herschel G. Smith and Mrs. George A. Slifer.

Miller died on February 11, 1939, at Strath Haven Inn in Swarthmore, Pennsylvania. He was buried in Cedar Hill Cemetery.

== Projects ==
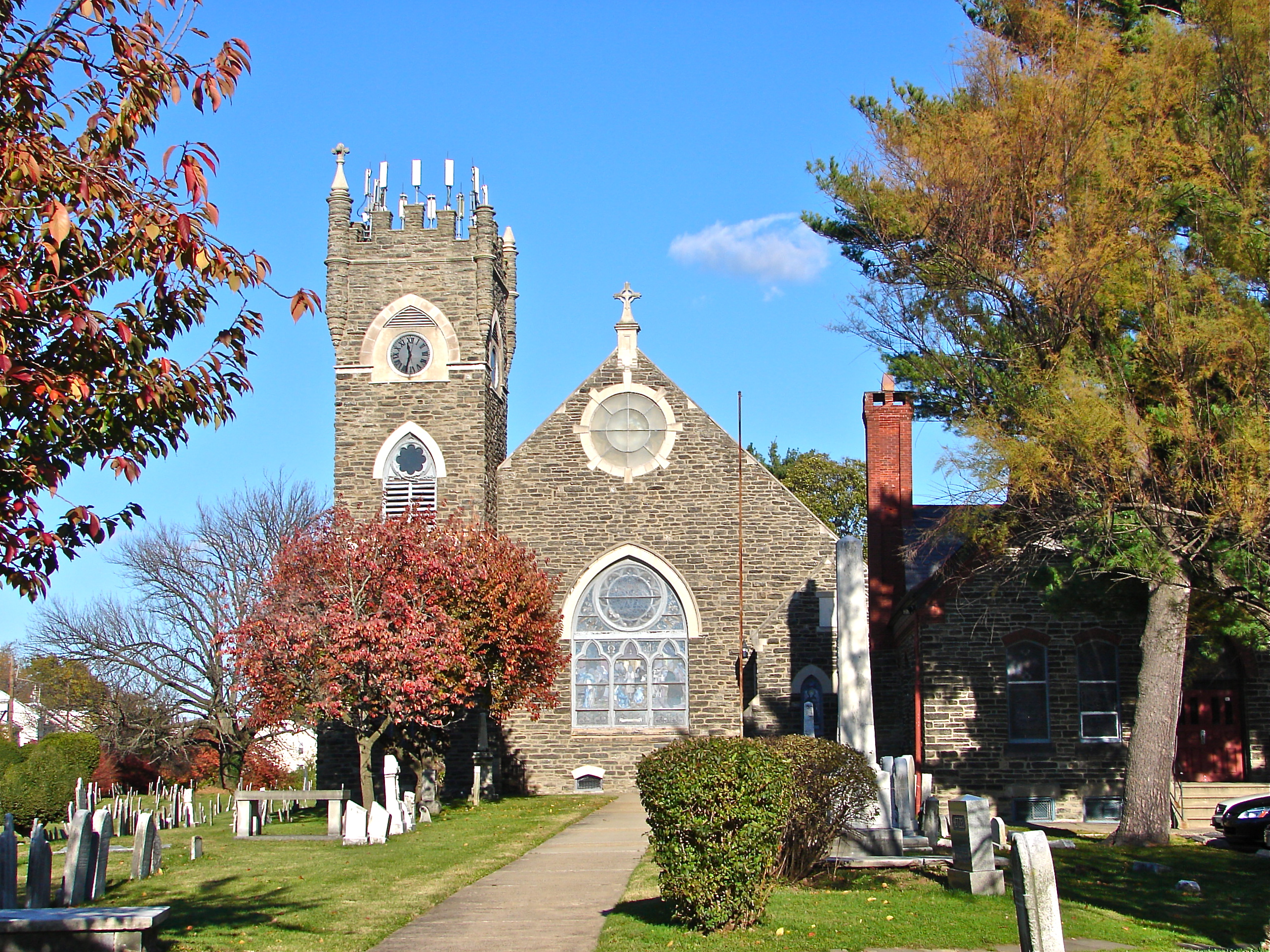
St. Michael's Lutheran Church, Germantown

- William Weber Johnson House, Fort Washington, PA (1880)
- Stillwagon Residence, Upper Dublin, PA (1887)
- African Episcopal Church of St. Thomas, Philadelphia [demolished] (1889)
- Zion (German) Lutheran Church, Philadelphia (1890)
- Odd Fellows Hall, Paschalville, Philadelphia (1890)
- Merchant's National Bank, Bangor, PA (1890)
- Bank in Sunbury, PA
- West Hope Presbyterian Church, Philadelphia (1892)
- St. Michael's Lutheran Church, Germantown (1896)
- Willow Grove High School, Willow Grove, PA
- American Legion Building, Willow Grove, PA
- Church of the Good Shepherd, Kensington, Philadelphia [demolished] (1889)
- Spruce Street Baptist Church, Philadelphia (Renovations) (1901)
- Schaeffer-Ashmead Memorial Lutheran Church/Chapel of the Lutheran Theological Seminary of Philadelphia (1902)
- Lutheran Church of Our Saviour, Philadelphia (1904)
- First Reformed Church, Renovo, PA (1905)
- Spade Residence, Landsdowne, PA (1905)
- Beth Eden Lutheran Church, Philadelphia (1907)
- Weber House, Wyncote, PA (1909)
