= Cedar Hill Cemetery (Philadelphia) =

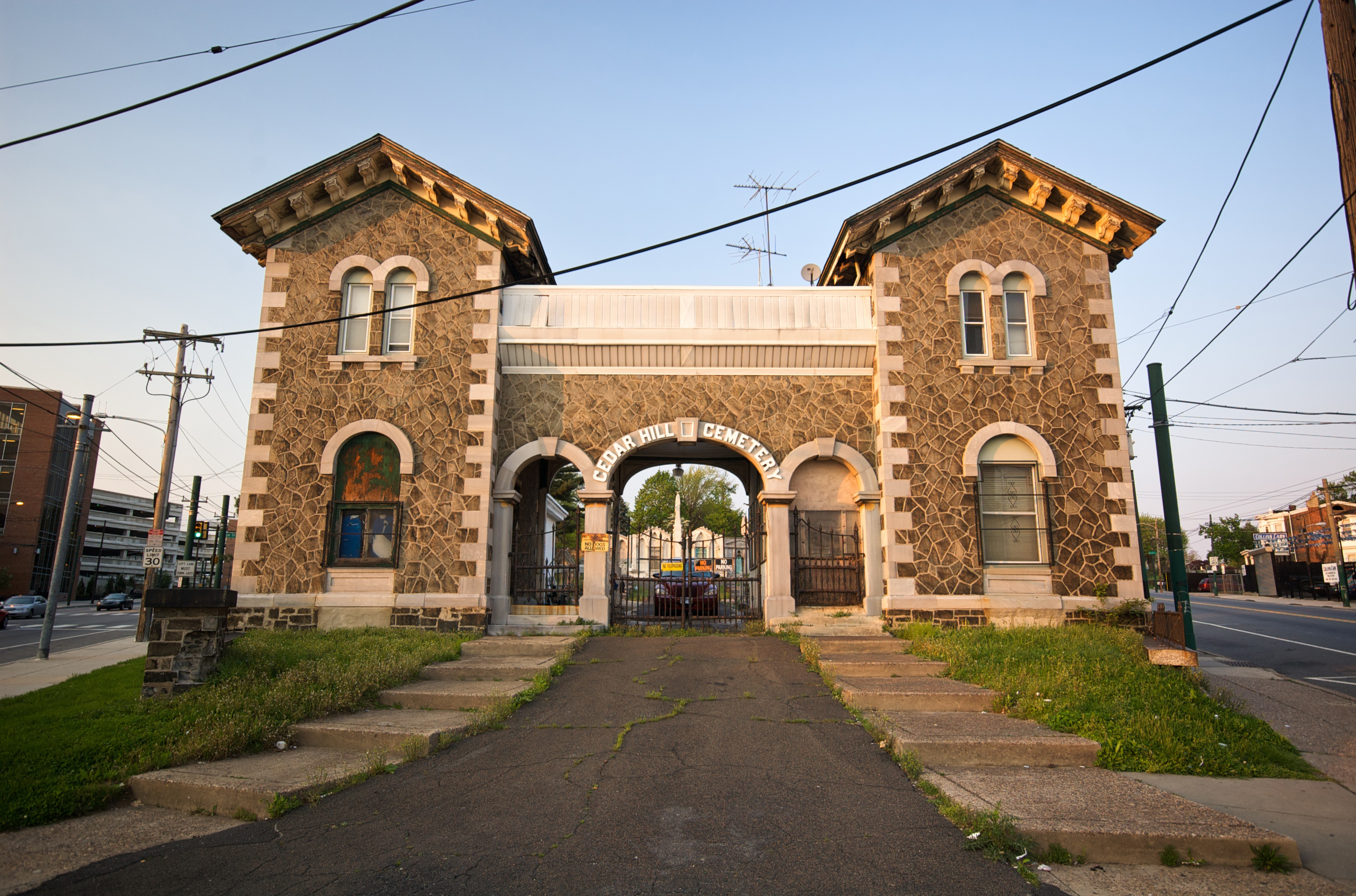
- Cedar Hill Cemetery gatehouse in 2010
- Interactive map of Cedar Hill Cemetery

Details
- Established: 1850
- Location: 5800 Frankford Ave. Philadelphia, Pennsylvania
- Country: United States
- Coordinates: 40°01′27″N 75°04′29″W
- Find a Grave: Cedar Hill Cemetery
- The Political Graveyard: Cedar Hill Cemetery

Cedar Hill Cemetery is a historic cemetery in the Frankford neighborhood of Philadelphia, Pennsylvania. It was established by a company incorporated on March 25, 1850. The main gatehouse was built in 1869.

== Notable interments ==
- Alexander Crawford (1842–1886), Medal of Honor recipient.
- William Walker Foulkrod (1846–1910), U.S. Representative from Pennsylvania.
- Thomas Francis Miller (1863–1939), architect
- George Quintus Shoch (1859–1937), major league baseball player.
- John Paul Verree (1817–1889), U.S. Representative from Pennsylvania.
