= Christopher Ludwick =

German-born American philanthropist (1720–1801)

Christopher Ludwick, known also as Ludwig (17 October 1720, in Germany – 17 June 1801, in United States), was a German immigrant to Philadelphia, Pennsylvania, and worked as a baker general for the Continental Army during the American Revolutionary War.

== Life in Europe and Philadelphia ==
Early in life, Christopher Ludwick enlisted in the Austrian Army and served in the Austro-Russian-Turkish War. He endured the hardships of a gruelling seventeen-week-long battle known as the Siege of Prague. When the French and Bavarians captured Prague in 1741, Ludwick was conscripted into the Prussian Army. When peace was finally declared, Ludwick decided to leave continental Europe. Ludwick arrived in England in 1742 and joined the British Royal Navy. He seems to have served as a baker aboard the H.M.S. Duke of Cumberland until 1745 and then served as a seaman in the merchant marine.

In 1753, he sailed for Philadelphia with £25 and some clothing. His time in Philadelphia was spent as a baker which proved to be very lucrative for him. With the £60 he had earned by this venture, Ludwick returned to London where he continued his work as a baker. Additionally, he learned a new trade of making very specialized cakes and confections for the wealthy people of London. Equipped with this new knowledge, he returned to Philadelphia the following year, and expanded his business as a gingerbread baker and confectioner located in Laetitia Court where he amassed a fortune. He married Catherine England in 1755. He owned 4 or 5 homes in the Philadelphia area and a farm in Germantown, Pennsylvania. Ludwick and his wife had one child who died in infancy.

== Role in American Revolutionary War ==
Ludwick was a staunch advocate of the American Revolution. When it had been proposed by Major General Thomas Mifflin to purchase firearms by private subscription or require the individual to buy his own guns, this caused some dissent among the American Patriots especially those who were unable to pay. Ludwick was able to silence their opposition by saying, “Let the poor, gingerbread baker be put down for £200!” The proposition was then adopted unanimously. In the summer of 1776, Ludwick enlisted as a volunteer at the age of 55.

Ludwick was of immeasurable service to the cause of the American Revolution by persuading his German countryman (Hessians) who were fighting on the side of Great Britain to desert and become residents of Philadelphia instead. Upon learning of the capture of eight Hessian soldiers who were taken as prisoners during the Battle of Germantown, Ludwick immediately went to the military headquarters for the American Patriots and convinced the commander-in-chief to place those eight men in his hands. Then, Ludwick took it upon himself to serve as their host and guide. He showed them all about Philadelphia and the surrounding vicinity. Ludwick was able to show these eight men how well the citizens of German heritage were prospering there. He pointed out how comfortably the German families of the area were housed and what fine churches they had. He spoke of the freedom and independence that they had to pursue their own avocations in Philadelphia without intrusion. When Ludwick dismissed those eight men, he charged them with the sole purpose of returning to their regiments to inform their fellow soldiers of all that they had seen. Ludwick encouraged them to describe to their comrades the advantages of leaving the British army and settling in Pennsylvania. It is said that Ludwick's influence on those eight men resulted in many Germans deciding to become citizens of Philadelphia, many of whom afterwards became prosperous citizens of the time.

Ludwick's success in this enterprise encouraged him to similar endeavors in that same vein. For example, he visited a Hessian camp on Staten Island, New York, without detection and was able to cause some of the German soldiers there to join him in Philadelphia, Pennsylvania.

== Baker General ==
Ludwick had originally learned the baking trade in his native city of Giessen. In 1777, he was appointed by the Continental Congress to the position of baker general to the American Army.

Christopher Ludwick was often invited to dine at George Washington's large dinner parties and frequently their conversations were in relation to the bread supplies for the Army. One of Ludwick's notable achievements was his prompt execution of General Washington's orders. Washington had defeated British Army Officer Charles Cornwallis at the Siege of Yorktown which ended on 19 October 1781. After the surrender of Cornwallis, General Washington ordered that Ludwick be responsible for feeding his hungry men. Ludwick baked 6,000 pounds of bread in one day with the help of his loving and supportive wife, Catherine England Ludwick. They were able to provide much-needed nourishment to the soldiers of Washington after that particularly long battle. That is just one instance, but Ludwick was able to keep the war machine of General Washington running because of that very simple, but appreciated staple - Bread! Washington usually addressed Ludwick in the company as “My honest friend.” In 1785, Ludwick was given a certificate of good conduct by General Washington which was written in his own handwriting. Washington realized the importance of Ludwick's invaluable service to the Army.

== Philanthropy ==
Ludwick spent a good deal of his later life in service to others. If he discovered that there were those in need of a worthwhile charity to which he could lend his assistance, he did as much as he possibly could to contribute either with his time or money in aiding their circumstance. In 1793, the city of Philadelphia was hit hard by the yellow fever epidemic. Ludwick worked tirelessly at baking bread, gratuitously, to feed those who were sick or destitute.

Upon his death in 1801 at the age of 81, Ludwick bequeathed $13,000 ($6,000,000 today) to fund a charitable trust “for the schooling and education gratis, of poor children of all denominations, in the city and liberties of Philadelphia, without exception to the country, extraction, or religious principles of their parents or friends.” Based in Bryn Mawr, the Christopher Ludwick Foundation remains active in its mission to the present day. He is buried in the cemetery of St. Michael's Lutheran Church.

His charitable donations were primarily awarded to several different organizations in the city of Philadelphia. Organizations such as the immigrant aid society Deutsche Gesellschaft von Pennsylvanien, the University of Pennsylvania, and two church charities for poor children received money from the Christopher Ludwick estate. The remainder of the estate in the amount of £3,000 was given to create a free school. In 1872, that school was named in his honour as the Ludwick Institute.
