= Church of the Good Shepherd, Kensington =

Coordinates: 39.982851°N 75.125015°W

- Church of the Good Shepherd, Kensington
- Location: Philadelphia, Pennsylvania
- Country: United States
- Denomination: Episcopal

History
- Status: Closed
- Founded: September 29, 1868
- Consecrated: January 21, 1892

Architecture
- Architect: T. Frank Miller
- Groundbreaking: November 19, 1889
- Construction cost: $13,400
- Closed: 2006
- Demolished: 2016

Administration
- Diocese: Pennsylvania

The Church of the Good Shepherd, Kensington, was an Episcopal congregation in Kensington neighborhood of Philadelphia, Pennsylvania. Founded in 1868, it merged with Emmanuel Church, Kensington, in 1994 to form the Church of Emmanuel and the Good Shepherd. Its 1887 building, designed by architect T. Frank Miller and located at 2121-2127 East Cumberland Street, was demolished in 2016. The Church of the Good Shepherd, Kensington, was an among the few surviving reminders of the mid to late 19th century English immigrant experience and community in Kensington and Philadelphia. Movement has been made to celebrate the colonial experience (i.e. Penn Treaty Park) and preserve the 19th century "new immigrant" experience (i.e. St. Laurentius Church, in Fishtown) in the greater Kensington area. Scholars often refer to this immigrant group as hidden and forgotten. These immigrants, to outsiders, blended in and disappeared. However, as the property demonstrates, mid to late 19th century English immigrants, far from being hidden, built unique neighborhoods, cultural institutions, and worship sites.

== History ==
The Protestant Episcopal Church of the Good Shepherd (Church of the Good Shepherd), Kensington, was organized on the Feast of St. Michael and All Angels, or Michaelmas, 29 September 1868, in the Frankford Market House, on the southwest corner of Frankford Avenue and Adams Street. This would be the first Episcopal parish in the City's 31st ward. The parish was incorporated in 1869 and admitted to the convention of the Episcopal Diocese of Pennsylvania on 13 May 1869. The Rev. John W. Claxton, rector of Church of the Advent, a high church/Anglo-Catholic parish located at 5th Street and York Avenue, served as rector while the Rev. A. A. Rickert, a deacon, oversaw the day-to-day activities of the new parish. The parish register begins 20 June 1869 and the first entry is a list of eighteen communicants. This list could be thought of as the founding members. The founding members of the parish are evenly drawn from Emmanuel Church, Kensington, and Free Church of St. John, Kensington. Save for one member who came from Emmanuel Church, Holmesburg. In 1870 the parish grew by four to twenty-two communicants however the parish's Sunday school had a bustling 205 children. Rickert continued to lead the parish until mid-1871 when illness prompted him to return to the West Indies.

After Rickert's departure, the vestry selected the twenty-six year old the Rev. John A. Goodfellow as their next rector. A Philadelphian by birth, Goodfellow had one year stints at St. John's Church, Camden, NJ, and St. Clement's Church, Wilkes-Barre, PA, before receiving the vestry's call. Goodfellow arrived in March 1872 and immediately went to work. During his first sermon he challenged the parish to raise to money to acquire a site and build their own house of worship. After the service, $300.00 was raised for this purpose. The fund-raising continued and that summer a parcel of land was secured at the intersection of East Cumberland and Collins Streets. The parcel was not purchased out right, rather the parish gained all rights to the land provided the parish pay an annual ground rent. This system of "ground rents", where perpetual property rights were exchanged for annual rent was typical in eighteenth and nineteenth century Philadelphia.

The following spring, of 1873, a large frame edifice, with seating for 500, was constructed at a cost of about $4000. The building also featured a vestry room and Sunday school rooms. The funds raised to construct this building were paid for by the congregants and kind well-wishers rather than the sale of pews, which was the typical method to fund the construction of Episcopal churches in this period. To make Church of the Good Shepherd, Kensington, a "free church," that is a church without pew rents is a deliberate social, philosophical and theological action on the part of Goodfellow. He was among the founders of the Free and Open Church Association, which was found in 1875, and served as the organization's general secretary for forty years. Many of those affiliated with the Association were influenced by the Anglo-Catholic movement within the Anglican Communion, and found it "increasingly difficult to reconcile the practice of private pew ownership or exclusive-use rental with their inclusive theology." The decision to disavow pew rents made theological sense, but they often made financial sense. The sale of pews provided the upfront costs to construct the church building and pew rents provided a constant and steady form of income to support the work of the parish. Without a reliable source of income, Church of the Good Shepherd found the cost of their annual ground rent a significant hardship. Writing to the Episcopal Diocese of Pennsylvania in 1876, Rev. Goodfellow suggested that "…if the liberal members of the church in this city would only come forward and help my parishioners, who are all poor, and are nearly employed in factories, to purchase the ground rent, the parish would become self-supporting at once."

In 1887, the debt owned for the ground rents was paid off and the congregation raised funds for the construction of a building designed by T. Frank Miller. The cornerstone was laid on 16 November 1889 and was consecrated by the Rt. Rev. Ozi W. Whitaker on 21 January 1892.

The evidence suggests that the founders of Church of the Good Shepherd and the Rev. John A. Goodfellow were influenced by Anglo-Catholic principles. The Anglo-Catholic movement within the Episcopal Church in the United States, as in the Church of England, emerged in the 1850s and 1860s. The impact of the movement cannot be overstated. The design of and the worship in Philadelphia's Episcopal churches changed in remarkable ways. A positive influence of the movement changed the Church's approach to the poor and downtrodden. In London, England, for example, a cluster of Anglo-Catholic parishes were found in the City's East End. Here one found "rough English poverty: the men employed as car-men, costermongers, and bootmakers, and in furniture making, silk weaving, glassblowing, and ‘gas-work." The very types of industrial workers that were found in Kensington. The arriving English, and to a lesser degree Protestant Irish, immigrants that worked in the textile mills near Frankford Avenue and Amber Street came from a stratum of British Society that was most impacted by Anglo-Catholicism since Anglo-Catholic clergy were most likely to work in the poorer and more industrial sections of England. It is in this industrial milieu that the young Rev. John A. Goodfellow attempted to build the parish. Similar to the London East End parishes who often relied on those outside of their parish to fund parish activities, so too did Goodfellow. He had to look toward the wealthy Center City Episcopalians to help finance the purchase of the land for the parish buildings as well as contribute toward the construction of the new building. The Anglo-Catholic priests who worked in London's East End were called slum-priests. It was a badge of honor since they attempted to minister to areas that others dared not tread. The term has not been applied to priests in the United States; however, the personality of Goodfellow exhibits the qualities found in these English slum-priests. He exhibited a zeal for soul saving that was almost evangelical in its earnestness, together with a demonstrable interest in the physical condition of their parishioners and a selflessness about he own wellbeing. Rev. Goodfellow served almost 61 years as rector the parish. During that time he baptized 2954 people, married, 1007 couples, and buried 2272. His success was measured less by large numbers of communicants than by a smaller but devoted congregation, and a large penumbra of goodwill and affection from people whom he served in other ways. He had rightfully earned the nickname - "Priest of Kensington."

The Church of the Good Shepherd is unique in the composition of its parishioners. The parish registers indicate a strong and significant presence of recent English immigrants, presumably drawn to by work opportunities around the parish. This is especially the case between 1880 and 1920. The Episcopal Diocese of Pennsylvania did not have a formalized ministerial outreach to these immigrants, unlike efforts to convert disaffected Italians and Polish Roman Catholics. In the absence of formalized mechanisms, Rev John A. Goodfellow, and Frank A. Longshore, the parish organist who held the position for over forty years, made deliberate and overt attempts to welcome English and to a lesser degree Anglican-Irish immigrants into the life and work of the parish. This work fell mostly to Longshore. Being around 1890, he began to meet steamships arriving from England and connecting Anglican immigrants to parishes in Philadelphia and beyond. This work became formalized in 1901 when the Episcopal Diocese of Pennsylvania recognized this ministry and appointed him lay chaplain to the City's immigration depot. Further he was appointed as the Philadelphia representative of the Church of England's Church Immigration Society, in 1905. In these roles, Longshore connected, mostly, English immigrants to temporary housing, religious communities, or assisted them to transportation facilitates if they were heading beyond Philadelphia. Although there is no evidence to suggest that Longshore steered English immigrants to Church of the Good Shepherd, the parish did benefit in terms of numbers thanks to these immigrants.

By the late 1860s, when Church of the Good Shepherd was founded, "could claim 124 carpet makers with 2,500 employees." Within a few years later, Kensington was also home to the "world's largest lace factory and the world's largest hat factory." These and other manufacturing enterprises created a level of economic stability. Kensington was not wealthy however this section of the city was a "stronghold of the respectable workingman and his family." Jobs were plentiful, albeit low paying. The neighborhood's economic foundation began to weaken around World War I. Factory owners started looking south for cheaper and un-unionized labor. A weakening situation was only exasperated by the onslaught of the Great Depression. In March 1931, a plea for temporary relief aid for the citizens of Kensington appeared in Church News of the Diocese of Pennsylvania, the situation in the community was described this way: "The great industrial section of Philadelphia in Kensington is out of work and suffering, desperately suffering in many cases, because the everywhere present large families of children of the mill workers are going without milk and groceries and in many cases clothing. It is believed by those who have studied the present labor condition out there that 80 percent of the textile workers are not receiving wages, because their work in the mills is closed indefinitely. There are over 300,000 Scotch, English, and Irish people in Kensington and about 450 mills, so you can make your own deduction in terms of hunger and personal discomfort at such a time as this."

Rev. John A. Goodfellow died at the age of 88 on 13 February 1933, just shy of his 61st anniversary as rector of the Church of the Good Shepherd. Goodfellow's successor, the Rev. Alex M. Keedwell, a young Anglo-Catholic priest who had served as curate at Church of the Good Shepherd, Rosement, found a congregation of 212 souls in steep decline. Around Kensington, banks continued to failed, factories remained idled and workers and families still starved. The Federal Writers Project described Kensington as:

"the massive faculty here dwarfs the rows of workers’ homes, which are tiny, in need of repair and unrelieved by any sign of vegetation. Most of them were built during the industrial boom in the early 1900s, but construction improvements during recent years left their dreariness unaltered. Although the Kensington population has remained virtually the same in its makeup for decades, there has been considerable migration out of the area by families whose incomes are now derived from employment in the landscaped ‘new technology’ plants in the Greater Northeast and the suburbs."

Those who could move did and those with fewer options remained. Some moved to other sections of the City yet remained connected to the parish while others simply disappeared. By the time of Keedwell's departure in 1940, only 169 congregants remained. Perhaps this situation was just too much for Rev. Keedwell to bear. He left Good Shepherd Kensington in just seven years.

The economic slide that began around World War I and was aggravated by the Great Depression paused slightly, during World War II. Young men went off to War and those who remained found jobs in the Port and revived manufacturing facilitates. However this boom was brief. The War ended and the post-war boom largely bypassed Kensington. Those who could move out did. Many who remained would leave if they could. Rev. David O. Trauger did his best to minister this neighborhood in flux. While it is true Church of the Good Shepherd grew under Trauger, to a high of 267 congregants in 1967, this growth is more likely to do with troubles at neighboring parishes. Although Good Shepherd retained its "whiteness" for it was among the last parishes to make any overtures toward the rapidly growing Puerto-Rican population. Additionally by Trauger's time, and in all likelihood long before, the concept of whiteness was associated with the Irish, Italian, and Polish ethnics rather than the types of people who sat in Good Shepherd's pews.

As the neighborhood continued to decline, the parish suffered dramatic losses of membership and vitality. In 1981 the Diocese of Pennsylvania formally yoked the parish with Emmanuel Church, Kensington. Together both parishes shared a priest and other expenses but maintained their own worship sites. That changed in 1994 when the parishes merged to become Church of Emmanuel and Good Shepherd, Kensington. The union failed to solve the long-term viability problems and the parish was one of several parishes closed in this section of the City in 2006.

== Architecture ==
The Protestant Episcopal Church of the Good Shepherd was the first known church commission for T. Frank Miller (1863-1939). This building presents the general principles of ecclesiastical design, which set the tone for his later work. In effect, the Protestant Episcopal Church of the Good becomes the prototype or master version of the religious buildings he would design later such as St. Michael's Lutheran Church, Germantown (1896) and the Chapel at Lutheran Theological Seminary, Mt. Airy (1902).

The Protestant Episcopal Church of the Good Shepherd, free of financial burdens, Rev. Goodfellow again turned his attention building construction. He argued that the church building "present[ed] a poor contrast to the new [Beacon Presbyterian], three squares away on the same street, and to other places of worship in the ward." Further he hoped a generous benefactor would "be God's instrument in the elevation of thousands of mill operatives in Kensington for generations to come…by building a new church for the only congregation of the Protestant Episcopal Church in the Thirty-First ward." Rev. Goodfellow did not stop there. He also wanted to raise funds for the construction of a parish house at the rear of the church He considered such a building an "absolute necessity in this large manufacturing ward (the Thirty-First) for the successful prosecution of the work of the church." Insufficient funds were raised for both projects and it was decided to focus solely on the church building. In 1889 Philadelphia architect T. Frank Miller was engaged to design the building. At a cost of about $20,000, the Philadelphia Inquirer described the design as:

...dark Yardleyville stone for a base course, which will be 5 feet high, with a light stone for the superstructure. The sides of the church will be in six bays with buttress and caps. The front of the building faces on Cumberland Street. At the west end of the front will be an entrance vestibule. In the gable, which is to be surmounted by a stone cross, will be a large rose window. The tower, is on the southwest corner of the building, will be 14 feet square and sixty feet high to the top of the iron cross, which rises from an oriel tower. Through the base of the tower another Gothic vestibule will be placed, making three entrances in all, the third being at the rear on Collins Street. A Gothic trussed roof will surmount the building, of open timber construction, covered with slate. The interior is to be finished in white ash."

The cornerstone was laid by the Rt. Rev. Ozi W. Whitaker, Bishop of Pennsylvania, on 16 November 1889. A newspaper article about the event adds these details about the building, "The chancel is to be placed on the north side of the building, extending to an alley; here also will be a handsome window of stained glass." The Church of the Good Shepherd was designed for a liturgy that focused on the Celebration of the Eucharist and incorporated formal liturgical practices that developed as a result of Ecclesiology and the larger Oxford Movement. Besides the gothic style of the building and the prominent rose window in the west end above triple lancet windows, the most significant Anglo-Catholic feature is found in the design of the choir stalls that accommodated forty choristers of men and boys. The insertion of the choir stalls in the nave reflected the particular emphasis on a more ceremonial liturgy and the importance of music commonly found in Anglo-Catholic parishes. The Ecclesiologists pushed for parishes to adopt this style of placement, which up to the Oxford Movement had only been found in the Great English cathedrals. Across Philadelphia, in 1869, it would have been more common to find choirs placed in the gallery, if the church had one, or in the pews near the front of the church – but not in the nave. These choristers, in keeping with Anglo-Catholic customs, were vested. The choir of the Church of the Good Shepherd was among the earliest of its kind in the City. Bishop Whitaker consecrated the new edifice on 21 January 1892. T. Frank Miller designed a new parish house in 1904. Unfortunately funding and other setbacks delayed the project for eight years. The cornerstone of the new parish house was laid on 19 October 1912. The two and a half story building included classroom space for the Sunday school and a gymnasium in the basement.

== Rectors ==
In the Episcopal Church, the rector is the priest elected to head a self-supporting parish.

Church of the Good Shepherd, Kensington

- Rev. John A. Goodfellow (1872-1933)
- Rev. Alexander Keedwell (1933-1938)
- Rev. David O. Trauger (1938-1980)
- Rev. Frederick F. Powers (1981-1986)
- Rev. James A. Sox (1986-1994)

Church of Emmanuel and Good Shepherd, Kensington

- Rev. James A. Sox (1994-2001)
