= Anthony Jacob Henckel =

German theologian

Anthony Jacob Henckel (German: Antonius Jacobus Henckel, October 27, 1668 – August 12, 1728) was a German theologian who founded the first Lutheran church in North America upon his immigration from Germany to Philadelphia's Germantown neighborhood.

== Family ==
Henckel had one older and four younger siblings. His mother and father were Anna Eulalia Dentzer and George Henckel. They were married on 2 May 1666. His father was a Lutheran school teacher.

Henckel was married to Maria Elizabeth Dentzer in Kirchhain on 25 April 1692. Together they had seven sons and five daughters, four of whom did not live past a young age.

== Life and work ==
Henckel was baptized on 27 December 1668. He enrolled in the University of Giessen on 5 May 1688 and finished his study of Theology on 16 January 1692.

=== German priesthood ===
Henckel was ordained on 28 February 1692 by pastor Johann Christopher Wild of Hoffenheim, and assumed the position of priest of the Eschelbronn parish, as well as the Mönchzell parish in 1693. In Eschelbronn he served as pastor of the Evangelical Lutheran Church of Eschelbronn until 1695, during which time he conducted eighteen baptisms, five weddings and thirty funerals. In 1695 he transferred to Daudenzell, where he served as parish priest until 1703. His successor in Eschelbronn was Josua Harrsch. In addition, Henckel served as priest for the parish of Kälbertshausen from 1699 to 1707.

In 1709 in the subsidiary parish Breitenbronn, Catholics attempted to occupy the Lutheran church. Henckel responded by reporting the incident to the consortium in Heidelberg, whereupon the church council referred him to the elector. As a result of the events, the Catholic government ordered a sharing of the church by Catholics and Protestants.

In 1714 Henckel assumed the parish priest position in Mönchzell again, and began the following year to work as a pastor in Neckargemünd. There he looked after the parishes in the greater Neckargemünd area in Meckesheimer Zent until 3 June 1717.

=== Immigration to Pennsylvania ===
In 1717 upon the invitation of William Penn, the founder of Pennsylvania, Henckel immigrated to New Hanover Township, where he likely arrived in September. The reasons for his immigration are assumed to be the re-catholicisation of the Pfalz and the penurious condition of the Lutheran church.

As one of the few Lutheran pastors in the region, he was particularly involved in the construction of schools and churches, thus contributing to the emergence of the Lutheran Church in Pennsylvania. In 1721 he founded the first Lutheran parish and witnessed the building of St. Michael's Lutheran Church in Germantown, a process for which Benjamin Franklin donated five schillings.

On 12 August 1728, Henckel died in the house of Herman Goothausen in Springfield from injuries resulting from falling off a horse earlier that day while en route to a hospital visit. He was buried in the cemetery in Germantown, where his gravestone still stands today. Until his will was found, it was uncertain whether Henckel died in 1728 or 1732.

Over generations, Henckel's descendants changed the spelling of their name to Henkel, Hinkel, Hinkle (changed in 1797) and Hinckel.

== Monuments ==
- Plaque on the Evangelical Church of Eschelbronn, erected 23 October 2010 at the fifth German-Pennsylvanian Association
- Memorial stone in the churchyard of St. Michael's Lutheran Church in Germantown, erected by Henckels' descendants in 1917

== Literature ==
- Marius Golgath: Von der Kurpfalz nach Pennsylvania – Die bewegende Lebensgeschichte des Kirchenpioniers Antonius Jacobus Henckel (1668–1728), 2013, ISBN 9783897357853 (German)
- Ann Gable: The Pastoral Years of Rev. Anthony Henckel, 1692-1717, 2011, ISBN 978-0-929539-89-8, Picton Pr
- Marius Golgath: Antonius Jacobus Henckel : Eschelbronner Pfarrer und Gründer der lutherischen Kirchengemeinde in Germantown/Pennsylvania, in Unser Land, 2006, Pages 215–217 (German)
