= Frederick David Schaeffer =

German-American Lutheran clergyman (1760–1836)

- Born: November 15, 1760; Frankfurt am Main in Hesse, Germany
- Died: January 27, 1836 (aged 75)
- Occupation: Lutheran clergyman

Frederick David Schaeffer (15 November 1760 – 27 January 1836) was a German-American Lutheran clergyman.

== Biography ==
Frederick David Schaeffer was born at Frankfurt am Main in Hesse, Germany. In 1768 he was sent to the gymnasium in Hanau. When both of his parents died, he left the gymnasium. In 1776 he emigrated with an uncle to the United States, but shortly after their arrival the uncle died, and he was left destitute. After teaching in York County, Pennsylvania, he studied theology with Rev. Jacob Goering (1755–1807). He was licensed by the Pennsylvania Ministerium in 1786 and ordained in the Lutheran ministry during 1788. Schaeffer became pastor of Lutheran congregations at Carlisle (1786–1790); Germantown (St. Michael's; 1790–1812), and from 1812 to 1834 was the colleague of Rev. Dr. Justus Henry Christian Helmuth in Philadelphia. He received the degree of D.D. in 1813 from the University of Pennsylvania. In 1834, in consequence of the infirmities of age, he relinquished the ministry, and moved to Frederick, Maryland.

== Works ==
- Antwort auf eine Vertheidigung der Methodisten, a response to the evangelists of the Second Great Awakening (Answer to a defense of the Methodists; Germantown, Pennsylvania, 1806)
- Eine herzliche Anrede (A heartfelt address, 1806)

== Family ==
In 1786, he married Rosina Rosenmiller, who died the year before he did. They had eight children, four of whom became Lutheran clergymen: David Frederick, Frederick Christian, Charles Frederick and Frederick Solomon. The last named died at 25, leaving a son, Charles William, to become a Lutheran clergyman.

== See also ==
- David Frederick Schaeffer, son
- Frederick Christian Schaeffer, son
- Charles Frederick Schaeffer, son
- Charles Schaeffer, grandson
