= Sandra Schaeffer =

American actress

Sandra Schaeffer (Bergeson; born in 1946) is an American singer, author and game inventor.

== Early career ==
Schaeffer graduated from North Central College in Naperville, Illinois, in 1968. In 1969 she replaced Madeline Kahn in the off-Broadway musical production of Promenade. She was one of the first college students ever to be hired into the chorus of the Lyric Opera of Chicago (as an alto), and later sang for the New York City Opera as a soprano, and sang a Spanish "zarzuela" directed by Tito Copobianco at City Center. She was a finalist for the lead in Broadway's Man of La Mancha and Two by Two by Richard Rogers.

== Comedy ==
After leaving New York, Schaeffer became a teacher and a mother, and resumed her career in the late 1970s as a singing telegram messenger for the "Hey!Wires" Singing Telegram Company in Chicago. She sang a telegram to President Ronald Reagan on national TV, a performance which included playing "Hail to the Chief" on the kazoo. During the 1970s, she sang the National Anthem for the Chicago Cubs on two occasions. She helped Hey!Wires owner co-write humorous lyrics for singing telegrams. They also co-wrote "The Preppy Comedy Album". Schaeffer wrote a Christmas song, Mrs. Santa, that spoofed being a wife and mother in the late 1970s.

== Films ==
Schaeffer played a lesbian partner in Nothing to Declare, an independent film by Julie Glass, and appeared in Chicago Story and the 2013 Superman, Man of Steel.

== Books and games ==
In 1984, she wrote her first book, The I Hate to Diet Dictionary, excerpts from which appeared in several magazines, including Cosmopolitan and was excerpted in "Like Mother, Like Daughter" from Hyperion Books.. Schaeffer and Balsamo have co-authored two books: Everything You Never Wanted to Know About Sex and The Book of Indecent Proposals.

In 1984, Schaeffer and Balsamo formed TDC Games, a board game company, and produced their first game, entitled "Adultrivia." They have since co-authored hundreds of games and puzzles which are sold worldwide, the most well-known of which is "Dirty Minds." Their games have won awards, have been played on radio and TV (by such personalities as Johnny Carson) and have been on the cover of magazines and newspapers such as The London Times June 20, 1992...front page and "The Washington Post" October 15, 1992 in "Home FronT" with the "Harassment Game." TDC Games, Inc. 1992.

In 2000, Schaeffer won first prize in the Blue Mountain Arts Poetry Contest for a poem dedicated to her late mother. As of 2011 Schaeffer continues to co-create some of the world's most popular board games and jigsaw puzzles.

In 2015, Schaeffer Bergeson's digital art was published in the Somerset magazine, "Digital Studio" as a spotlight on pages 84–86.
