= Claude E. Schaeffer =

American ethnologist (1901–1969

- Born: August 30, 1901; Germantown, Ohio, United States
- Died: October 11, 1969 (aged 68); Seaside, Oregon, United States
- Occupations: ethnologist, writer, museum director, curator

Academic background
- Education: University of Washington (BA, 1927); University of Pennsylvania (PhD,1940)
- Thesis: The subsistence quest of the Kutenai: A study of the interaction of culture and environment
- Influences: Clark Wissler

Academic work
- Discipline: anthropology
- Institutions: Oregon Historical Society
- Main interests: Indigenous peoples of the Plateau and Northern Plains

Claude Everett Schaeffer (August 30, 1901 – October 11, 1969) was an American ethnologist in the Northern Plains and Plateau area. He was best known for his research of the Blackfeet and Kutenai tribes.

== Early life and education ==
Schaeffer was born in Germantown, Ohio, on August 30, 1901. He moved to the West Coast and subsequently was employed under the Idaho Power Company until 1923, whereupon he became enrolled at the University of Washington, Seattle. After graduating with his Bachelor of Arts degree in 1927, he worked at his family owned firm until returning in 1931 for his graduate degree.

== Career ==
In 1932, Schaeffer transferred to Yale University, whereupon he came under the influence of Dr. Clark Wissler. He was subsequently selected as a summer field investigator to conduct work among the Flathead, Pend d'Oreilles and Kutenai tribes. Returning for two following summers, he would spend the majority of his professional career working in the area and among the indigenous peoples.

In 1935, Schaeffer was appointed as field consultant for the Department of the Interior, Bureau of Indian Affairs in Arlee, Montana. Among his many duties was to help establish the Wheeler-Howard Program of Native American self-government on the Flathead Indian Reservation.

In 1940, he received his PhD from the University of Pennsylvania. During the second world war, he served as a staff sergeant in the US Army. Schaeffer was then appointed director of the Museum of the Plain Indians in Browning, Montana, succeeding John C. Ewers. In 1954, he resigned due to poor health.

In 1956 he became curator of the Oregon Historical Society in Portland after recuperating.

In 1959 Schaeffer returned to his former position in Montana where he remained until 1966. During his career in Browning, he designed several notable exhibitions, began the Studies in Plains Anthropology and History series and published numerous academic papers. Schaeffer had the reputation of being a quiet and modest individual, and was regularly accepted into any reservation he visited.

== Death ==
Schaeffer died of a sudden heart attack at his home in Seaside, Oregon on October 11, 1969. At the time of his death, he had completed the first of a three-year contract for the Canadian National Historic Sites Branch to write a monograph on the ethnology of the Kutenai peoples.

== Selected bibliography ==
- Blackfoot Indians of Glacier National Park. 1958.
- Bear Ceremonialism of the Kutenai Indians. 1966.
- Blackfoot Shaking Tent. 1969.
