= Dirty Minds =

Board game made by TDC Games

Dirty Minds is a board game made by TDC Games, in which players try to guess the innocent answer to seemingly suggestive clues. It was popular in the 1990s and noughties, and was available at Spencer Gifts, as well as The Game Keeper stores. There are several games in the series, including Deluxe Dirty Minds.

Created in 1988 by Larry Balsamo and Sandra Schaeffer, it was originally sold only in novelty and adult stores. Over its history, however, it has permeated the mainstream marketplace. The primary reason for its popularity is its use of sexual double entendres as clues to otherwise innocuous riddles. All of the clues are puns that may sound dirty on a first hearing, but actually refer to clean solutions. For example, the correct answer for the clue "The more you play with me the harder I get" is "Rubik's Cube".

== Details ==
The game is completely clean unless the players have a dirty mind. All of the answers are clean. The player to correctly answer the question with the correct clean answer will be rewarded a card. Each card either displays a letter, lose a card, take two cards, or wild. The cards with the letters either have a D, I, R, T, or a Y. The first person to have all five of the lettered cards wins the game. The game is easy to play and meant to be funny. It is advised to be played with only adults 18 and up.

== Contents ==
The contents that come with the game include:

- Game Rules
- Puzzle Booklets
- 50 Game Cards
- 912 naughty clues
- 304 clean answers

== Versions ==
There are four versions to date: Dirty Minds (the original), More Dirty Minds, Deluxe Dirty Minds, which introduced an entirely new category and the travel card game edition, and Dirty Minds Supreme. As of 2011, a television game show version was in the works. Dirty Minds is also played regularly on radio stations across the country.
