= Serafia Fredrika Schaeffer =

Finnish healer and herbalist (1800–1887)

Serafia Fredrika Schaeffer (1800–1887), known as "Sheffer's Madam", was a Finnish cunning woman and herbalist. She was married to vicar Karl Johan Schaeffer and attended to the sick of the parish by use of her own herbal medicine. While this was not unusual for a vicar's wife, she continued with her medical care after she was widowed in 1833, and she did so with her own medicine and achieved widespread reputation as a cunning woman.
