= Frederick Christian Schaeffer =

American Lutheran clergyman (1792–1832)

Frederick Christian Schaeffer (12 November 1792, in Germantown, Pennsylvania – 26 March 1832, in New York City) was a Lutheran clergyman of the United States.

== Biography ==
His parents were Frederick David Schaeffer and Rosina Rosenmiller. His father was a Lutheran clergyman, as were his brothers David Frederick, Charles Frederick, and Frederick Solomon, and his nephew Charles William. He studied the classics partly at the Germantown academy and partly under his father, with whom he also read theology, and in 1812 was licensed to preach.

In the same year he became pastor of the Lutheran congregation at Harrisburg, Pennsylvania, where he remained three years. There he developed services in both English and German without controversy, an almost unique feat for a Lutheran congregation in his times. In 1815 he accepted a call to United Congregations of New York City, where he preached in German and English, a challenge which had driven the previous pastor to resign. He opposed the New York City tendency of English-speaking Lutherans to join with congregations of the Episcopal Church.

In 1823, he organized St. Matthew's English-speaking Lutheran congregation within the United Congregations. Frederick William Geissenhainer was retained to be co-pastor for the German-speaking congregations. Soon afterward difficulties about the church property arose between the German and English congregations. Schaeffer resigned, and organized St. James's English Lutheran congregation, which he served until his death.

He received the degree of D.D. in 1830 from Columbia, and in the same year he was elected professor of the German language and literature there. He was deeply interested in the study of natural science, and received from the king of Prussia a gold medal for his valuable services in the interest of this study. He published The Blessed Reformation and Parables and Parabolic Sayings (New York, 1817), and several sermons.

== See also ==
- St. Michael's Evangelical Lutheran Church (Mt. Airy)
