= Dietrich Schaeffer =

German politician (1933–2010)

Dietrich Schaeffer (Berlin, 5 December 1933 – 9 May 2010) was a German SPD politician and political rector.
