= Schaeffler (surname) =

Schaeffler is a German surname. Notable people with the surname include:

- Anton Schaeffler, inventor of the Schaeffler diagram
- Georg F. W. Schaeffler (born 1964), German businessman, owner of the Schaeffler Group
- Maria-Elisabeth Schaeffler (born 1941), German businesswoman
- Otto Schäffler, inventor of the Schaeffler code
- Willy Schaeffler (1915–1988), German skiing coach
