= Justus Christian Henry Helmuth =

German-American clergyman (1745–1825)

Justus Helmuth; portrait by John Eckstein

Justus Christian Henry Helmuth (16 May 1745 in Helmstedt, Brunswick, Germany – 5 February 1825 in Philadelphia, Pennsylvania, United States) was a German-American Lutheran clergyman.

== Biography ==
His father died when the son was a mere boy, but a nobleman, Gotthilf August Francke, sent him to the orphan house in Halle, and afterward to the University of Halle, where he received a thorough education in the classics and theology. He was ordained to the ministry at Wernigerode in 1769, and in the same year went to the United States in response to an urgent call from Lutheran congregations in Pennsylvania.

On his arrival in the U.S. in 1769, he was at once elected pastor of the congregation at Lancaster, Pennsylvania, for 10 years. In 1779 he moved to Philadelphia in answer to a unanimous call from St. Michael's, the first Lutheran congregation in the city. Here he spent the remainder of his life, serving as pastor until 1820. He was a member of the American Philosophical Society. The University of Pennsylvania conferred upon him the honorary degree of A.M. in 1780, and that of D.D. in 1785. In the same institution, he was professor of German and Oriental languages for 18 years, and was regarded as one of the best linguistic scholars of his time.

In 1785, with his colleague and intimate friend John Frederick Schmidt, he established a private seminary at Philadelphia, for the education of young men for the ministry, which continued for twenty years, until age and pressure of other labors prevented them from attending properly to the work. In this private institution, many of the early Lutheran pastors received their theological training. Helmuth was frequently elected to ecclesiastical offices of honor and trust, and was identified with many of the public institutions of Philadelphia. Though he was partial to the German language, and opposed the use of the English language in Lutheran church services, this did not prevent him from taking an interest in the various activities, educational and religious, of his adopted country.

== Literary efforts ==
His published works include Taufe und heilige Schrift (Baptism and holy scripture, 1793), Unterhaltungen mit Gott (Conversations with God), books for children, and a volume of German hymns. For several years he edited the Evangelical Magazine, a German periodical of Philadelphia which he had founded, and the first Lutheran Church newspaper in the United States.

== Family ==
He married Maria Barbara Keppele in 1770. They had five children.
