= Charles Frederick Schaeffer =

American theologian (1807–1879)

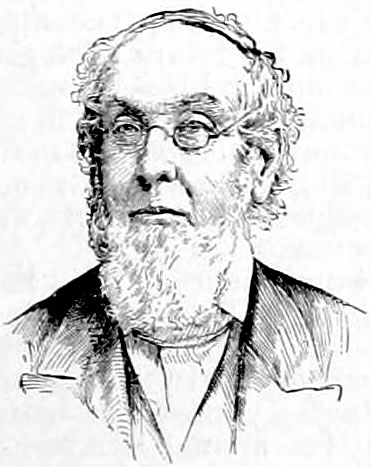

Charles Frederick Schaeffer (3 September 1807 in Germantown, Pennsylvania – 23 November 1879 in Philadelphia) was a Lutheran clergyman of the United States.

== Biography ==
His parents were Frederick David Schaeffer and Rosina Rosenmiller. His father was a Lutheran clergyman, as were his brothers David Frederick, Frederick Christian, and Frederick Solomon, and his nephew Charles William. He was educated in the University of Pennsylvania, and studied theology under the direction of his father and Charles Rudolph Demme.

He was ordained in 1829, and became pastor at Carlisle, Pennsylvania, where he remained until 1834. In the latter year he moved to Hagerstown, Maryland, where he had charge of several Lutheran congregations until 1839. He was professor of theology in Capitol University, Columbus, Ohio 1840-43. He was culturally ill-suited for this position, and, after difficulties with a colleague, students and other ministers and pastor, he responded to a demand that he resign. He was then pastor at Lancaster, Ohio 1843-45, at Red Hook, New York 1845-51, and at Easton, Pennsylvania 1851-55.

In 1855, he became professor of the German language and literature in the Lutheran Theological Seminary at Gettysburg, Pennsylvania. There his conservatism was a challenge to liberal colleagues like Samuel Simon Schmucker and middle-of-the-roaders like Charles Philip Krauth. The uneasy equilibrium ruptured in 1864, and Schaeffer left to become professor of systematic theology of a newly established theological seminary at Philadelphia, and its president.

As representative of the strictly conservative and confessional party in the Lutheran Church, Schaeffer defended his position with great force in many publications, and was a leader in the organization of the general council in 1867.

== Works ==
He published a large number of historical, homiletical, and doctrinal articles, and left several manuscripts of value, including a complete System of Lutheran Theology. Among his works are:

- J. F. Kurtz, Manual of Sacred History, translated from the German (Philadelphia, 1855)
- Martin Luther, Small Catechism, a revised translation (1856)
- Inaugural Address at Gettysburg (New York, 1856)
- Johann Arndt, True Christianity, translated from the German (1868)

== Family ==
He married Susanna Schmucker in 1832, daughter of John George Schmucker. They had five children.
