= Charles William Schaeffer =

American theologian (1813–1896)

Charles William Schaeffer (born in Hagerstown, Maryland, May 5, 1813; died in Philadelphia, Pennsylvania, March 15, 1896) was a Lutheran clergyman and theologian of the United States.

== Biography ==
His parents were Frederick Solomon Schaeffer (1790–1815) and Catherine Elizabeth Schaeffer. His father was a Lutheran clergyman, as were his uncles David Frederick Schaeffer, Frederick Christian Schaeffer and Charles Frederick Schaeffer, and his grandfather Frederick David Schaeffer. He grew up in the home of his grandfather and that of stepfather Benjamin Keller. He attended Germantown Academy, and graduated from the University of Pennsylvania in 1832, and at the Lutheran Theological Seminary at Gettysburg, Pennsylvania, in 1835, licensed to preach in 1835, and ordained in 1836.

Immediately after being ordained, he took charge of a parish in Montgomery County, which he served until 1841. He was pastor at Harrisburg, in 1841–49, and at Germantown, in 1849–75, when he was retired as pastor emeritus. In 1864, when the theological seminary was established in Philadelphia, he was elected professor of ecclesiastical history, which post he had since held.

He held high office in the councils of his church, and had been one of the trustees of the University of Pennsylvania since 1859, receiving from it the degree of DD in 1879. That of LL.D. was given him in 1887 by Thiel College, Greenville. Schaeffer was long one of the leaders of the conservative and confessional party in the Lutheran Church. He took an active part in the establishment of the theological seminary at Philadelphia in 1864, and in the organization of the general council in 1867. He was specially versed in American Lutheran history and the historical and doctrinal development of the Lutheran Church in the United States.

The C. W. Schaeffer Combined Secondary and Primary School was a Philadelphia public school in Germantown built in 1876 and named in his honor.

== Writings ==
He wrote numerous articles for church papers and theological reviews. He was for several years co-editor of the Lutheran Home Journal in Philadelphia, and the Philadelphian, Lutheran and Missionary. After 1879 he was editor-in-chief of The Foreign Missionary in Philadelphia, and after 1886 he was one of the editors of the Lutheran Church Review. He published:

- W. J. Mann, Explanation of Luther's Small Catechism, translated from the German (Philadelphia, 1855)
- Early History of the Lutheran Church in America (1857)
- Golden Treasury for the Children of God, translated from the German (1860)
- Family Prayer, for Morning and Evening, and the Festivals of the Church Year
- Halle Reports, translated from the German (Reading, 1882)
- Church Book (1891)

== Family ==
He married Elizabeth Ashmead in 1837. They had four children.
