= List of people from Ithaca, New York =

This is a list of people who either were born in Ithaca, New York or who lived there other than when attending Cornell University or Ithaca College. Tompkins County, where Ithaca is located, ranked eighth among the 3,144 U.S. counties for the highest density of culturally notable baby boomers, according to a 2014 analysis by The New York Times.

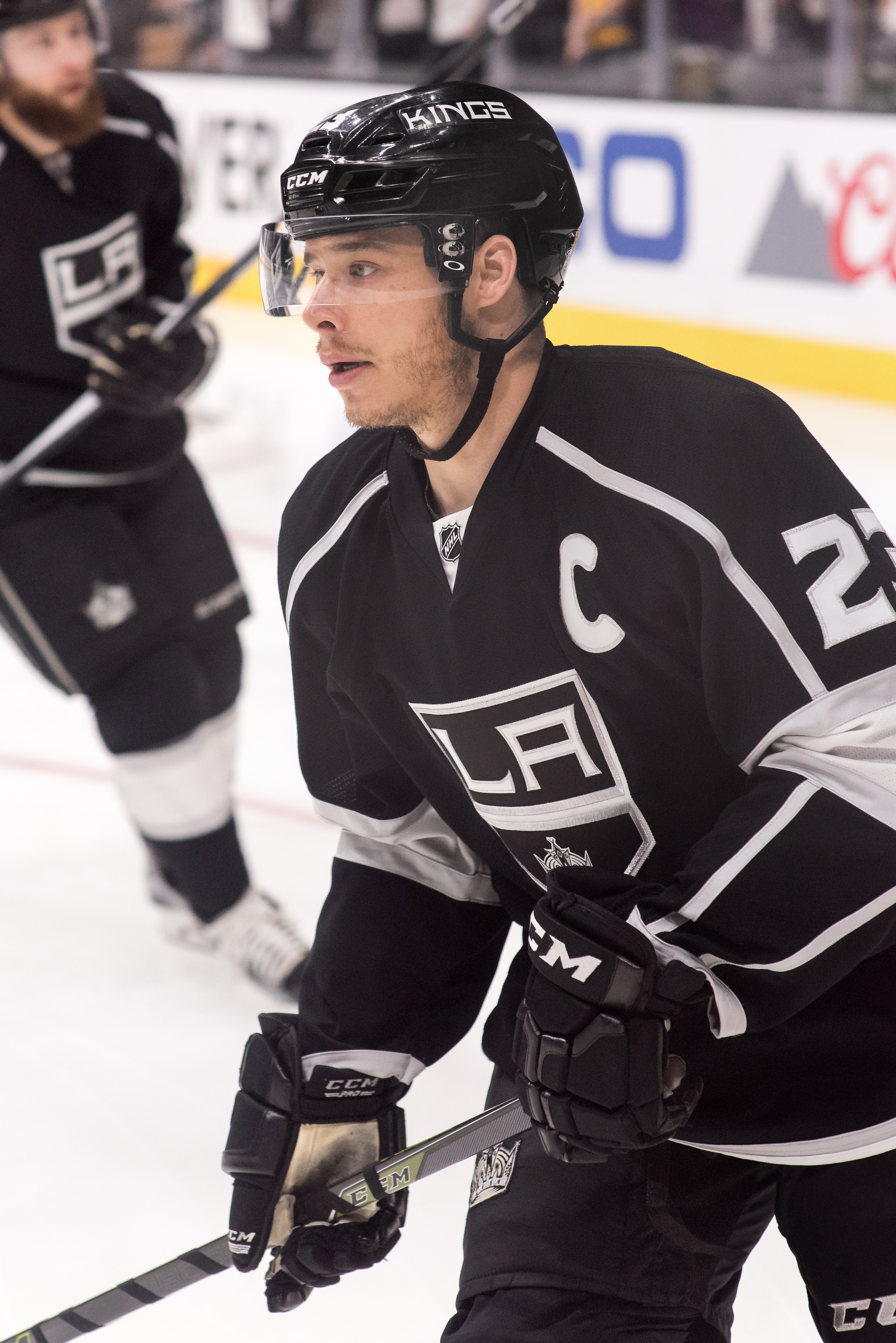
Dustin Brown

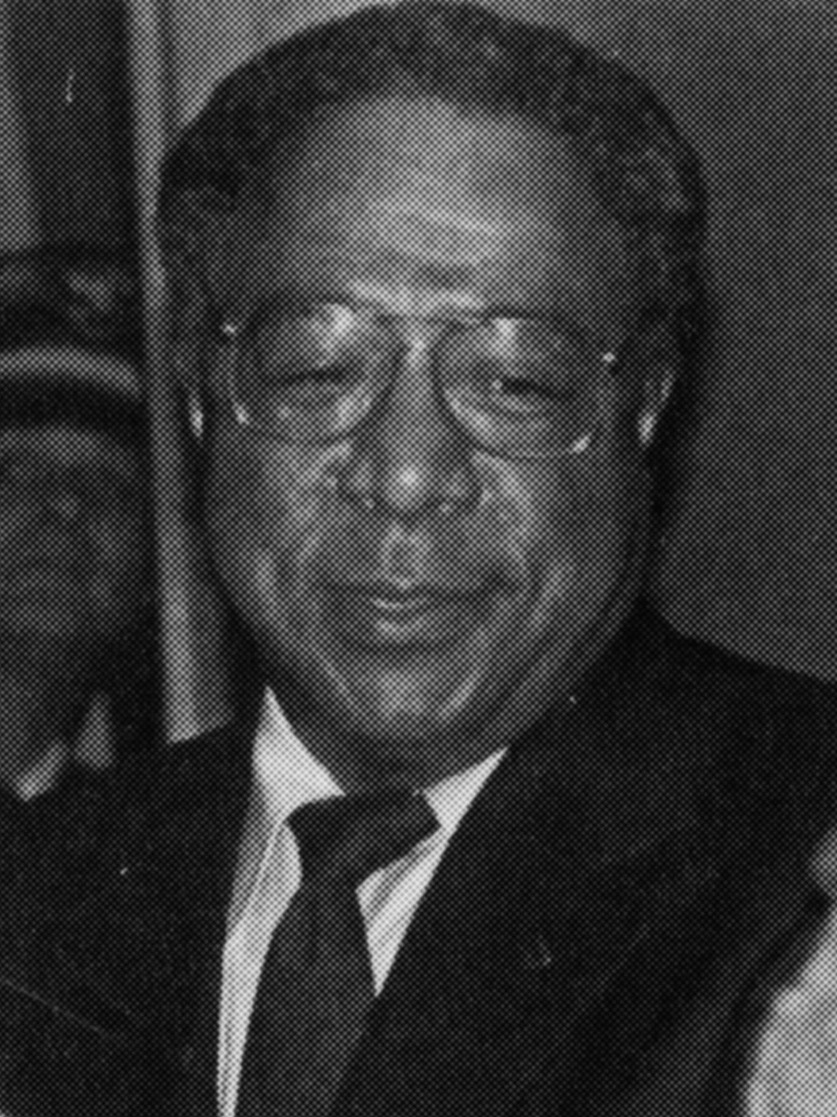
Alex Haley

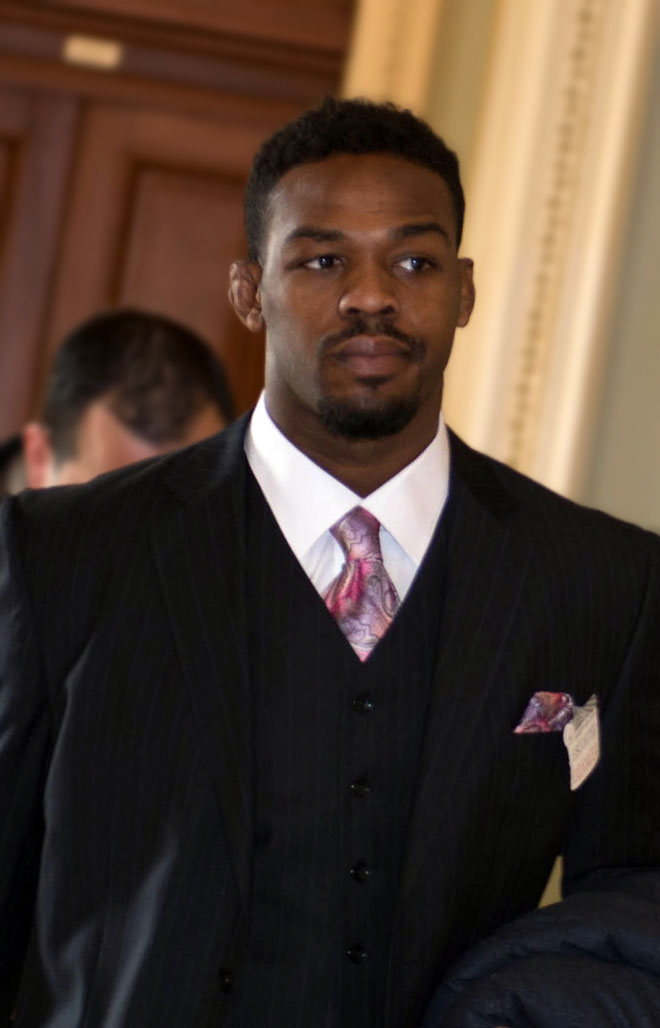
Jon Jones

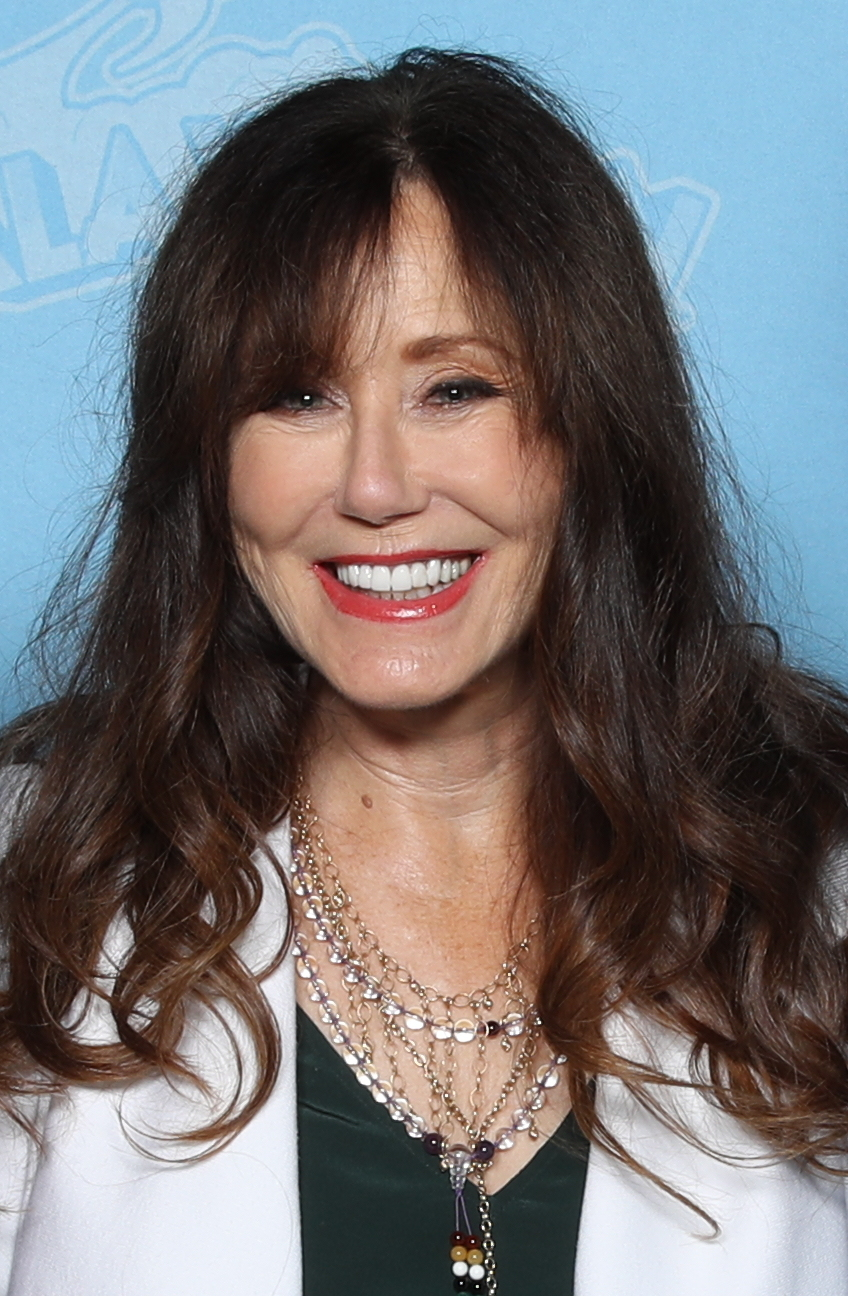
Mary McDonnell

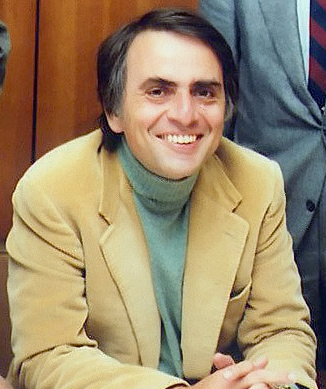
Carl Sagan

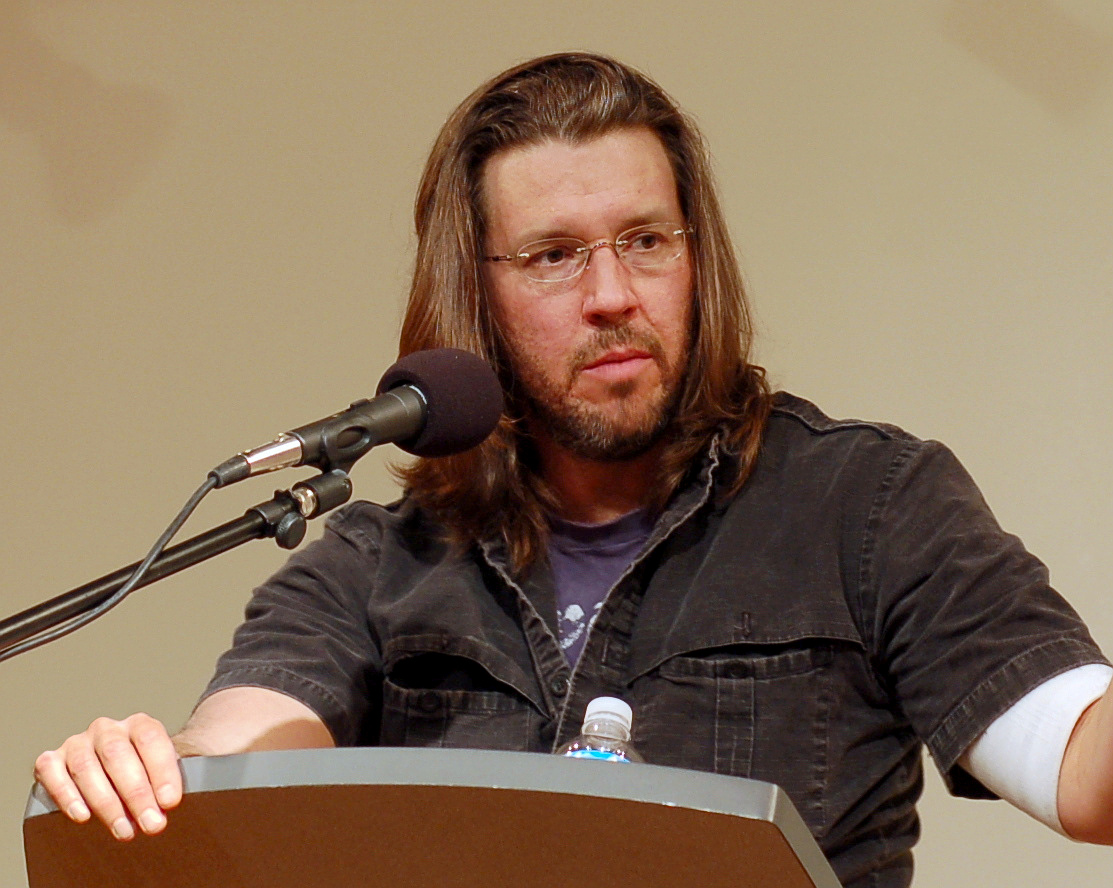
David Foster Wallace

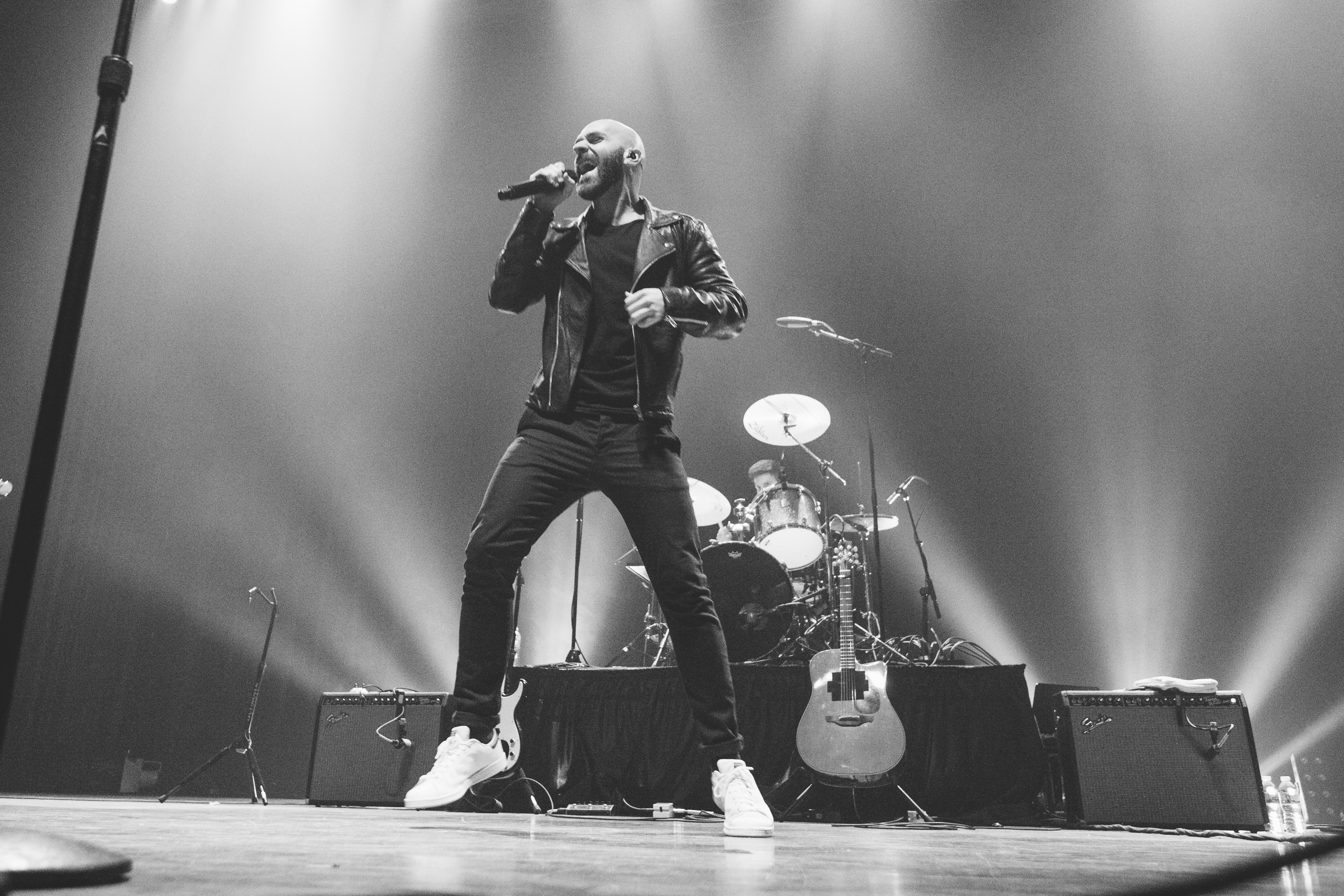
X Ambassadors

- Lavilla Esther Allen – native, author, and poet
- David Altshuler – native, endocrinologist, and geneticist
- A.R. Ammons – resident, poet, professor at Cornell University, and National Book Award winner
- Benedict Anderson – resident, political scientist, historian, and author known for his 1983 book Imagined Communities, which explored the origins of nationalism
- Liberty Hyde Bailey – resident, horticulturist, professor at Cornell University, and co-founder of the American Society for Horticultural Science
- Iris Barbura – resident, dancer, and choreographer
- Josh Bard – native, former professional baseball player, and coach for the Los Angeles Dodgers
- Hans Bethe – resident, physicist known for his work with the Manhattan Project, professor at Cornell University, and Nobel Prize winner
- Henry Bool – anarchist, publisher, and businessman
- Vincent Borden – native and soccer player
- Urie Bronfenbrenner – resident, psychologist, professor at Cornell University, and co-founder of Head Start
- Dustin Brown – native, former professional ice hockey player, and Stanley Cup champion for the Los Angeles Kings
- Lucy J. Brown – native, activist, and public official
- Annie Burns – resident, musician, and founding member of The Burns Sisters
- Marie Burns – resident, musician, and founding member of The Burns Sisters
- John H. Camp – native, lawyer, and former U.S. congressman
- Stephen L. Carter – native, professor of law at Yale University, and best-selling novelist known for The Emperor of Ocean Park
- Philip N. Cohen – native, sociologist, and professor at the University of Maryland
- Alex Compton – resident, former professional basketball player, and coach for the Philippine Basketball Association
- Anna Coogan – resident and singer-songwriter
- Alonzo Cornell – native, businessman, and politician who was the 27th governor of New York from 1880 to 1882; son of Ezra Cornell
- Ezra Cornell – resident, businessman, politician, and philanthropist; co-founder of Western Union and Cornell University
- Kyle Dake – native, four-time World Champion freestyle wrestler, and bronze medalist at the 2020 and 2024 Summer Olympics
- Amasa Dana – resident, lawyer, and politician who served two non-consecutive terms as a U.S. congressman from New York from 1839 to 1841 and from 1843 to 1845
- Buck Dharma – resident, musician, and founding member of Blue Öyster Cult
- Asia Kate Dillon – native and actor known for Orange Is the New Black and Billions
- Johnny Dowd – resident and alternative country musician
- Robert Earle – resident, broadcaster, and host of G.E. College Bowl from 1962 to 1970
- Julius Eastman – native, composer, pianist, and vocalist
- Adam C. Engst – native, technology writer, and publisher of TidBITS, the oldest Internet-based email newsletter
- Noah Feldshuh – native, musician, and founding member of X Ambassadors
- Richard Feynman – resident, physicist known for his work with the Manhattan Project, professor at Cornell University, and Nobel Prize winner
- Carl Frederick – resident, science fiction author, and theoretical physicist
- Louis Agassiz Fuertes – native, ornithologist, illustrator, and artist who is considered one of the most prolific American bird artists
- Alice Fulton – resident, author, and professor at Cornell University
- Juan Pablo Galavis – native, former professional soccer player, and star of The Bachelor
- John H. Gear – native, politician who was the 11th governor of Iowa from and 1878 to 1882, and a U.S. senator from 1895 to 1900
- George Gorse – native, art historian, educator, and professor at Pomona College
- Greg Graffin – resident, musician, and founding member of Bad Religion
- Walter S. Grant – native and U.S. Army major general
- Alex Haley – native, author known for his 1965 book The Autobiography of Malcolm X, and his 1976 novel Roots: The Saga of an American Family, which ABC adapted into a TV miniseries of the same name in 1977
- Brian Hall – resident, writer, and author
- Michael S. Hall – adjutant general of New York
- Jane Louisa Hardy – resident, activist, and philanthropist
- Casey Harris – native, musician, and founding member of X Ambassadors
- Sam Harris – native, musician, and founding member of X Ambassadors
- Richard W. Hubbell – native, lawyer, and Wisconsin politician
- Karel Husa – resident, classical composer, conductor, professor at Cornell University, and Pulitzer Prize winner
- Ricky Jay – resident, magician, actor, and writer
- Jon Jones – resident, mixed martial artist, UFC Heavyweight Champion, and former two-time UFC Light Heavyweight Champion
- David Lee – resident, physicist, professor at Cornell University, and Nobel Prize winner
- David Lehman – resident, poet, non-fiction writer, and literary critic
- J. Robert Lennon – resident and author known for his novels Mailman and Happyland
- James L. Linderman – native, politician, and former Wisconsin State Assemblyman
- Richard V. E. Lovelace – resident, astrophysicist, plasma physicist, and professor at Cornell University
- Norman Malcolm – resident, philosopher, and professor at Cornell University
- Mary McDonnell – native, actress known for her roles in Dances with Wolves, Passion Fish, Independence Day, Donnie Darko, and Battlestar Galactica
- Matthew F. McHugh – resident, lawyer, and politician who was a Democratic member of the United States House of Representatives from 1975 to 1993
- Howard B. Meek – resident, professor, and founder of the Cornell University School of Hotel Administration
- Bernie Milton – native and musician
- Robert Moog – resident, engineer, and electronic music pioneer; founder of the synthesizer manufacturer Moog Music and the inventor of the first commercial synthesizer, the Moog synthesizer, which debuted in 1964
- Tim Moresco – native and professional football player for the New York Jets
- Vladimir Nabokov – resident, novelist, poet, professor at Cornell University, and author known for his 1955 novel Lolita, which ranked fourth on Modern Library's list of the 100 best novels
- Nicholas Nicastro – resident, writer, filmmaker, and film critic
- Yen Ospina – resident and muralist
- Lonnie Park – native, musician, and three-time Grammy Award-winner
- Roy H. Park – resident, entrepreneur, and media mogul; founder of Park Communications and the Park Foundation
- Harry Partch – resident, composer, music theorist, and creator of unique musical instruments
- Bre Pettis – native, entrepreneur, video blogger, and creative artist; co-founder and CEO of MakerBot Industries
- Steve Poleskie – resident, artist, and professor at Cornell University whose work is featured in numerous museums, including the Metropolitan Museum, the Museum of Modern Art, and the Whitney Museum
- Thomas Pynchon – resident and author known for his 1973 novel Gravity's Rainbow, which won the National Book Award
- Robert C. Richardson – resident, physicist, professor at Cornell University, and Nobel Prize winner
- Kurt Riley – resident, songwriter, and musician
- Hank Roberts – resident, jazz cellist, and vocalist
- Flora Rose – resident, scientist, nutritionist, and professor at Cornell University who was co-director of what would become the New York State College of Human Ecology
- Frank Rosenblatt – resident, psychologist, computer scientist, and professor at Cornell University known in the field of artificial intelligence
- Carl Sagan – resident, astronomer, popularizer of science, Pulitzer Prize-winning author of The Dragons of Eden, and presenter of the Emmy Award-winning TV series Cosmos
- Nick Sagan – native, novelist, screenwriter, and professor at Ithaca College; son of Carl Sagan
- Sasha Sagan – native, author, TV producer, filmmaker, and podcaster; daughter of Carl Sagan
- Tim Sale – native and Eisner Award-winning comics artist known for his work on the DC Comics characters
- Eugene Schuyler – native, scholar, writer, explorer, and diplomat; son of George Schuyler
- George Schuyler – resident, businessman, author, politician, and member of the prominent Schuyler family who was New York State Treasurer from 1864 to 1865
- Walter Schuyler – native and officer in the United States Army who attained the rank of brigadier general; son of George Schuyler
- Father Robert Smith – resident, Catholic priest, author, and educator who was director of the Cornell Catholic Community
- Louisa Rachel Solomon – native, musician, and lead singer of The Shondes
- Steve Squyres – resident, astronomer, professor at Cornell University, and principal investigator of the Mars Exploration Rover Mission
- Cynthia Morgan St. John – native, Wordsworthian, book collector, and author
- Steven Strogatz – resident, mathematician, and professor at Cornell University
- Steven Stucky – resident, classical composer, professor at Cornell University, and Pulitzer Prize winner
- William H. Thomas – resident, geriatrician, author, and Heinz Award winner for the Human Condition
- Henry S. Walbridge – resident, lawyer, and politician who was a U.S. congressman from 1851 to 1853
- David Foster Wallace – native and author known for his 1996 novel Infinite Jest, which Time cited as one of the 100 best novels
- Alfred Wells – resident, lawyer, and politician; co-owner of the Ithaca Journal and Advertiser, district attorney of Tompkins County from 1845 to 1847, and U.S. congressman from 1859 to 1861
- E.B. White – resident and author known for several popular books for children, including Charlotte's Web; writer and contributing editor to The New Yorker and a co-author of The Elements of Style
- Robert R. Wilson – resident, physicist known for his work with the Manhattan Project, and professor at Cornell University; architect of the Fermi National Accelerator Laboratory
- Ludwig Wittgenstein – resident and philosopher who is considered by some to be the greatest philosopher of the 20th century
- Paul Wolfowitz – native, political scientist, and diplomat; served as U.S. ambassador to Indonesia, U.S. deputy secretary of defense, and the 10th president of the World Bank
- Christopher Woodrow – native and Hollywood movie producer known for Birdman, Black Mass, and Hacksaw Ridge
- Alexi Zentner – resident and author known for his novel Copperhead, which is set in a fictional town that resembles Ithaca
