= General Schuyler (disambiguation) =

Philip Schuyler (1733–1804) was a Continental Army major general. General Schuyler may also refer to:

- Cortlandt V. R. Schuyler (1900–1993), U.S. Army four-star general
- Walter S. Schuyler (1849–1932), U.S. Army brigadier general
