= William B. Lewis (New York treasurer) =

American politician and businessman (c. 1816-1884)

William B. Lewis (c. 1816 – October 15, 1884) was an American businessman and politician.

== Life ==
He began to work as a brick hod carrier, then learned the builder's trade, and became a contractor.

In the 1850s, he was City Comptroller of Brooklyn.

He was New York State Treasurer from 1862 to 1863, elected on the Union ticket nominated by the Republicans and War Democrats.

After the American Civil War he left politics, and became the Secretary and Cashier of the Brooklyn City Railroad and held these posts until his sudden death, collapsing on Fulton Street, Brooklyn. Sometime prior to his death he had removed to Plainfield, New Jersey, but commuted to Brooklyn every day.

== Sources ==
- Obit in NYT, on October 16, 1884 (stating he was City Comptroller as a Democrat)
- Nominations on the American Party ticket for Brooklyn city election, in NYT on March 18, 1859 (stating he had been nominated by the Republican Party, and was endorsed by the American Party)
- Comptroller's annual report, in NYT on March 14, 1859
- Brooklyn city loan announced, in NYT on March 31, 1855
- Political Graveyard
- New York Union state ticket, in Harper's Weekly, September 28, 1861, pg. 611

Political offices
Preceded by Philip Dorsheimer	New York State Treasurer; 1862–1863	Succeeded by George W. Schuyler
