= Eugene Schuyler =

American scholar, writer, explorer and diplomat (1840–1890)

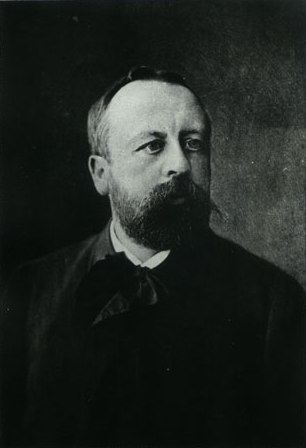

U.S. Consul General to Egypt
- In office November 23, 1889 – July 2, 1890
- President: Benjamin Harrison
- Preceded by: John Cardwell
- Succeeded by: John Alexander Anderson

U.S. Minister to Greece
- In office January 9, 1883 – October 13, 1884
- President: Chester A. Arthur
- Preceded by: John M. Read, Jr.
- Succeeded by: A. Loudon Snowden

U.S. Minister to Serbia
- In office November 10, 1882 – September 19, 1884
- President: Chester A. Arthur
- Preceded by: Inaugural holder
- Succeeded by: Walker Fearn

U.S. Consul General to Romania
- In office December 14, 1880 – September 7, 1884
- President: Rutherford B. Hayes; James A. Garfield; Chester A. Arthur
- Preceded by: Inaugural holder
- Succeeded by: Walker Fearn

Personal details
- Born: February 26, 1840 Ithaca, New York, United States
- Died: July 16, 1890 (aged 50) Venice, Kingdom of Italy
- Resting place: Cimitero di San Michele; Venice, Italy
- Spouse: Gertrude Wallace King (m. 1877)
- Parent(s): George Washington Schuyler; Matilda Scribner
- Education: Yale College; Yale Law School; Columbia Law School
- Occupation: Diplomat; writer; translator

Eugene Schuyler (February 26, 1840 – July 16, 1890) was a nineteenth-century American scholar, writer, explorer and diplomat. Schuyler was one of the first three Americans to earn a Ph.D. from an American university; and the first American translator of Ivan Turgenev and Leo Tolstoy. He was the first American diplomat to visit Russian Central Asia, and as American Consul General in Istanbul he played a key role in publicizing Turkish atrocities in Bulgaria in 1876 during the April Uprising. He was the first American Minister to Romania and Serbia, and U.S. Minister to Greece.

== Early life ==
Schuyler was born in Ithaca, New York, on February 26, 1840. He was the son of Matilda (née Scribner) Schuyler and George W. Schuyler, a drugstore owner in Ithaca, New York, who later was elected New York State Treasurer and served as a member of the New York State Assembly. Schuyler's siblings included Walter S. Schuyler, a U.S. Army brigadier general. His sister Martha was the mother of Major General Walter S. Grant.

His father's ancestors, of Dutch descent, included Philip Schuyler, a general in George Washington's army and a U.S. Senator. His mother was the half-sister of Charles Scribner, the founder of the famous American publishing house.

At the age of fifteen, Schuyler entered Yale College, where he studied languages, literature and philosophy. He graduated with honors in 1859 and was a member of Skull and Bones. In 1861, Schuyler earned a PhD in psychology and philosophy at Yale, and in doing, along with Arthur Williams Wright and James Morris Whiton, became the first Americans to earn the PhD degree from an American university. The topic of his dissertation is up for debate, though one theory is that it was titled "Wedgwood on English Philology," later published in Bibliotheca Sacra in 1862.

In 1860, Schuyler became an assistant to Noah Porter, a prominent linguistician and literary figure, in the revision of Webster's Dictionary, the first dictionary of American English. In 1862, Schuyler began to study law at Yale Law School, and received his law degree, in 1863, from Columbia Law School. He began practicing law in New York, but did not find it very interesting. Instead he began to write, becoming a contributor to The Nation magazine. He continued to write for The Nation until the end of his life.

== Career ==
In September 1863 a Russian naval squadron made a long stay in New York harbor, hoping to escape capture by the British Navy in the event of a war between Britain and Russia over the Polish Uprising of 1863. Schuyler met some of the officers of the Russian flagship, the Alexander Nevsky, which inspired him to study Russian. He learned Russian well enough to translate the novel of Ivan Turgenev, Fathers and Sons, which was published in 1867, the first translation of Turgenev to appear in the United States. The same year Schuyler studied Finnish, and completed the first American translation of the Finnish national epic, Kalevala. The translation had been begun by John Addison Porter, a professor at Yale who died in 1866.

=== Diplomat to Russia ===
In 1864, Schuyler applied for a diplomatic post in the State Department. The State Department took three years to consider his application, and then offered him the position of consul in Moscow, then the second city of Russia. En route to his post, Schuyler stopped in Baden-Baden to meet Turgenev, who gave him a letter of introduction to Lev Tolstoi. Schuyler began his diplomatic tour in Moscow in August 1867.

In the spring of 1868 he made his first trip to the edge of Central Asia, traveling with a Russian merchant, Vasilii Alekseich, by steamboat down the Volga to Samara, then by carriage to Orenburg, which at the time was the base for Russian military operations The Russians had occupied the Khanate of Bukhara in 1866 and were advancing toward Samarkand. In 1868, Schuyler was a guest of Tolstoi for a week at his estate at Yasnaya Polyana, at the time when Tolstoi was finishing War and Peace. He helped Tolstoi rearrange his library, and went hunting with him. Tolstoi, who was interested in public education in the United States, asked Schuyler for copies of American primers and school textbooks. Schuyler received Tolstoi's permission to translate his novel The Cossacks into English. In 1869, the new Administration of President Ulysses Grant removed Schuyler from his post in Moscow and replaced him with a political appointee. Schuyler was able to obtain a post as consul to the Russian port of Reval (now Tallinn). In November, 1869, President Grant appointed a new Minister to Russia, Andrew Curtin, a former Governor of Pennsylvania who knew nothing of Russia. Curtin was impressed by Schuyler and appointed him as the secretary of the American legation in St. Petersburg, a post which Schuyler held until 1876.

=== Travels in Central Asia ===
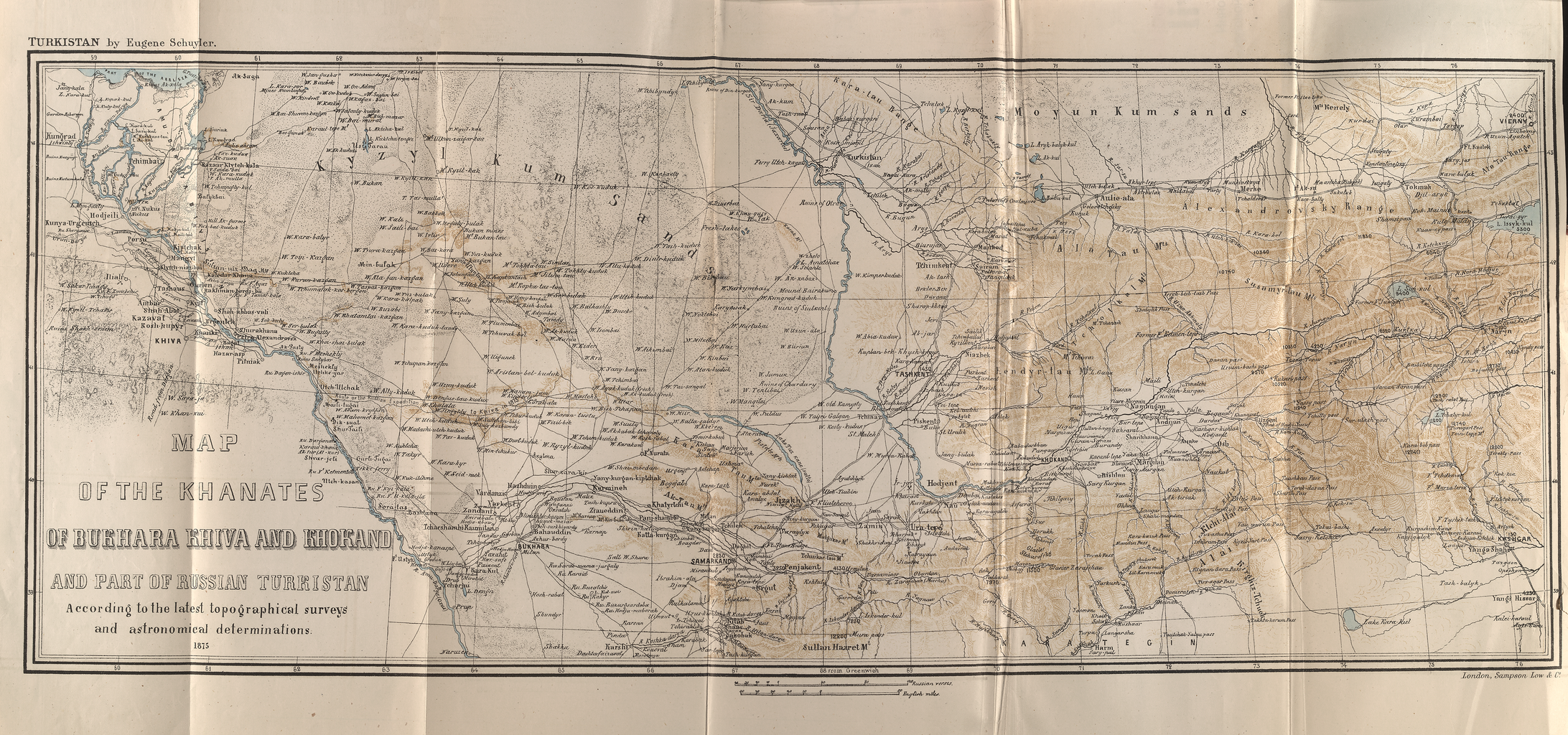
"Map of the Khanates of Bukhara, Khiva, and Khokand and Part of Russian Turkistan" by Eugene Schuyler, 1875.

Schuyler was able to combine his diplomatic duties with scholarship and travel. He began writing a major biography of Peter the Great, and frequented the meetings of the Russian Geographic Society in St. Petersburg. In 1873, he was one of the first foreigners invited to visit Russia's new conquests in Central Asia.

Schuyler left St. Petersburg by train on March 23, 1873, and traveled first to Saratov. He was accompanied by an American journalist, Januarius MacGahan, who was working for the New York Herald. Schuyler and MacGahan traveled from Saratov by sledge to Orenburg, then to Kazala (now Kazalinsk), then to Fort Perovskii (now Kzyl-Orda). MacGahan went from there to find the Russian Army at Khiva, while Schuyler travelled through Turkistan and Shymkent on to Tashkent, in present-day Uzbekistan, Samarkand, Bukhara and Kokand. He returned to St. Petersburg via Siberia and the Urals. His trip had taken eight months (he had told the State Department he would be gone only three months), but he brought back a wealth of geographical information.

Schuyler wrote extensively about his trip for the National Geographic Society in the United States, and he also wrote a long report for the State Department. He was embarrassed when his confidential report was published in December 1876 in Papers Relating to the Foreign Relations of the United States – 1874, and translated into Russian by the St. Petersburg press. His report had been critical of the treatment of the Tatars by the Russian General Konstantin Petrovich Von Kaufman.

With the exception of the treatment of the Tatars, Schuyler was favorable toward the Russian presence in Central Asia. "On the whole, the Russian influence is beneficial in Central Asia," he wrote, "not only for the inhabitants, but to the world, and it certainly is greatly to our interest that a counterpoise should exist there against the extension of English domination in Asia. Having once taken possession of the country, it will be almost impossible for the Russians, with any fairness to the natives, to withdraw from it."

Schuyler wrote a two-volume book about his travels in Central Asia. The book, Turkestan, was published in October 1876, in both the United States and England. Like his report to the State Department, it was favorable to Russia's role in Central Asia: "Notwithstanding the many faults which may be found in the administration of the country, the Russian rule is on the whole beneficial to the natives, and it would be manifestly injust to them to withdraw her protection and leave them to anarchy and to the unbridled rule of fanatical despots."

=== Investigation of Turkish Atrocities in Bulgaria ===
Schuyler left Russia in 1876. He tried unsuccessfully to be named Minister to Turkey, but that position went to a political appointee of the Grant administration and he was given the position once more of the secretary of the legation, and also of consul general.

He arrived in Istanbul on July 6, 1876, two months after an uprising against Turkish rule had taken place in Bulgaria. The uprising had been repressed by force by the Ottoman Army, with the massacre of civilians. Schuyler learned of these massacres from the Bulgarian students and faculty of Robert College in Constantinople.

Vague reports of the massacres had first been printed in the British press on May 6. American Faculty members from Robert College collected more information and sent them to the British Minister to Turkey, with no result. They then sent the reports to the correspondents of The Times and the London Daily News. The London Daily News published its account on June 23, 1876. It caused an immediate sensation in London. The Bulgarian atrocities were discussed in Parliament on June 26, and the opposition Liberal Party demanded a full investigation. The Conservative government of Prime Minister Benjamin Disraeli agreed to investigate the reports.

The British Government appointed a second secretary at their embassy in Istanbul, Walter Baring, to conduct the investigation. Fearing a cover-up, the faculty members of Robert College asked the American Minister to Turkey, Horace Maynard, to conduct his own investigation. Maynard gave the task to Schuyler.

Schuyler prepared to travel to Bulgaria to investigate the reports. By chance, Schuyler's friend from Russia, Januarius MacGahan, arrived in Constantinople to cover the Serbia-Turkish War. Schuyler invited MacGahan to accompany him on his journey to Bulgaria. Schuyler and MacGahan left for Bulgaria on July 23. They were joined by a correspondent of Kölnische Zeitung German journalist Karl Schneider (1854–1945) and by a second secretary of the Russian Embassy in Constantinople Georgian prince Aleksi Tsereteli (Aleksei Tseretelev) and Turkish and Bulgarian translator Petar Dimitrov, instructor at the American Robert College in Constantinople. They spent three weeks documenting the atrocities which had taken place at villages in southern Bulgaria three months earlier. After visiting a number of towns and villages, Schuyler stated in his report to the U.S. Minister to Turkey, Horace Maynard: " It is very difficult to estimate the number of Bulgarians who were killed during the few days that the disturbances lasted, but I am inclined to put 15,000 for the districts that I have named."

Schuyler gave a vivid account of what he saw at the village of Batak, three months after the massacres had taken place:

... On every side were human bones, skulls, ribs, and even complete skeletons, heads of girls still adorned with braids of long hair, bones of children, skeletons still encased in clothing. Here was a house the floor of which was white with the ashes and charred bones of thirty persons burned alive there. Here was the spot where the village notable Trandafil was spitted on a pike and then roasted, and where he is now buried; there was a foul hole full of decomposing bodies; here a mill dam filled with swollen corpses; here the school house, where 200 women and children had taken refuge there were burned alive, and here the church and churchyard, where fully a thousand half-decayed forms were still to be seen, filling the enclosure in a heap several feet high, arms, feet, and heads protruding from the stones which had vainly been thrown there to hide them, and poisoning all the air.

Since my visit, by orders of the Mutessarif, the Kaimakam of Tatar Bazardjik was sent to Batak, with some lime to aid in the decomposition of the bodies, and to prevent a pestilence.

Ahmed Aga, who commanded at the massacre, has been decorated and promoted to the rank of Yuz-bashi ...

Schuyler's official report, and MacGahan's newspaper reporting, combined to cause a sensation in the British press. The Government of Benjamin Disraeli tried to minimize the massacres, saying that the Bulgarians were equally responsible, but these claims were refuted by Schuyler and MacGahan's eyewitness reports. When Russia threatened war against Turkey, Britain told the Turkish government that, because of the state of public opinion, it could not take the side of Turkey.

The Russian Government, moved by Pan-Slavic sentiment and a desire to help the Orthodox Christian Bulgarians, declared war on the Ottoman Empire and invaded Bulgaria in 1877. The Turkish Army was defeated and Bulgaria was liberated from Ottoman rule in 1878.

Schuyler's role in the liberation of Bulgaria greatly displeased the Ottoman Government, which protested to the U.S. Government. Secretary of State Hamilton Fish was also displeased with Schuyler, since Schuyler had acted without his knowledge or consent. He discussed withdrawing Schuyler from Turkey, but decided against it, since he did not want to appear to be unsympathetic to the Bulgarians. When a new president, Rutherford Hayes, took office, Schuyler was subjected to more attacks in the press, accused of bias toward the Bulgarians. On January 3, 1878, the Turkish Government demanded his recall: "The Porte regarded a continuance of Mr. Schuyler as consul-general at Constantinople as a serious injury to Turkey in its diplomatic relations and in the administration of its affairs in the provinces." On May 29, 1878, a State Department investigation of Schuyler found that "His sentiments and sympathies are strongly anti-Turkish" and that he "aided greatly to alienate British sympathy from Turkey in her struggle with Russia," and reprimanded him for his "unauthorized and self-imposed mission to Bulgaria."

Schuyler was removed from Turkey and given the post of consul in Birmingham, England. While there he finished his translation of Tolstoi's The Cossacks, which was published in 1878.

=== Later diplomatic career ===
In August 1879, Schuyler became consul general in Rome, where he completed writing his book on Peter the Great, and began a new book on Catherine the Great.

A year later, he became Chargé d'affaires in Bucharest, as the United States prepared to recognize the independence of Romania and Serbia. In Romania, he studied Romanian and became a corresponding member of the Romanian Academy of Sciences. On July 7, 1882, he was concurrently appointed the Minister Resident/Counsul General to Romania, Serbia, and Greece, while becoming a resident in Athens. He presented his credentials to Romania on September 8, 1882, to Serbia on November 10, 1882, and to Greece on January 9, 1883. In July 1884, he was out of a job again when the U.S. Congress, as an economy measure, abolished the post of minister to Greece, Romania and Serbia. He presented his recall on September 7, 1884, for Romania, his recall was transmitted by note by the Vice Consul General at Belgrade on September 19, 1884, for Serbia, and he presented his recall on October 13, 1884, for Greece.

In 1884, Schuyler left the diplomatic service to lecture at Johns Hopkins and Cornell University on diplomatic practice and the conduct of American diplomacy. His book American Diplomacy and the Furtherance of Commerce was published by Scribner's in 1886, and according to his death notice in The New York Times, the publication of the book "prevented him from becoming a member of the permanent staff of the State Department, where his experience would have made him especially useful." In 1889, the Administration of President Benjamin Harrison nominated him as First Assistant Secretary of State. The nomination was withdrawn, however, after opposition within the Senate Foreign Relations Committee, and William F. Wharton was eventually appointed and confirmed.

Instead, Schuyler took the post of diplomatic agent and consul general in Cairo, Egypt. While in Egypt, he contracted malaria, and died in Venice on July 16, 1890, at the age of fifty. He was buried in the Protestant section of the San Michele cemetery on the island of Isola di San Michele in Venice.

== Personal life ==
On July 12, 1877, Schuyler was married to Gertrude Wallace "Gert" King (b. 1836) in Paris. She was the daughter of the late President of Columbia University Charles King, niece of former U.S. Representative and New York Governor John Alsop King, and granddaughter of both Rufus King and Nicholas Low. Her sister, Mary Alsop King Waddington, was a writer who was married to the Prime Minister of France William Henry Waddington.

=== Legacy and honors ===
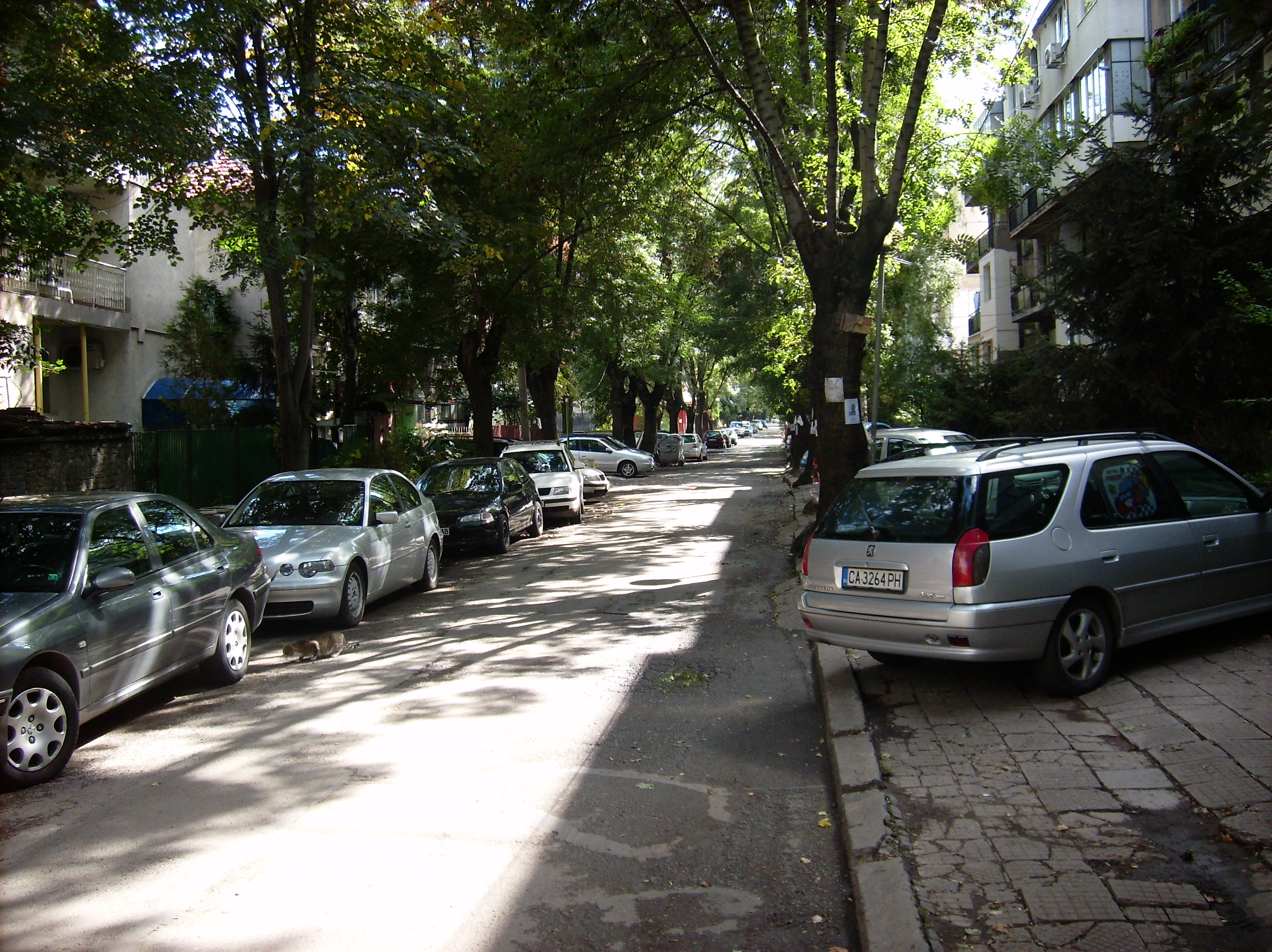
A view of the Street named after Eugene Schuyler in Sofia, Bulgaria (42°42.571′N 23°20.953′E)

Mount Schuyler on Graham Land in Antarctica is named after Eugene Schuyler "who investigated the crushing of the Bulgarian April Uprising of 1876 and co-authored the draft decisions of the subsequent 1876 Constantinople Conference." Streets in the Bulgarian cities of Sofia, Plovdiv, Varna and Panagyurishte are named after him.

Between the many curious things Schuyler found in Russian Turkestan is worth mentioning the figure of the iskatchi as it is/was frequent in Wales, (Great Britain), the person sprinkling salt and bread over a corpse at a funeral and eating later such bread to clean the deceased man of his sins, sometimes for a fee.
