= Cornell Catholic Community =

The Cornell Catholic Community is the Catholic organization and parish at Cornell University, which provides worship services and community for the university's Catholic students. Its current director is Father Daniel McMullin.

== History ==
=== 19th century ===
In 1888, Catholic students at Cornell University organized the Cornell Catholic Union, one of the first organized Catholic groups at a secular or Protestant university.

=== 20th century ===
One of the earliest presidents of the Cornell Catholic Community was William Artingstall, a 1900 Cornell alumnus. At the time, Catholic students at Cornell did not have an outlet for the expression of their community and beliefs. Most students were Protestant and gathered at Sage Chapel for Protestant worship services. In the early 1900s, the organization was renamed the Newman Club. Similar groups began at the University of Michigan in 1889, Brown University in 1892, and Harvard University in 1893.

Cornell's Newman Club, like most, was composed mainly of Irish students and was primarily a literary society, with a strong element of dancing and socializing. Over time, the goals of the group became more intellectual and political.

In 1929, Father James Cronin became the first priest to join the Cornell Newman Club on a full-time basis. The same year, Cornell United Religious Work was founded, one of the first interfaith campus organizations in history. In 1936, Father Donald Cleary arrived on campus, overseeing the community as chaplain for 25 years. Under his leadership, Cornell's Newman Club grew to be the largest in the United States.

Over the 1960s, the Catholic student body at Cornell and the Cornell Newman Club underwent changes as societal changes, including the sexual and cultural revolutions in the U.S., combined with new currents of thought and spirituality springing out of the reforms of the Second Vatican Council, implemented between 1962 and 1965, created a period of intense discourse and activity over the role and meaning of the Catholic Church across the nation and at Cornell. The size of the overall Cornell student body grew and, along with other Ivy League universities, Cornell became more open to people from more diverse backgrounds and less elite social classes, which resulted in a marked increase in the number of Catholic students at Cornell.

In 1966, during this period of change, Father Daniel Berrigan, a Jesuit priest, became assistant director of Cornell United Religious Work, the umbrella organization for all religious groups on campus, including the Cornell Catholic Community. In 1968, Berrigan entered a government office in Catonsville, Maryland, which housing drafts cards and napalmed 378 of them, in protest of the Vietnam War. On October 3, 1968, on the eve of his trial, Berrigan addressed a crowd of over 2,000 in Bailey Hall to explain why he was prepared to face 50 years of imprisonment for his action.

In 1970, the Newman Club was renamed the Cornell Catholic Community, marking the Catholic group's development into a full-fledged parish. This reflected a widespread move away from the social-club structure of previous Catholic college organizations and towards a campus ministry structure. The move to self-identify as a 'campus ministry', a term already in widespread use by Protestant groups, reflected the ever more widespread cultural diffusion between Catholics and Protestants taking place as the 20th century unfolded.

Berrigan was convicted and sentenced to prison to begin on April 9, 1970. According to Anke Wessels, director of Cornell's Center for Religion, Ethics, and Social Policy, "On the very day he was scheduled to begin his prison term, he left his office keys on a secretary's desk in Anabel Taylor Hall and disappeared." Cornell celebrated Berrigan's impending imprisonment by conducting a weekend-long "America Is Hard to Find" event on April 17–19, 1970, which included a public appearance by the then-fugitive Berrigan before a crowd of 15,000 in Barton Hall. On August 11, 1970, the FBI later found and arrested Berrigan, who was released from prison in 1972.

Many chaplains came and went over the course of a short period of time, reflecting and exacerbating the social difficulties of the 1960s and 1970s.

Cornell hired Charles E. Curran as a visiting professor while he was the center of an academic freedom controversy. Curran was removed from the faculty of Catholic University of America in 1986 as a dissident who unapologetically maintained the right to dissent from official Church teachings which had not been issued as ex cathedra statements. He maintains in his 1986 "Faithful Dissent" that Catholics who may dissent nevertheless accept the teaching authority of the Pope, bishops and the Congregation for the Doctrine of the Faith. In 1986, the Vatican declared that although a tenured professor, Curran could no longer teach theology at Catholic University of America schools, because "clashes with church authorities finally culminated in a decision by the Sacred Congregation for the Doctrine of the Faith, headed by then-Cardinal Josef Ratzinger, now Pope Benedict XVI, that Curran was neither suitable nor eligible to be a professor of Catholic theology." The areas of dispute included publishing articles that debated theological and ethical views regarding divorce, "artificial contraception", "masturbation, pre-marital intercourse and homosexual acts." Curran later became a full tenured professor at Southern Methodist University, and the American Association of University Professors censured CUA for his firing.

In 1983, Father Michael Mahler became chaplain. Mahler consolidated the community, instituting new programs and reforms, and established a new foundation for growth in membership. Soon thereafter the Community started a new outreach to Catholic alumni to raise funds and awareness.

=== 21st century ===
In 2002, Father Robert S. Smith became director, instituting a peer ministry program, Taizé meditation groups, and the Emmaus Bible Study groups.

In 2006, Father Daniel McMullin, Cornell Catholic Community's current director, became director. In 2012, Father McMullin was hired as Associate Director of Cornell United Religious Work. Father Carsten Martensen, director of the Ithaca College Catholic Community, was hired to serve the Catholic Communities on both campuses. In 2019, Fr. Carsten was removed from his position following allegations of sexual abuse, which were first received by the USA Northeast Province of the Jesuits. Father McMullin returned to replace Carsten.
