= Robert Smith (priest) =

American Catholic priest, author, and educator

Father Robert S. Smith
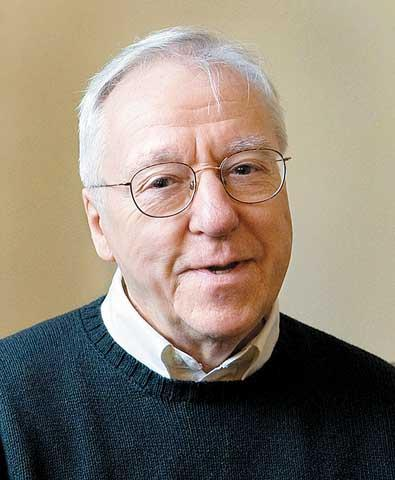

Director of the Cornell Catholic Community

Personal details
- Born: February 7, 1932 St. Albans, Queens
- Died: July 27, 2010 (aged 78) Sayre, Pennsylvania
- Website: Father Bob's homilies on YouTube

Robert S. Smith (February 7, 1932 – July 27, 2010) was an American Catholic priest, author, and educator. His interests ranged from philosophy and theology to the ethics of medical care to interfaith dialogue. Smith's homilies explored the mystery and challenge of religious faith, the relationship between modern culture and the struggle to pursue Christian life, and the paradoxical, complex nature of the spiritual journey. He founded the Sophia Center, devoted to engendering discourse among diverse scientific, cultural, and religious perspectives. He was the author of In the Image of God.

== Early life and education ==
Born on February 7, 1932, in St. Albans, New York, a neighborhood in Queens, Smith attended St Francis Prep High School, and Cathedral College of the Immaculate Conception. Smith studied for the priesthood at the Seminary of the Immaculate Conception in Huntington, New York, becoming ordained on May 31, 1958. In that same year, he pursued graduate studies in philosophy at the Catholic University of Leuven, Belgium, completing them in 1961, whereupon he became associate pastor at St. Lawrence Martyr in Sayville, New York.

== Career ==
Later in 1961, Smith returned to the Seminary of the Immaculate Conception as a professor of philosophy. He taught at the seminary until 1970, then becoming director of the Newman Apostolate in Brentwood, New York and later chaplain at Hofstra University in Hempstead, New York in 1971. In 1975, Smith began 22 years at the State University of New York at Stony Brook as Director of Campus Ministries and Director of Chaplaincy Services at University Medical Center, Stony Brook. At Stony Brook's medical center, Smith initiated an overhaul of the hospital ministry, attempting to incorporate patient perspectives into how care was approached and provided. Father Smith used lectures, plays, music and art to educate medical students in how the sick experience illness. Weill Cornell Medical College's Humanities in Medicine program adopted his ideas in its program.

Smith founded the Sophia Center in 1997, an interfaith and multidisciplinary organization, with the goal of bringing scientific, cultural, and religious discourse together.

== In the Image of God ==
In 1988, Smith published In the Image of God, a book which explored the struggle to pray and enter into the mystery of the spiritual life. The book emphasized the need to engage the depths of our own experience, which was a principal way of coming to know the infinitely different Other that is God. Father Smith wrote, "A wise and very human monk once said to me that the things between God and us can be truthfully spoken about only in the way that friends talk to friends. I have tried to write down a partial record of such talk. I hope this book will help you to discover something more of the depths of your own self... in the image of God."

Peter Manchestor of SUNY Stony Brook's Center for Religious Studies noted that, "By profession I have many books to recommend on scripture, doctrine, history. This at last is one I can give to those who ask me about my faith, my struggle to pray, my attachment to the church. A redeeming presence illumines these quiet, intelligent and effortlessly authoritative reflections."

== Cornell University ==
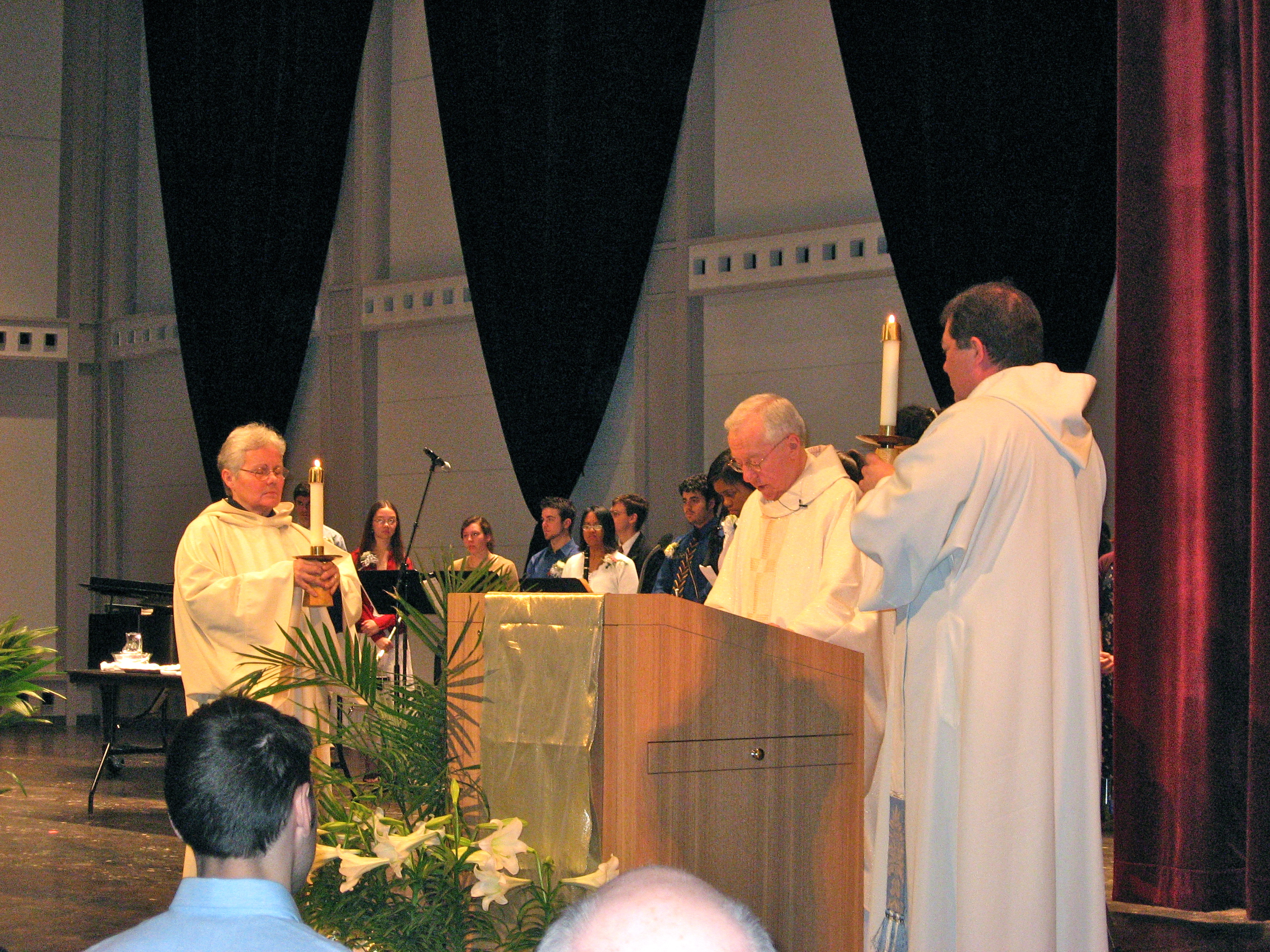
Father Bob (center), Father Dan (right), and Sister Donna (left) during mass in Bailey Hall

In 2002, Smith retired, moving to Ithaca, New York. He became the Robert R. Colbert Sr. '48 Catholic Chaplain and Distinguished Scholar. In 2003, Smith became the Director of the Cornell Catholic Community, establishing programs in theology, meditation, philosophy, and ecumenism. He founded a Taizé meditation and prayer group, a graduate student study group that incorporated rigorous and complex religious, philosophical, cultural, and scientific books in its reading lists, and a peer ministry program.

During his years as director, Smith, known colloquially as "Father Bob", established the Emmaus Bible Study Groups. Smith believed that the future of the Church lay in small groups sharing the scriptures together. The renewed emphasis on biblical study among the lay faithful reflected the Second Vatican Council's commitment to incorporating scripture more deeply into the life of the Catholic Church, as expressed in such documents as the Dogmatic Constitution on Divine Revelation.

Recordings of Smith's homilies were published online by the Cornell Catholic Community on their website and by RSS feed. The homilies commanded widespread respect and interest, integrating philosophical and mystical elements into an exploration of the depths of human experience and longing, as reflected in the Divine Mystery and its quest for intimacy with the human person.

On the 50th anniversary of his ordination as a Catholic priest, Smith inaugurated the Janus Essay Competition on May 31, 2008. The competition sought essays that reflected on life that has already been lived and life still left to live, in accordance with the nature of the Roman God Janus, who looks both backward and forward.

Smith enjoyed great popularity, both within the Catholic community at Cornell and with members of other religions as well as nonbelievers, to the extent that Pi Kappa Phi, a Cornell fraternity, made him an honorary member.

The Reverend Kenneth Clarke Sr., director of Cornell United Religious Work said, "Father Bob Smith was one of the best exemplars of the integration of the life of the mind and the life of the spirit, of erudition and inspiration, that I have known. His work left a deep impression with the students he served."

Smith died at 78 on July 27, 2010, after chemotherapy treatment for cancer. He is buried in the Cemetery of the Holy Rood in Westbury, New York, on his native Long Island.
