= Walter S. Grant =

U.S. Army major general (1878–1956)

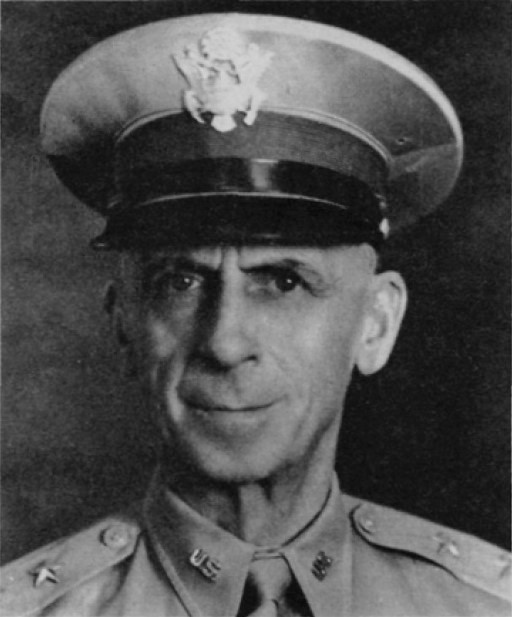
- From the October 1956 issue of Assembly magazine
- Born: January 24, 1878; Ithaca, New York, U.S.
- Died: March 3, 1956 (aged 78); Washington, District of Columbia, U.S.
- Burial place: West Point Cemetery
- Education: United States Military Academy; United States Army Command and General Staff College; United States Army War College
- Spouse: Marjorie Commiskey (m. 1910–1956)
- Children: 4
- Relatives: George W. Schuyler (grandfather); Charles Scribner (uncle); Walter S. Schuyler (uncle); Eugene Schuyler (uncle)
- Military career
- Service: United States Army
- Service years: 1900–1946
- Rank: Major General
- Service number: O1094
- Unit: U.S. Army Cavalry Branch
- Commands: 1st Telegraph Battalion; 1st Squadron, 3rd Cavalry Regiment; Fort Adams, Rhode Island; Citizens' Military Training Camp, Fort Adams; 13th Cavalry Regiment; 6th Cavalry Regiment; Commandant of the United States Army War College; New York Port of Embarkation; Fort Stotsenburg, Philippines; Philippine Division; Philippine Department; Third Corps Area
- Wars: Philippine–American War; China Relief Expedition; Pancho Villa Expedition; World War I Occupation of the Rhineland; World War II
- Awards: Army Distinguished Service Medal; Legion of Merit; Legion of Honor (Officer) (France); Order of Leopold II (Officer) (Belgium)

Walter S. Grant (January 24, 1878 – March 3, 1956) was a career officer in the United States Army. He served from 1900 to 1946 and attained the rank of major general. Grant was a veteran of World War I and World War II, and his awards included the Army Distinguished Service Medal and Legion of Merit.

A native of Ithaca, New York, Grant graduated from the United States Military Academy at West Point in 1900 and began a long career with the Cavalry branch. He served in the Philippine–American War and China Relief Expedition in the early 1900s, and was a longtime aide-de-camp for several department commanders. A 1915 graduate of the United States Army Command and General Staff College, Grant performed duty on the Texas-Mexico border during the 1916 Pancho Villa Expedition. During World War I, he served on the operations staffs of the American Expeditionary Forces headquarters in France, as well as several divisions and corps. During the Occupation of the Rhineland, he was chief of staff for I Corps.

After the First World War, Grant's assignments included command of Fort Adams, Rhode Island and the 13th Cavalry Regiment. During the 1930s and early 1940s, he was commandant of the United States Army War College, and commander of the Philippine Division, Philippine Department and Third Corps Area, and received promotion to major general. He reached the mandatory retirement age of 64 in early 1942, but remained on active duty for World War II and served a member of the War Department Personnel Board.

In retirement, Grant resided in Washington, D.C. He died at Walter Reed Army Medical Center on March 3, 1956, following an extended illness. Grant was buried at West Point Cemetery.

== Early life ==
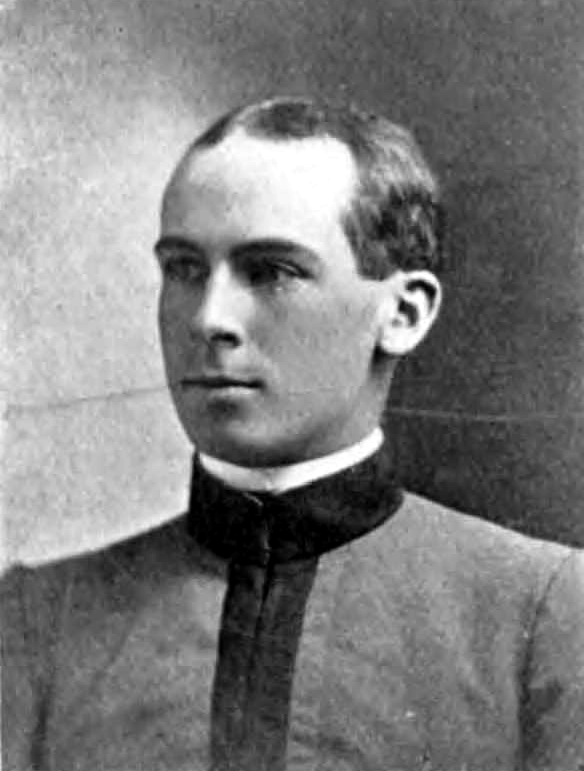
Grant at the time of his 1900 West Point graduation

Walter Schuyler Grant was born in Ithaca, New York on January 24, 1878, the son of Chauncey Lewis Grant Jr. and Martha (Schuyler) Grant. Grant was a member of New York's prominent Schuyler and Scribner families; he was a descendant of Philip Pieterse Schuyler and his grandmother was the sister of Charles Scribner. Grant's grandfather, George W. Schuyler, served as New York State Treasurer, and his uncles included army officer Walter S. Schuyler and diplomat Eugene Schuyler.

Grant attended Ithaca Graded School, and was an 1894 graduate of Ithaca High School where he was both class president and commencement speaker. In 1895, he obtained an appointment to the United States Military Academy at West Point. He attended Charles Braden's Highland Falls preparatory school for prospective cadets, then began attendance at the academy in 1896. Grant served in leadership roles as cadet corporal, first sergeant and captain until 1900, when he was returned to the ranks after taking part in protests against the academy's attempt to change the treatment of lower classmen by those in the upper classes. Grant graduated in 1900 ranked 18th of 54 and received his commission as a second lieutenant of Cavalry. Among his classmates who also attained general officer rank were Joseph A. Baer, Upton Birnie Jr., Archibald H. Sunderland, Augustine McIntyre Jr. and Charles M. Wesson.

== Start of career ==
Grant was assigned to the 6th Cavalry Regiment, and was immediately posted to the Philippines to take part in the Philippine–American War and the China Relief Expedition, which was the U.S. response to the Boxer Rebellion. In the Philippines, he was credited with the August 1901 capture of Martin Cabrera, a leader of the anti-U.S. insurgency. Grant was promoted to first lieutenant in February 1901.

After returning to the United States, Grant was assigned to the 3rd Cavalry Regiment, and served as aide-de-camp to Brigadier Generals William August Kobbé and Camillo C. C. Carr, successive commanders of the Department of Dakota. In 1905, he was posted to the Philippines with the 3rd Cavalry, and he was assigned as aide-de-camp to Major General Charles L. Hodges, who successively commanded the Department of the Visayas in the Philippines, and the Department of Dakota and Department of the Lakes in the United States. He was promoted to captain in March 1911. After his promotion, he performed duty with the 3rd Cavalry on the Texas-Mexico border.

In 1914, Grant completed the Army School of the Line as an honor graduate. He next served with the 9th Cavalry Regiment at Camp Harry J. Jones, Arizona, then the 3rd Cavalry at Fort Sam Houston, Texas. In 1915, he graduated from the United States Army Command and General Staff College, after which he was detailed to the Signal Corps. As commander of a company in the 1st Telegraph Battalion, then commander of the battalion, he performed Texas-Mexico border duty during the Pancho Villa Expedition. From February to June 1917, he was assistant Signal officer on the staff of the Department of the East.

== Continued career ==
With the army expanding for World War I, Grant served on the operations staff at the United States Department of War. On August 5, he was promoted to temporary major, and lieutenant colonel, after which he was assigned to the operations section (G-3) on the staff of the American Expeditionary Forces in France. During his service on the AEF staff, Grant took part in the Battle of Cantigny. As a member of the 2nd Division staff, he participated in the Battle of Château-Thierry.

While on the 42nd Division staff, Grant was a participant in the Champagne–Marne campaign. As a member of the First Army staff, he was a participant in the Battle of Saint-Mihiel. While a member of the I Corps staff, Grant took part in the Meuse–Argonne offensive. He was promoted to temporary colonel in August 1918, and at the end of the war he was serving as First Army's deputy chief of staff. After the war, Grant served as I Corps chief of staff during the U.S. Occupation of the Rhineland.

Grant received the Army Distinguished Service Medal for his wartime service. The citation read:

The President of the United States of America, authorized by Act of Congress, July 9, 1918, takes pleasure in presenting the Army Distinguished Service Medal to Colonel (Cavalry) Walter Schuyler Grant, United States Army, for exceptionally meritorious and distinguished services to the Government of the United States, in a duty of great responsibility during World War I. As Deputy Chief of Staff of the 1st Army, by his high professional attainments and ability Colonel Grant rendered valuable assistance in the staff work preparatory to and during the St. Mihiel and Argonne-Meuse offensives. As Chief of Staff of the 1st Army Corps, he displayed the same tact, zeal, and energy which marked the previous character of his services.

Service: Army Rank: Colonel Division: 1st Army Corps, American Expeditionary Forces General Orders: War Department, General Orders No. 50 (1919)

After returning to the United States in early 1919, Grant was assigned to the War Department staff. In March 1920 he was reduced to his permanent rank of major. In July 1920, he was promoted to permanent lieutenant colonel. In 1921, he was posted to the Command and General Staff College, where he served as an instructor, chief of the faculty's command section, and assistant director of the school. In 1923, he began attendance at the United States Army War College, after which he remained at the school as an instructor, then was assigned as director of the school's command section.

From July 1926 to June 1927, Grant was director of the War Plans Division on the army staff. He was then assigned as executive officer of the 3rd Cavalry at Fort Ethan Allen, Vermont. When the Great Vermont Flood of 1927 took place in early November, Grant helped coordinate federal participation in relief efforts, for which he was commended by the commander of the First Corps Area. In 1928, he was assigned to command the regiment's 1st Squadron. In January 1929, he was promoted to permanent colonel and assigned to command Fort Adams, Rhode Island; during the summer of 1929, he commanded the Citizens' Military Training Camp that was held at Fort Adams. In September 1929, he was assigned to command the 13th Cavalry Regiment at Fort Riley, Kansas.

== Later career ==
In July 1931, Grant was assigned as chief of staff for the First Corps Area in Boston. From January 1934 to March 1935 he commanded the 6th Cavalry Regiment at Fort Oglethorpe, Georgia. In April 1935, he was assigned as assistant commandant of the Army War College. In March 1936, Malin Craig was assigned as Chief of Staff of the United States Army, and Grant was promoted to brigadier general and named to succeed Craig as commandant. From July 1937 to March 1938, he commanded the New York Port of Embarkation. He then returned to the Philippines, where he was assigned to command the post at Fort Stotsenburg.

In October 1938, Grant was promoted to major general. From October 1938 to July 1939 he commanded the Philippine Division, and from July 1939 to June 1940 he was commander of the Philippine Department. After returning to the United States, he was assigned to command the Third Corps Area, where he served from June 1940 until January 1942, when he reached the mandatory retirement age of 64. As the army expanded following U.S. entry into World War II, Grant was recalled to active duty the day after his official retirement, and he served as a member of the War Department Personnel Board until May 1946, when he retired for the second time. Grant received the Legion of Merit to recognize his wartime service.

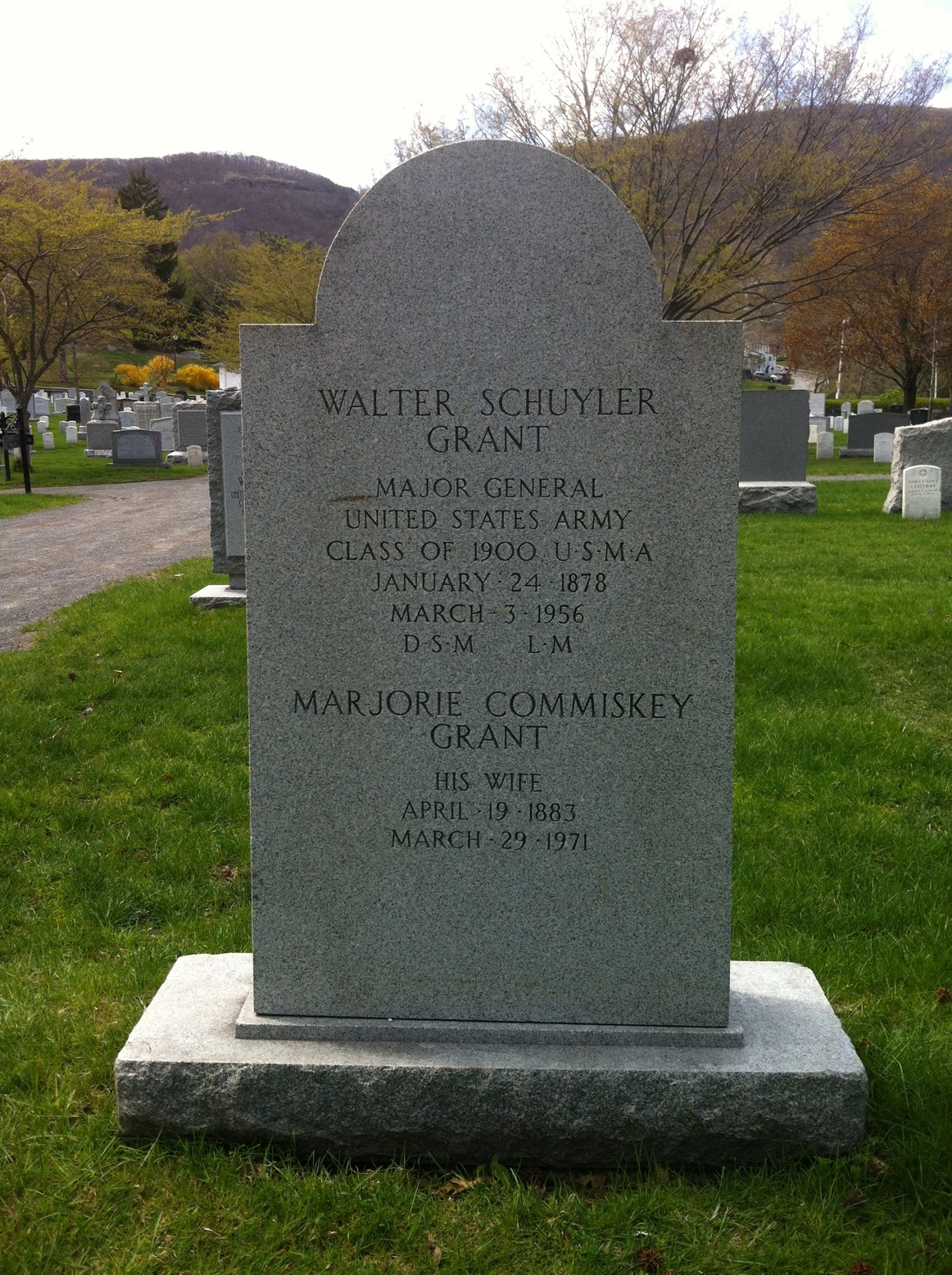
Grant's grave marker at West Point Cemetery

Grant's additional awards included the Philippine Campaign Medal, China Campaign Medal, Mexican Border Service Medal, World War I Victory Medal with four battle clasps, Army of Occupation of Germany Medal, American Defense Service Medal, American Campaign Medal, and World War II Victory Medal. His foreign awards for the First World War included the French Legion of Honor (Officer) and Belgian Order of Leopold II (Officer).

== Retirement and family ==
In retirement, Grant was a resident of Washington, D.C. He died at Walter Reed Army Medical Center on March 3, 1956. Grant was buried at West Point Cemetery.

In 1910, Grant married Marjorie Commiskey of Brooklyn. They were the parents of four children. Sons Walter and Philip both attained the rank of colonel in the army. Son Francis was an operations executive with United States Lines. Daughter Marjorie was the wife of Lieutenant General Hugh M. Exton.
