= George W. Schuyler =

American politician (1810–1888)

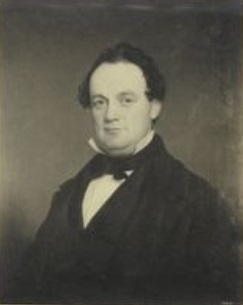
- Reproduction of 1848 portrait by Francis Bicknell Carpenter

Member of the New York State Assembly from Tompkins Co.
- In office January 1, 1875 – December 31, 1875
- Preceded by: William L. Bostwick
- Succeeded by: Samuel D. Halliday

New York State Treasurer
- In office January 1, 1864 – December 31, 1865
- Governor: Horatio Seymour; Reuben Fenton
- Preceded by: William B. Lewis
- Succeeded by: Joseph Howland

Personal details
- Born: George Washington Schuyler; February 2, 1810 Stillwater, New York
- Died: February 1, 1888 (aged 77) Ithaca, New York
- Party: Free Soil; Republican; Liberal Republican; Democratic
- Spouse: Matilda Scribner
- Children: Eugene Schuyler; Evelyn Schuyler Schaeffer; Martha Schuyler Grant; Walter S. Schuyler; Kate Bleecker Schuyler
- Parent(s): John Harmanus Schuyler; Annatje Fort
- Education: New York University

George Washington Schuyler (February 2, 1810 – February 1, 1888) was an American businessman, author, politician, and member of the prominent Schuyler family.

== Early life ==
George Washington Schuyler was born on February 2, 1810, in Stillwater, New York, the son of Annatje (née Fort) Schuyler (1770–1851) and John Harmanus Schuyler (1763–1846), the private secretary of John Barker Church. His siblings included Henry Ten Broeck Schuyler, Phillip Church Schuyler, Catherine Angelica Schuyler (wife of Nicholas Bleecker), and Rebecca Sarah Margaret Schuyler.

His paternal grandparents were Harmanus Schuyler (a son of Nicholas Schuyler and Elsie (née Wendell) Schuyler) and Christina Ten Broeck (a daughter of Samuel Ten Broeck and Maria (née Van Rensselaer) Ten Broeck).

His family moved to Ithaca, New York in 1811. There, he worked on the family farm and attended the public schools. At age sixteen, he began to work at a drugstore and learned this trade. In 1834, he enrolled at New York University and graduated in 1837.

== Career ==
After graduating from college, Schuyler returned to Ithaca and opened his own drugstore.

In 1848, he entered politics as a Free Soiler, and was trustee of the Village of Ithaca for two years. In 1855, he was among the founders of the Republican Party in Tompkins County. He was a delegate to the 1860 and 1864 Republican National Conventions.

He was elected New York State Treasurer in 1863, besting the incumbent William B. Lewis with 314,303 votes to Lewis' 284,618. Schuyler, who was elected on the Union ticket nominated by the Republicans and War Democrats, served from 1864 to 1865. He was appointed by Governor Reuben Fenton as the superintendent of the New York State Banking Department, and served from 1866 to 1871.

=== New York State Assembly ===
In 1872, Schuyler joined the Liberal Republicans, and later became a Democrat. He was a candidate against John H. Selkreg for the New York State Senate in 1873 and 1875, but was defeated both times. In 1874, he was elected as a member of the New York State Assembly, representing Tompkins County in 98th New York State Legislature.

After serving in the Assembly, he was appointed by Governor Samuel J. Tilden as auditor of the Canal Department, a position he held for nearly five years.

Schuyler served as a trustee of Cornell University from its foundation, and treasurer from 1868 to 1874. In 1885, he published Colonial New York: Philip Schuyler and His Family (Charles Scribner's Sons; 2 volumes), a valuable resource of Dutch origins, history, and genealogy in the Albany region.

== Personal life ==
Schuyler was married to Matilda Scribner (1809–1898), the daughter of Uriah Rogers Scribner and Martha Scribner. Matilda was a half-sister to Charles Scribner (1821–1871), the founder of Charles Scribner's Sons. Together, they were the parents of:

- Eugene Schuyler (1840–1890), a writer and diplomat.
- Martha Schuyler (1842–1922), who married Chauncey Lewis Grant Jr. (1834–1887) and was the mother of Major General Walter S. Grant
- Evelyn Schuyler (1846–1942), who married Charles Ashmead Schaeffer (1843–1898).
- Walter S. Schuyler (1850–1932), who married Mary Miller Gardiner, later Elizabeth Stanton. Career Army officer who retired as a brigadier general in 1913.
- Kate Bleecker Schuyler (1853–1859), who died young.

Schuyler died in Ithaca on February 1, 1888. After his death, his widow married Isaac Remsen Lane (d. 1910).

Political offices
| Preceded by William B. Lewis | New York State Treasurer; 1864–1865 | Succeeded by Joseph Howland |
New York State Assembly
| Preceded by William L. Bostwick | New York State Assembly; Tompkins County; 1875 | Succeeded by Samuel D. Halliday |
