= Walter S. Schuyler =

U.S. Army brigadier general (1849–1932)

Walter Scribner Schuyler
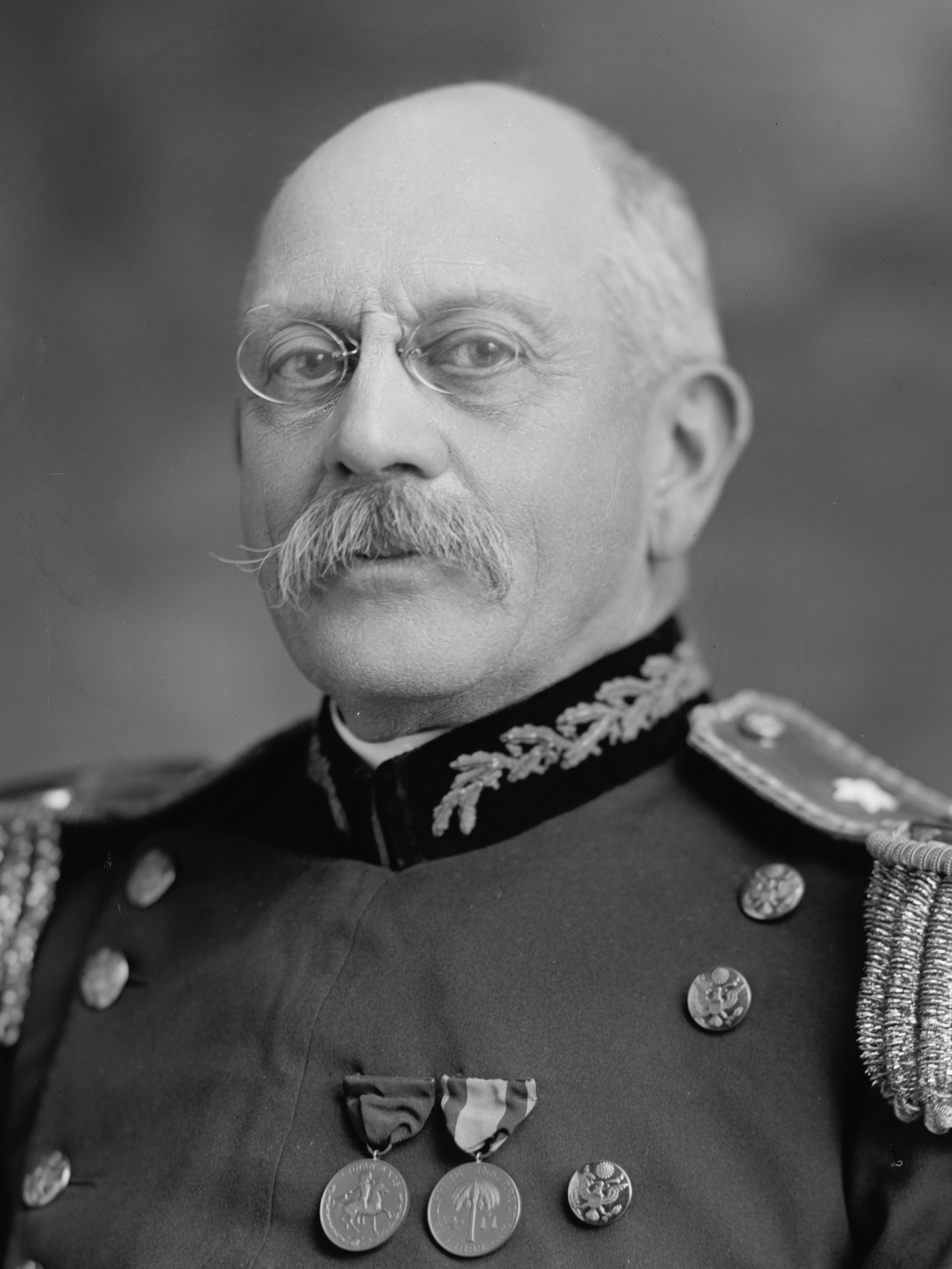
- Born: April 26, 1849; Ithaca, New York, U.S.
- Died: February 17, 1932 (aged 82); Presidio of San Francisco, California, U.S.
- Burial place: Arlington National Cemetery
- Spouse(s): Mary Miller Gardiner (m. 1883-1902, her death); Elizabeth Tamson Stanton (m. 1921-1932, his death)
- Children: 1
- Relatives: George W. Schuyler (father); Eugene Schuyler (brother); Charles Scribner (uncle); Charles Ashmead Schaeffer (brother-in-law)
- Military career
- Allegiance: United States of America
- Branch: United States Army
- Service years: 1870–1913
- Rank: Brigadier General
- Unit: Cavalry Branch
- Commands: Troop H, 5th Cavalry Regiment; 203rd New York Volunteer Infantry Regiment; 46th United States Volunteer Infantry Regiment; Paso Caballos, Cuba; 5th Cavalry Regiment; Fort Huachuca; Fort Ethan Allen; Schofield Barracks; Department of California; Military District of Hawaii; Fort Riley; Mounted Service School; Department of the Colorado; Independent Cavalry Brigade; Department of California; 8th Brigade
- Conflicts: American Indian Wars: Yavapai War; Great Sioux War of 1876; Spanish–American War: Puerto Rico campaign; Philippine–American War: Cavite campaign; Mexican Border War
- Awards: Order of the Double Dragon (China); Order of Saint Stanislaus (Russia)
- Other work: President and General Manager, Sierra-Alaska Mining Company

Walter Scribner Schuyler (April 26, 1849 – February 17, 1932) was a career officer in the United States Army. A veteran of the American Indian Wars, Spanish–American War, Philippine–American War, and Mexican Border War, he attained the rank of brigadier general. A Cavalry officer, he carried out several high-profile command assignments over the course of his military service, including the 5th Cavalry Regiment and Military District of Hawaii.

A native of Ithaca, New York, Schuyler graduated from West Point in 1870 and began his military career as a second lieutenant in the 5th Cavalry Regiment. He served in the western United States throughout the 1870s and 1880s, and took part in the Yavapai War and Great Sioux War of 1876. During the Spanish–American War and Philippine–American War, he was promoted to temporary colonel and commanded volunteer Infantry regiments.

During the later part of his career, Schuyler was an observer in Manchuria during the Russo-Japanese War, and commanded an independent cavalry brigade in San Antonio during the Mexican Border War. He retired in 1913, and worked as president and general manager of California's Sierra-Alaska Mining Company. He died at the Presidio of San Francisco on February 17, 1932, and was buried at Arlington National Cemetery.

== Early life ==
Walter S. Schuyler was born in Ithaca, New York, on April 26, 1849, the son of George W. Schuyler and Matilda (Scribner) Schuyler. (Note: The Biographical Register gives Schuyler's birth year as 1849. His Association of Graduates obituary and his tombstone indicate 1850. Other sources indicate a birth year of 1850 or 1851. Since he retired upon reaching the mandatory retirement age in April 1913, and the mandatory retirement age was 64, 1849 is presumably correct.) He was a member of New York's prominent Schuyler family, and traced his lineage back to Philip Pieterse Schuyler the first prominent member of the family to settle in North America. Through his mother, Schuyler was a member of the prominent Scribner family, and his relatives included his uncle Charles Scribner.

Schuyler was educated in the schools of Ithaca and graduated from Ithaca Academy. He was then selected for attendance at the United States Military Academy, from which he graduated in 1870 ranked 20th of 58. He was assigned to the Cavalry branch and commissioned as a second lieutenant in the 5th Cavalry Regiment.

== Start of career ==
Schuyler was assigned to frontier duty at Fort D. A. Russell, Wyoming, from October 1870 to December 1871. From July to November 1871, Schuyler escorted a surveying party in Wyoming. From February to June 1872 he was posted to Fort McDowell, Arizona. Assigned to scouting duty during the Yavapai War, Schuyler took part in several engagements, to include the Santa Maria Mountains (September 22, 1872), Sycamore Creek (October 19, 1872), Rio Verde (November 16, 1872), and Gila River (January 16, 1873).

From February 1873 to February 1875, Schuyler commanded the 5th Cavalry's Indian Scouts during duty at the Rio Verde Reservation and on scouting duty. This service included participation in engagements at East Fork (December 4, 1873), Cave Creek (December 23, 1873), Cañon Creek (January 10, 1874), Superstition Mountain (March 25‑26), and Mescal Mountains (May 17–18, 1874). After an extended leave of absence from February 1875 to February 1876, Schuyler was posted briefly to Fort Hays, Kansas, then assigned to duty as aide-de-camp to General George Crook, commander of the Department of the Platte. He was promoted to first lieutenant on July 29, 1876, and remained on Crook's staff until 1882. Schuyler took part in the Great Sioux War of 1876, including the Battle of Slim Buttes from September 9 to 10.

From January 1882 to April 1883, Schuyler was on frontier duty with the 5th Cavalry at Fort Sidney, Nebraska. From April to July 1883 he was on duty at Fort McKinney, Wyoming. In the summer of 1883, Schuyler lead a surveying party through Yellowstone National Park. From September 1883 to October 1886, he was assigned as professor of military science at Cornell University. He then returned to duty with the 5th Cavalry, this time at Fort Reno, Oklahoma, where he remained until May 1887. In April 1887, Schuyler received promotion to captain. He served with the 5th Cavalry at Fort Riley, Kansas, from May 1887 to July 1889. From July 1889 to October 1890 he served at Fort Elliott, Texas.

== Continued career ==
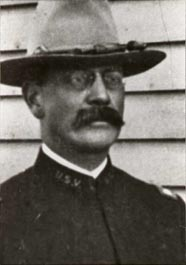
Schuyler during the Spanish–American War

Schuyler commanded Troop H, 5th Cavalry at Fort Sill, Oklahoma, from October, 1890 to February 1893. From March to December 1893 he was on duty at the World's Columbian Exposition in Chicago. He commanded his troop at Fort Sam Houston, Texas, from February 1894 to December 1895 and at Fort Ringgold, Texas, from January to September 1896. From October 1896 to April 1898, Schuyler was again assigned as professor of military science at Cornell University.

At the start of the Spanish–American War in May 1898, Schuyler was promoted to major of United States Volunteers and assigned as mustering officer at Camp Black, near Garden City, New York. In June, he was appointed adjutant of 2nd Division, Second Corps. In July, Schuyler was promoted to colonel of volunteers and assigned to command the 203rd New York Volunteer Infantry Regiment. He organized and trained his regiment at Camp Black, Camp George Meade, Pennsylvania, and Camp Wetherill near Greenville, South Carolina. Schuyler was mustered out of the volunteers on March 25, 1899.

From April to September, Schuyler served with the 5th Cavalry in Puerto Rico. In August 1899, he was again commissioned as a colonel in the volunteers, this time as commander of the 46th United States Volunteer Infantry. In October 1899, he was promoted to the permanent rank of major in the 2nd Cavalry Regiment. Schuyler organized and trained his new regiment at Camp Framingham, Massachusetts. He commanded the 46th Volunteer Infantry during the Philippine–American War, including engagements in Cavite Province. In April 1901, the 46th Volunteers returned to San Francisco. Schuyler mustered out of the volunteers in May, and returned to his permanent rank of major.

Schuyler served with the 2nd Cavalry in Cuba, posted to Matanzas Province from September to December 1901, and Cienfuegos Province as commander of the post of Paso Caballos from December 1901 to April 1902. After returning to the United States, Schuyler served with the 2nd Cavalry at Fort Ethan Allen, Vermont, from April to July 1902 and Fort Myer, Virginia, from July 1902 to May 1903. He was promoted to lieutenant colonel in February 1903.

From June to December 1903, Schuyler was commander of the post at Fort Ethan Allen. from December 1903 to May 1904, Schuyler served with the 2nd Cavalry in the Philippines. He was assigned to duty with the Army general staff in 1904 and assigned as military attaché and observer with the Imperial Russian Army in Manchuria during the Russo-Japanese War and traveled to Shanghai, Peking and Mukden. Schuyler was present at the battles of Wafango, and Liaoyang. In December 1904, he traveled by the Trans-Siberian Railway to the Russian capital of Saint Petersburg and then Hamburg, Germany. From January to April 1905, he was on duty at the War Department, where he prepared reports about his experiences as an observer. Schuyler served as chief of staff of the Army's Southwestern Division from April 1905 to September 1906. In August 1906, he was promoted to colonel.

== Later career ==
From September 1906 to May 1907, Schuyler was commander of the 5th Cavalry and the post at Fort Huachuca, Arizona. From May 1907 to April 1908 he was posted to Albany, New York, as military adviser to the state commission that inquired into the training and readiness of New York's National Guard and Naval Militia. He returned to command of the 5th Cavalry and Fort Huachuca from April 1908 to January 1909. From January to October 1909, he was commander of the 5th Cavalry and the post now known as Schofield Barracks, Hawaii.

Schuyler commanded the Department of California from October 1909 to December 1909. In April 1910, Schuyler was detailed to temporary duty as escort for Prince Zaitao of China on his trip through the United States. He commanded the Military District of Hawaii from May to December 1910. From November to December 1910, he served on the Army general staff. In January 1911, Schuyler was promoted to brigadier general. From January to February 1911, Schuyler commanded Fort Riley and the Mounted Service School.

From February to March 1911, Schuyler commanded the Department of the Colorado with headquarters at Fort Huachuca. From March to July 1911, he took part in the Mexican Border War as commander of the Independent Cavalry Brigade of the Maneuver Division that was based in San Antonio, Texas. From July 1911 to June 1912, Schuyler commanded the post at Fort Riley. From June 1912 to February 1913, he was commander of the Department of California, with headquarters at Fort Miley. From July to September 1912, Schuyler simultaneously commanded a Camp of Instruction on the Mexican border. From February to April 1913, he commanded the 8th Brigade at the Presidio of San Francisco. Schuyler retired on April 26, 1913, having reached the mandatory retirement age of 64.

== Awards ==
On February 27, 1890, Schuyler received a brevet promotion to first lieutenant to recognize his heroism in Arizona from 1872 to 1874. On the same day, he received a brevet promotion to captain to recognize his gallantry in battle at Bighorn Mountains, Montana, on November 25, 1876.

Schuyler received the New York State Spanish–American War Medal. In addition, he received the Order of the Double Dragon from the Imperial Government of China. He also received the Order of Saint Stanislaus (second class) and the Russo-Japanese War Medal from the Imperial Government of Russia.

== Family ==
In 1883, Schuyler married Mary Miller Gardiner (1854-1902). They were the parents of a daughter, Angelica Van Rensselaer Schuyler (1885-1887).

In March 1921, Schuyler married Elizabeth Tamson Stanton (1885-1941) in Del Monte, California. She was the daughter of Henry Martin Stanton, who had served as secretary and treasurer of the Central Vermont Railway. The Schuylers resided in Carmel-by-the-Sea, California.

Among Schuyler's siblings was Eugene Schuyler, a prominent American diplomat. In addition, his sister Evelyn was the wife of Charles Ashmead Schaeffer, who served as president of the University of Iowa. His sister Martha was the mother of Major General Walter S. Grant.

== Later life and death ==
After retiring from the military, Schuyler worked for several years as President and General Manager of California's Sierra-Alaska Mining Company. During World War I, he was offered the opportunity to return to active duty as U.S. military attaché in Paris, but planned surgery for a throat condition followed by an expected six-month convalescence compelled him to decline. Schuyler died in Letterman Army Hospital at the Presidio of San Francisco on February 17, 1932. He was buried at Arlington National Cemetery.

== Notes ==
Preceded by First	Commanding General of Military District of Hawaii; 1909 – 1910	Succeeded by Homer W. Wheeler
