= Timeline of New York City =

This article is a timeline of the history of New York City in the U.S. state of New York.

== Prior to 1700s ==
- 1524 – Giovanni da Verrazzano, the first European to see New York Harbor arrives and names it Nouvelle-Angoulême.
- 1613 – Juan (Jan) Rodriguez became the first documented non-Native American to live on Manhattan Island. He is considered the first immigrant, the first person of African heritage, the first person of European heritage, the first merchant, the first Latino, and the first Dominican to settle in Manhattan.
- 1614 – Dutch settle on Manhattan Island.
- 1624 – New Amsterdam is founded by the Dutch West India Company. In May 1624, the first settlers in New Netherland arrived on Noten Eylandt (Nut or Nutten Island, now Governors Island).
- 1625 – Dutch Fort Amsterdam built.
- 1626
  - Lenape sell Manhattan Island to Dutch.
  - Chattel slavery introduced to North America with the unloading of 11 Africans.
- 1639 – Jonas Bronck, a Swedish settler bought 500 acres of land from the Lenape tribe, creating a settlement called "Bronck's Land", soon after this settlement would be known as The Bronx.
- 1643 – Kieft's War between Lenape or Wappinger and Dutch colonists. Events partially took place within what would become the five boroughs.
- 1648 – First fire wardens (Martin Krieger, Thomas Hall, Adrian Wyser, and George Woolsey) appointed by Peter Stuyvesant
- 1650 – Population: approximately 1,000
- 1652 – City of New Amsterdam incorporated.
- 1653 – "Burgher government" established.
- 1654 – Sephardi Jews arrive from the Iberian Peninsula form Congregation Shearith Israel, the oldest Jewish congregation in the U.S.
- 1656 – Streets laid out.
- 1657 – Flushing Remonstrance signed laying foundation of religious freedom in America.
- 1659 – Labor strike by bakers.
- 1664 – September 24 – New Amsterdam is ceded by Peter Stuyvesant to England. It is renamed "New York" after James, Duke of York.
- 1665
  - June 12: Thomas Willett was appointed as the city's first mayor.
  - Wallabout Bay in Brooklyn location of first recorded murder trial - Albert Wantanaer accused of killing Barent Jansen Blom.
- 1666 – Thomas Delavall was appointed as the city's second mayor.
- 1667
  - Town becomes part of England per Treaty of Breda (1667).
  - Thomas Willett became mayor for the second time, and only the third overall mayor of the city.
- 1668
  - First yellow fever epidemic in the city.
  - Cornelius Van Steenwyk was appointed as the fourth mayor of the city.
- 1672 – Boston Post Road constructed.
- 1673 – The Dutch regain New York, renaming it "New Orange" (from February 1673 to November 1674).
- 1674 – The Dutch cede "New York" permanently to England after the Third Anglo-Dutch War, per Treaty of Westminster (1674).
- 1678 – Thomas Delavall was reappointed as mayor for the third and last time, and 11th overall.
- 1686 – The Dongan Charter establishes the municipality of New York City.
- 1691 – Fish market established.
- 1696 – King's Arms coffee house in business.
- 1697 – First Trinity Church erected.

== 1700s ==
- 1702 – Yellow fever epidemic kills more than 500 people.
- 1703
  - Federal Hall facing Wall Street, New York's city hall, built.
  - 42% of households enslaved people, second in the colonies only to Charleston.
- 1704 – The Society for the Propagation of the Gospel sends Elias Neau to minister to enslaved African Americans in North America. He establishes the first school that was open to African-Americans in New York City.
- 1709 – Founding of Trinity School (New York City), oldest continuously operated school in New York City.
- 1711 – Formal slave market established at Wall Street and the East River.
- 1712 – April: New York Slave Revolt of 1712.
- 1723 – Population: 7,248.
- 1733 – New York Weekly Journal begins publication.
- 1741 – Fear around slavery results in the New York Conspiracy of 1741 when 100 people were hanged, exiled or burned at the stake.
- 1752 – St. George's Chapel built.
- 1754
  - King's College (later Columbia College) established.
  - New York Society Library, oldest cultural institution in New York, later serving as the first Library of Congress.
- 1756 – Population: 13,046.
- 1762 – Queen's Head Tavern (later named Fraunces Tavern) in business.
- 1765 – Stamp Act Congress meets in city.
- 1766 – St. Paul's Chapel built.
- 1767 – John Street Theatre opens.
- 1771 – New York Hospital founded.
- 1774 – Population: 22,861.
- 1775 – Bowne & Co. printers, founded by descendants of John Bowne of the Flushing Remonstrance, established at 39 Pearl Street. Until 2010 it was the oldest publicly traded company in the United States.
- 1776
  - David Mathews becomes the city's 43rd mayor, getting arrested in June 22 for a plot to kill George Washington.
  - July 9: Statue of George III demolished and melted down for shot / bullets at Bowling Green square.
  - August 27: Continental Army routed by British Army troops in the Battle of Long Island, also known as the Battle of Brooklyn.
  - September 15: British troops capture lower Manhattan following the Landing at Kip's Bay on the East River.
  - September 15: American troops stand off British troops in Battle of Harlem Heights in northern Manhattan.
  - September 21: Approximately 1000 houses, a quarter of the city, are destroyed in the Great Fire of 1776 a week after British troops captured the city during the American Revolution. Arson is speculated (with Gen. George Washington and the British being among those blamed) and, during a round-up of suspicious persons by British forces, Nathan Hale is arrested.
  - September 22: Execution of Nathan Hale by the British as a spy.
  - November 16: Battle of Fort Washington, as Royal Navy warships sail north up the Hudson River and attack Forts Washington and Lee; British now controlling the river and in power in the area.
- 1778 – August 3: Fire near Cruger's Wharf destroys 64 homes.
- 1780 – Black population reaches 10,000; New York becomes the center of free Black life in North America.

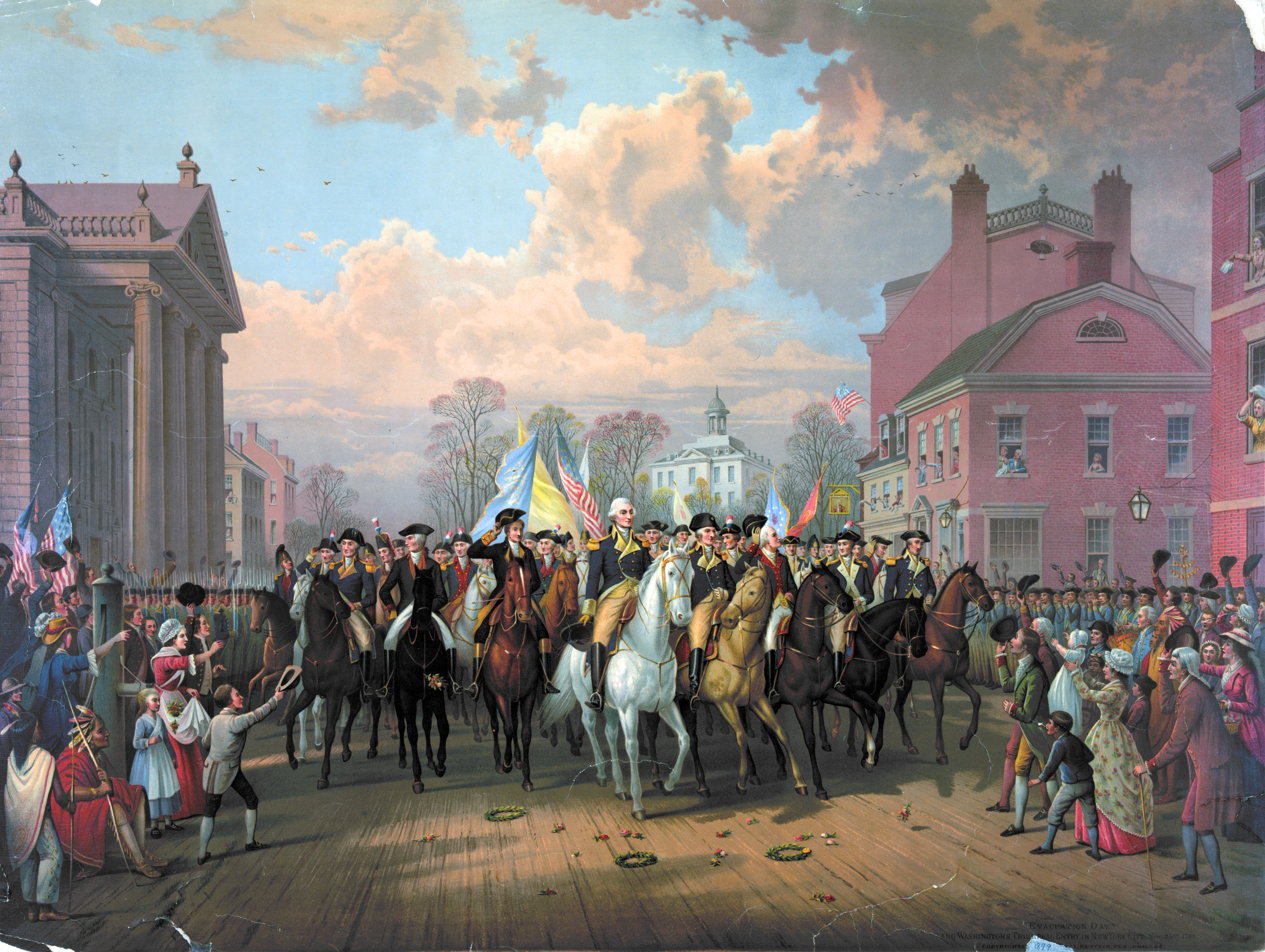
Evacuation Day (19th-century depiction)

- 1783 – November 25: British troops depart; New Yorkers celebrate Evacuation Day, the day Gen. George Washington returned to the city with his Continental Army and the last British forces left the newly recognized independent United States. War veteran John Van Arsdale climbs up a greased pole to remove the Union Jack left in defiance by the British, replacing it with the Stars and Stripes.
- 1785 – New York Manumission Society founded.
- 1786 – First Mass held in St. Peter's Church on Barclay Street, the city's first Catholic Church.
- 1787
  - October 27: The Federalist Papers begin publication.
  - New-York African Free-School founded.
- 1789
  - March: 1st United States Congress begins.
  - April 30: Inauguration of Washington as U.S. president.
- 1790
  - January 8: U.S. president Washington delivers country's first State of the Union Address.
  - February: Supreme Court of the United States convenes.
  - Population: 33,131. New York becomes the largest city in America, surpassing Philadelphia.
- 1794 – Minor yellow fever epidemic leads to creation of Bellevue Hospital.
- 1795 – Yellow fever epidemic kills 732 between July 19 and October 12, from a total population of about 50,000.
- 1796
  - Mother African Methodist Episcopal Zion Church founded.
  - December 9: The "Coffee House Slip Fire" burns from the foot of Wall Street and East River to Maiden Lane.
- 1797 – Newgate Prison built.
- 1798 - The "great epidemic", a major yellow fever epidemic, kills 2086 people from late July to November.

== 1800s ==
=== 1800s–1840s ===
- 1800 – Population: 60,489.
- 1801 – New York Evening Post newspaper begins publication.
- 1802 – American Academy of the Fine Arts founded.
- 1804 – New-York Historical Society founded.
- 1805 – Yellow fever epidemic occurs, during which as many as 50,000 people are said to have fled the city.
- 1807 – College of Physicians and Surgeons of New York established.
- 1808 – Roman Catholic Diocese of New York established (later elevated to an archdiocese)
- 1809
  - Abyssinian Baptist Church established.
  - Irving's fictional History of New York published.
- 1810 – Scudder's American Museum in business.
- 1811
  - May 19: Close to 100 buildings burn down on Chatham Street.
  - Commissioners' Plan of 1811 lays out the Manhattan grid between 14th Street and Washington Heights.
- 1812 – New York City Hall built.
- 1816 – American Bible Society founded.
- 1817
  - New York Stock & Exchange Board established.
  - Staten Island Ferry established.
- 1818
  - Lyceum of Natural History established.
  - Brooks Brothers first opens on Catherine and Cherry Streets in Lower Manhattan.
- 1819 – Yellow fever epidemic occurs.
- 1820 – Apprentices' Library established.
- 1821
  - September 3: Norfolk and Long Island Hurricane causes a storm surge of 13 ft in one hour, leading to widespread flooding south of Canal Street, but few deaths are reported. The hurricane is estimated to have been a Category 3 event and to have made landfall at Jamaica Bay.
  - African Grove theatre founded.
- 1822
  - Last major outbreak of yellow fever in the city occurs.
  - Fulton Fish Market established.
- 1823 – The poem "A Visit from St. Nicholas", also known as "T'was the Night Before Christmas", first published anonymously, later attributed to Clement Clark Moore.
- 1824 - May 15: The boiler of steamship Aetna explodes as the ship is en route in New York Harbor. At least 10 passengers are killed, and many more seriously injured.
- 1825
  - Labor strike by United Tailoresses Society.
  - Juvenile House of Refuge begins operating.
  - Population: 166,136.
  - Up the Hudson River, Erie Canal begins operating.
- 1826 – Lord & Taylor clothier in business.
- 1827
  - July 4: Independence Day parade marks the end of slavery and full emancipation in New York.
  - Delmonico's cafe in business.
- 1828 – American Institute of the City of New York founded.
- 1829 – Workingmen's Party organized.
- 1830 – Sociedad Benéfica Cubana y Puertorriqueña formed.
- 1831 – University of the City of New York incorporated.
- 1832 – Cholera pandemic reaches North America. It breaks out in New York City on June 26, peaks at 100 deaths per day during July, and finally abates in December. More than 3500 people die in the city, many in the lower-class neighborhoods, particularly Five Points. Another 80,000 people, one third of the population, are said to have fled the city during the epidemic.
- 1833 – Harper & Brothers publisher in business.
- 1834
  - July: Anti-abolitionist riots (1834).
  - Convention for the Improvement of the Free People of Color held.
  - Park Avenue Tunnel (roadway) opens.
  - Cornelius Van Wyck Lawrence becomes mayor.
- 1835
  - September 7: The first performance is given at the newly built Franklin Theatre.
  - December 16: New York Stock Exchange and hundreds of other buildings are destroyed by the Great Fire, which rages for two days in the Financial District. Efforts to stop the fire are limited by sub-zero temperatures, which freeze water in hoses, wells, and the East River. Twenty-three insurance companies are wiped out by the resulting claims.
  - School of Law of the University of the City of New York established.
- 1836
  - Union Theological Seminary founded.
  - Astor House hotel in business.
- 1837 - Flour riot of 1837 destroys 500–600 barrels of flour and 1,000 bushels of wheat.
- 1838
  - Rutger's Institute established.
  - Halls of Justice built.
  - Tombs Prison begins operating.
  - Opening of Green-Wood Cemetery in Brooklyn.
- 1839
  - Astor Library founded.
  - Sunday Mercury newspaper begins publication.
- 1841 - July 25: Mary Cecilia Rogers, a young woman known popularly as "The Beautiful Cigar Girl", disappeared and her dead body was found floating in the Hudson River three days later. The details surrounding the case suggested she was murdered. The death of this well-known person received national attention for weeks. The story became immortalized by Edgar Allan Poe in his story "The Mystery of Marie Roget". Despite intense media interest and an attempt to solve the enigma by Poe, the crime remains one of the most puzzling unsolved murders of New York City.
- 1842
  - Croton Aqueduct begins operating.
  - Barnum's American Museum and Dodworth dancing school in business.
  - Philharmonic Society of New York and Board of Education established.
- 1844
  - Brady photo studio in business.
  - New York Yacht Club founded.
- 1845
  - Bowery Theatre opens.
  - New York City Police Department, and New York Art Union established.
  - Fire.
- 1846 – Stewart Dry Goods Store built.
- 1847
  - Free Academy of the City of New York founded (later City College of New York).
  - Madison Square Park and Astor Opera House open.
  - Grace Church built.
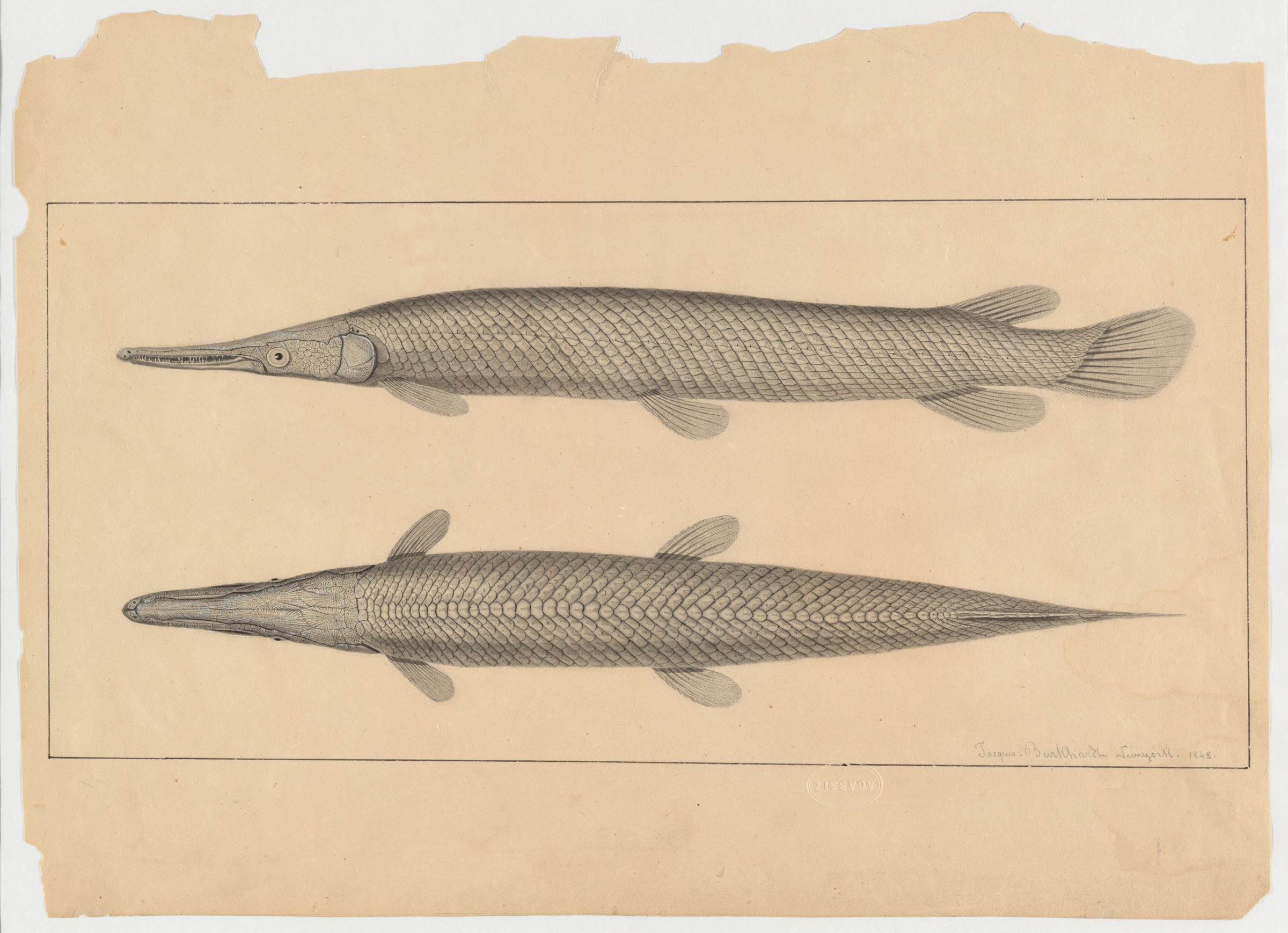
- 1848 pencil drawing of a side and top view of a needlefish caught in New York, N.Y., drawn by Jacques Burkhardt.
  1848

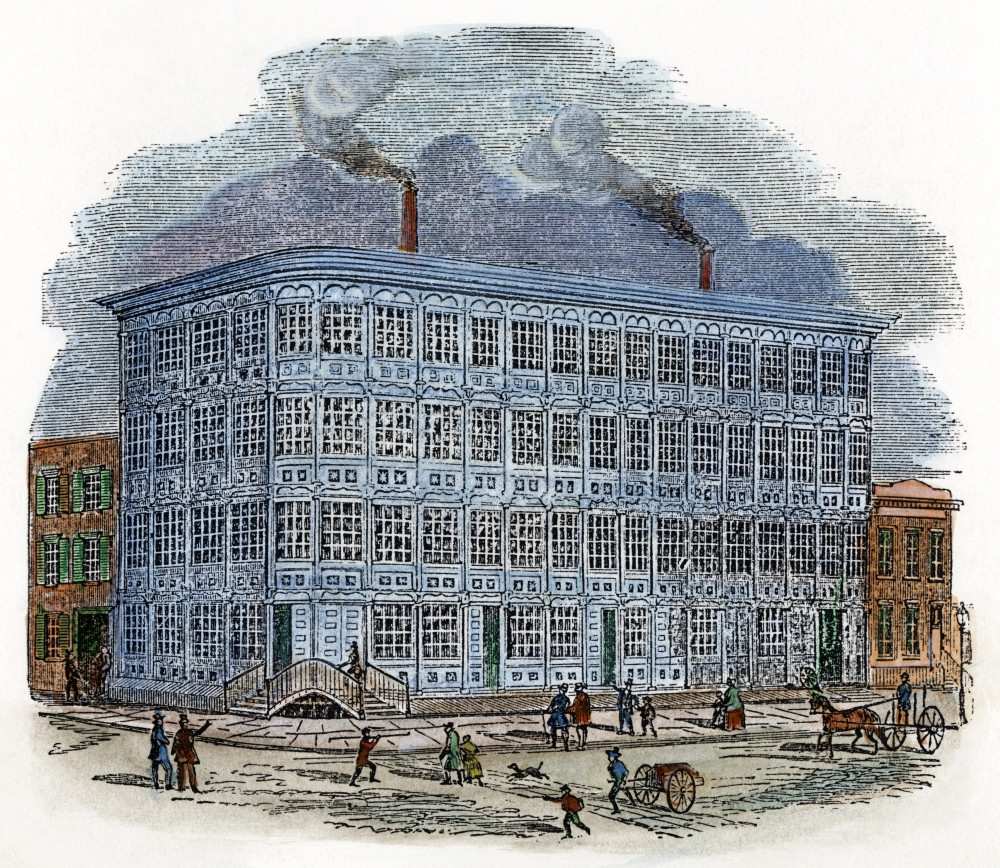
1851 print showing The Edward Laing Stores building, the first cast iron building in New York City

  - December: Cholera outbreak begins, its spread initially limited by winter weather. By June 1849, it reaches epidemic proportions. 5071 city residents are killed.
  - Associated Press established.
  - Trow's Directory of New York City begins publication.
  - Goupil Gallery branch in business.
- 1849
  - May 10: Astor Place Riot.
  - The Edward Laing Stores building, the first cast-iron building in the city designed by James Bogardus, is completed.

=== 1850s–1890s ===
==== 1850s–1860s ====
- 1850
  - Winter Garden Theatre built.
  - Harper's New Monthly Magazine begins publication.
  - John Wiley & Sons publisher in business.
  - Population: 550,394.
- 1851
  - New-York Daily Times newspaper begins publication.
  - Singer & Co. sewing machine manufacturer and Kiehl's pharmacy in business.
- 1852 – American Geographical Society headquartered in city.

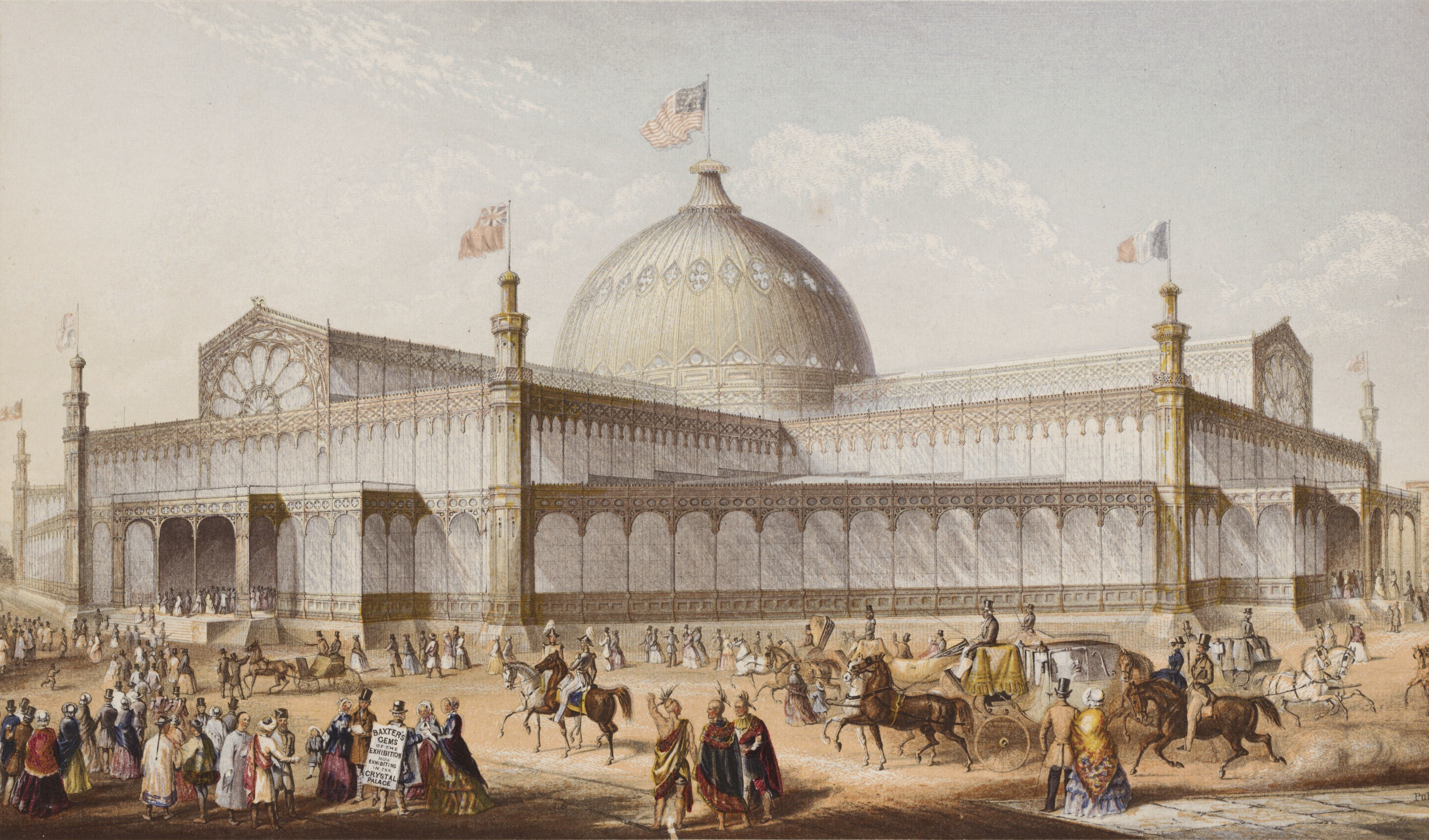
Exhibition of the Industry of All Nations

- 1853
  - Exhibition of the Industry of All Nations held.
  - New York Clipper begins publication.
  - Steinway & Sons piano manufacturer in business.
- 1854
  - Cholera epidemic kills 2,509.
  - Academy of Music opera house opens.
- 1855 – Fernando Wood becomes mayor.
- 1857
  - June 16: New York City Police Riot.
  - July: Dead Rabbits Riot.
  - American Institute of Architects headquartered in city.
- 1858
  - Central Park opens.
  - Saturday Press begins publication.
  - Lehman Brothers in business.
  - First all-star baseball game and first games in which admission is charged in Corona.
- 1859
  - Cooper Union for the Advancement of Science and Art established.
  - Weekly Anglo-African begins publication.
- 1860
  - New York World newspaper begins publication.
  - Population: 813,669.
- 1861 - G. Schirmer Inc. music publisher in business.
- 1862 - 1862 Brooklyn riot occurred August 4 between the New York Metropolitan Police against a white mob attacking African American strike-breakers at a Tobacco Factory.
- 1863
  - New York Draft Riots Over 100 are killed. The film Gangs of New York takes place during this time.
  - Manhattan College incorporated.
  - Great American Tea Company in business.
- 1865
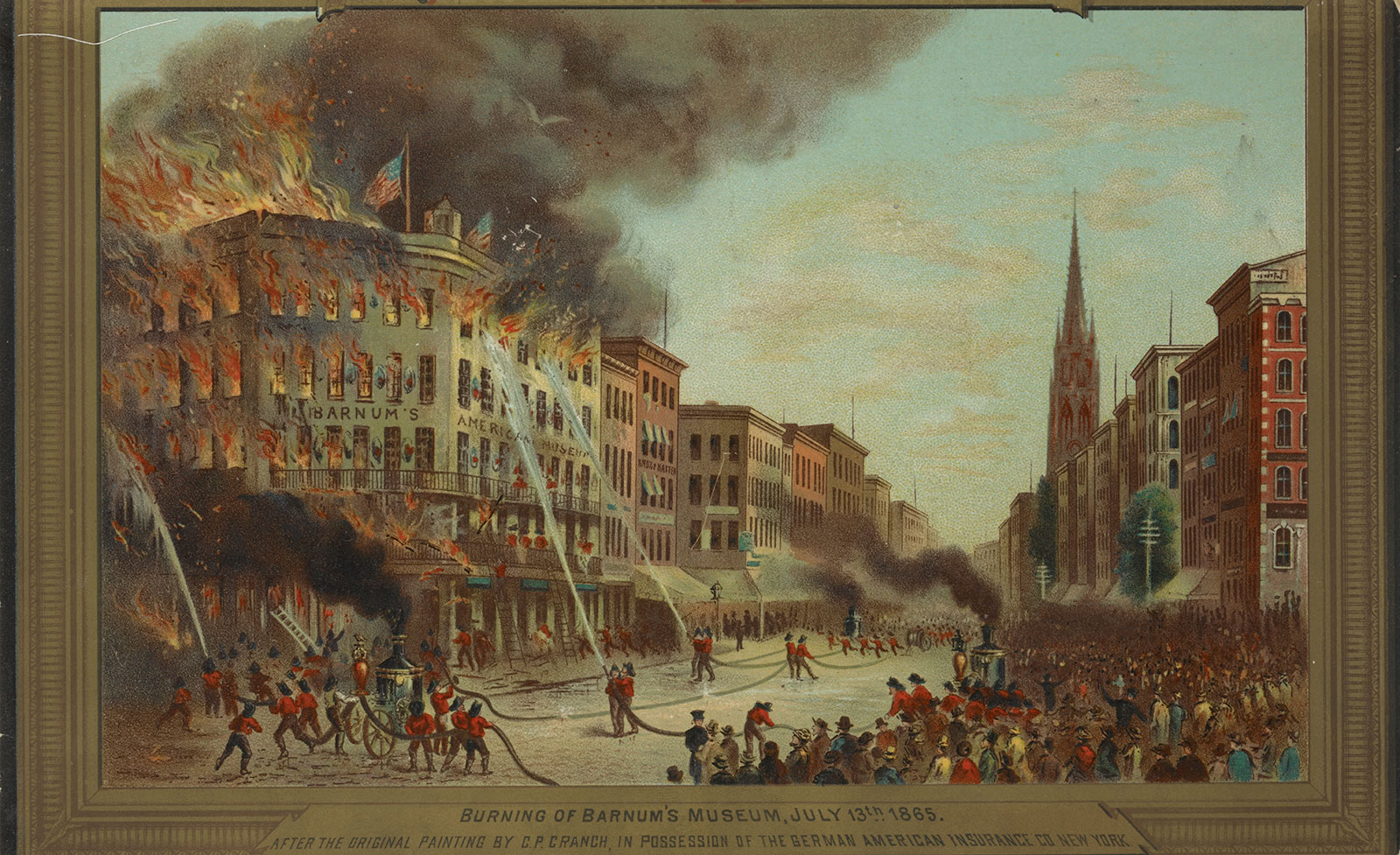
  Barnum's American Museum July 13th 1865 fire
  - Metropolitan Fire Department established.
  - Barnum's American Museum fire. Many animals are killed by the fire or by the police as they attempted to escape.
  - President Abraham Lincoln's funeral procession stops for a day, and Lincoln lies in state at City Hall
  - The Nation begins publication.
  - Roman Catholics constitute nearly half of the city's population due to heavy Irish immigration. Catholic schools educate approximately 18% of the city's 100,000 school-aged children.
- 1866
  - Cedar Tavern and A.A. Vantine (shop) in business.
  - Steinway Hall built.
  - Cholera epidemic kills "only" 1,137, its spread having been limited by the efforts of the new Metropolitan Board of Health, and enforcement of sanitation laws.
- 1867 - The first elevated transportation line was constructed by the West Side and Yonkers Patent Railway Company along Greenwich Street and Ninth Avenue.
- 1868

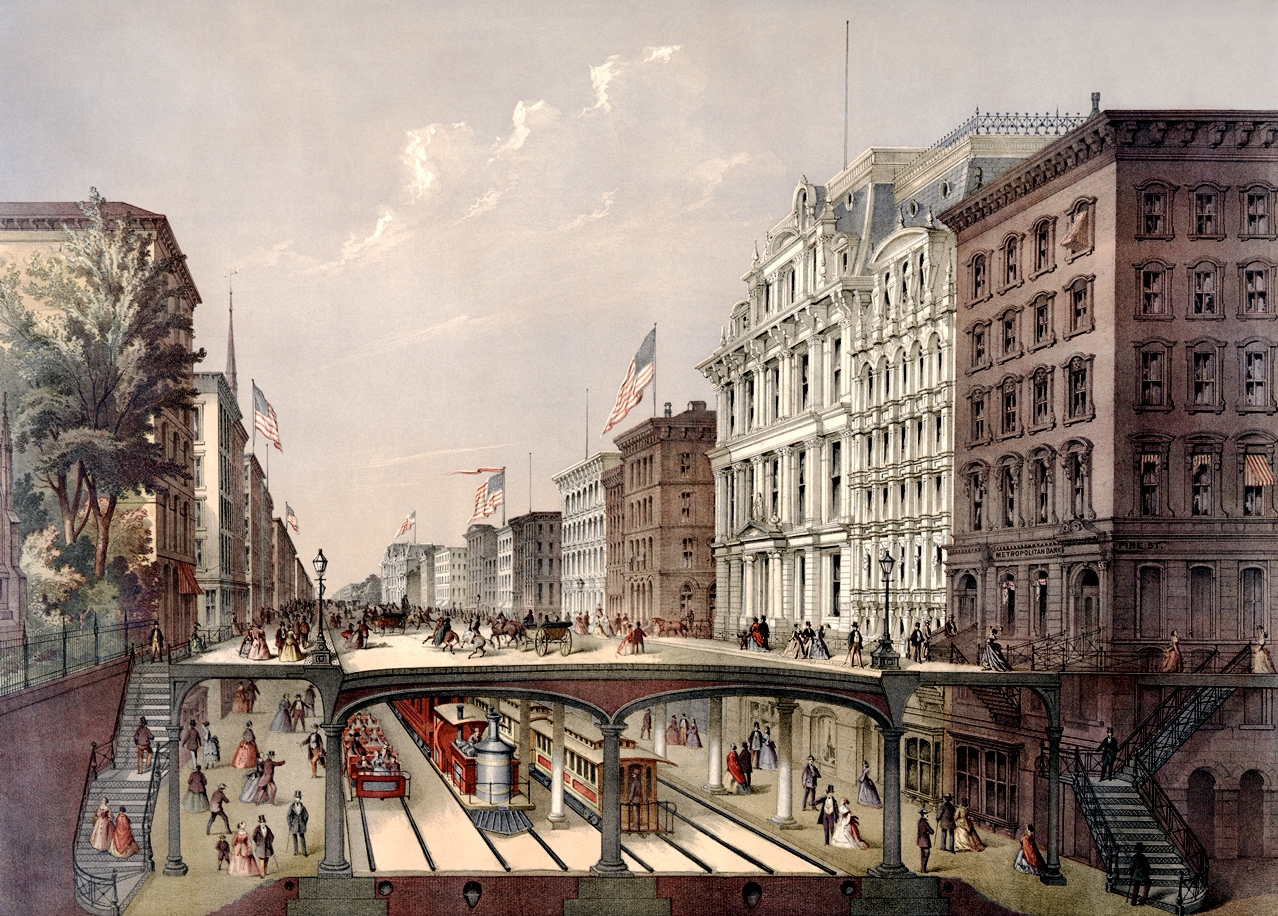
Proposed arcade railway underneath Broadway in 1868 (never built)

  - Pike's Opera House opens.
  - The Grand Hotel is built.
  - Temple Emanu-El is built.
  - An arcade railway underneath Broadway is proposed but never built.

==== 1870s ====
- 1870

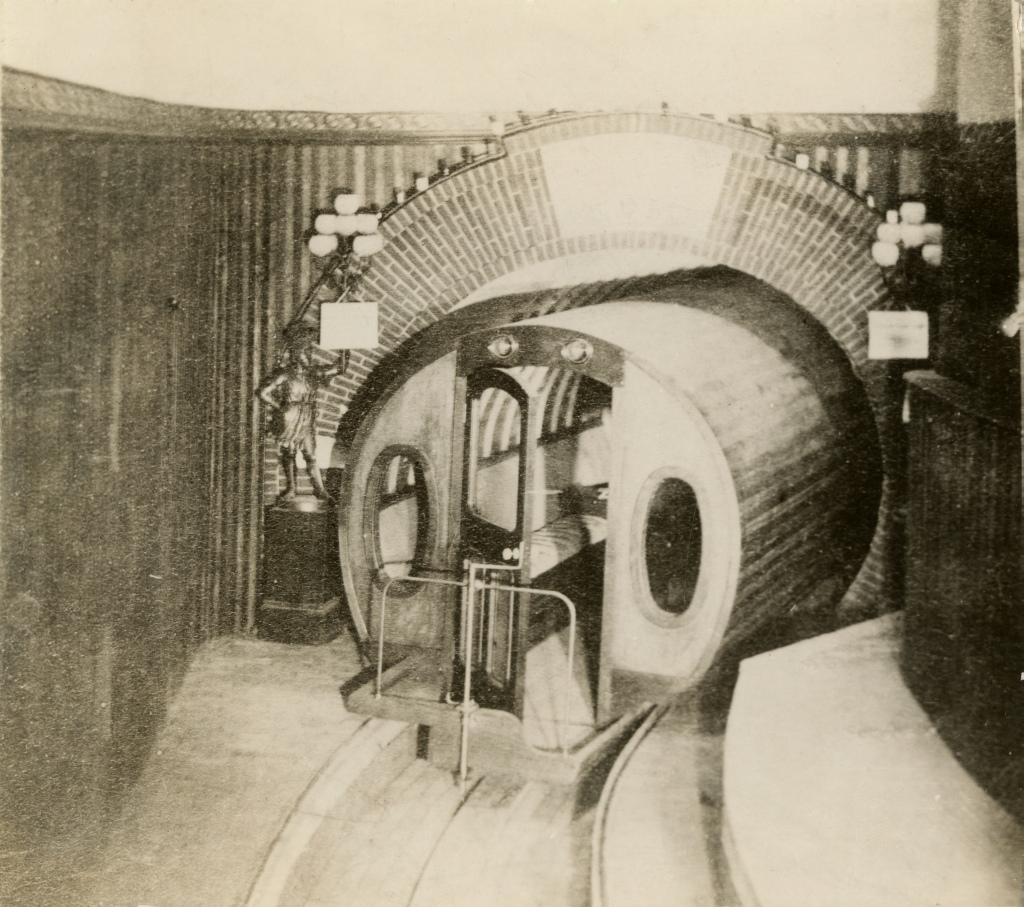
The Beach Pneumatic Transit (1870-1873)

  - Hunter College and Hunter College High School established.
  - Schwarz Toy Bazaar in business.
  - Lotos Club founded.
  - The Beach Pneumatic Transit is opened. Considered by many as the "first subway in NYC".
- 1871
  - July 12: Orange Riots.
  - July 30: A boiler explosion aboard the Westfield II Staten Island Ferry kills 125 among hundreds of Manhattanites making a weekend trip to the beaches.
  - Tweed scandal.
  - Grand Central Depot opens.
  - Washington Square Park redesigned.
  - Salmagundi Club founded.
- 1872
  - New York City exactly hits 1 million people.
  - May: Victoria Claflin Woodhull nominated by the Equal Rights Party to become the first woman Presidential candidate.
  - Metropolitan Museum of Art opens.
  - Bloomingdale's shop and Carl Fischer Music in business.
- 1873
  - New York Society for the Suppression of Vice founded.
  - Bellevue Hospital School of Nursing was founded. It was the first school of nursing in the United States to be founded on the principles of nursing established by Florence Nightingale. The School operated at Bellevue Hospital until its closure in 1969.
- 1874
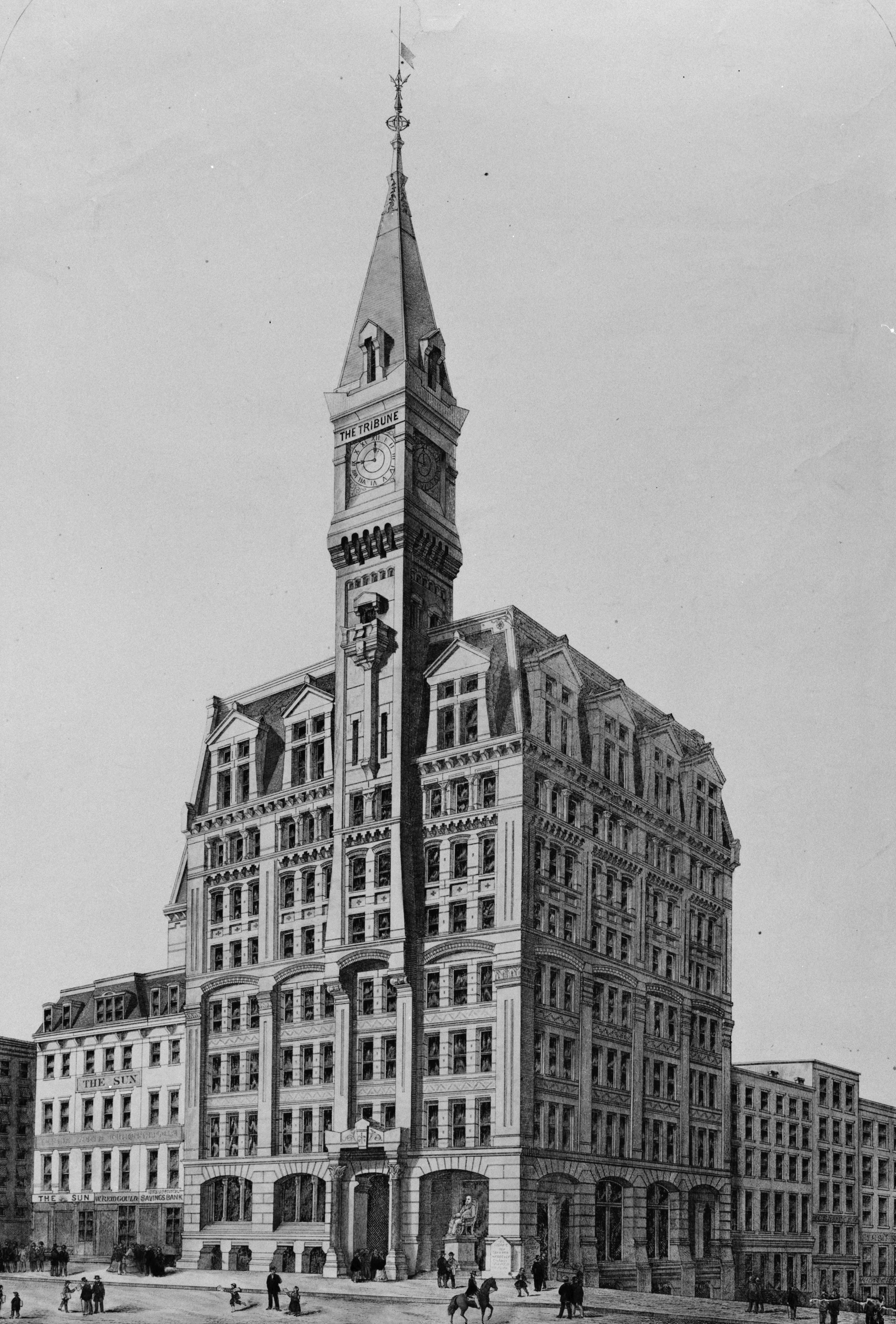
  1874 drawing of the New York Tribune Building (completed in 1875)

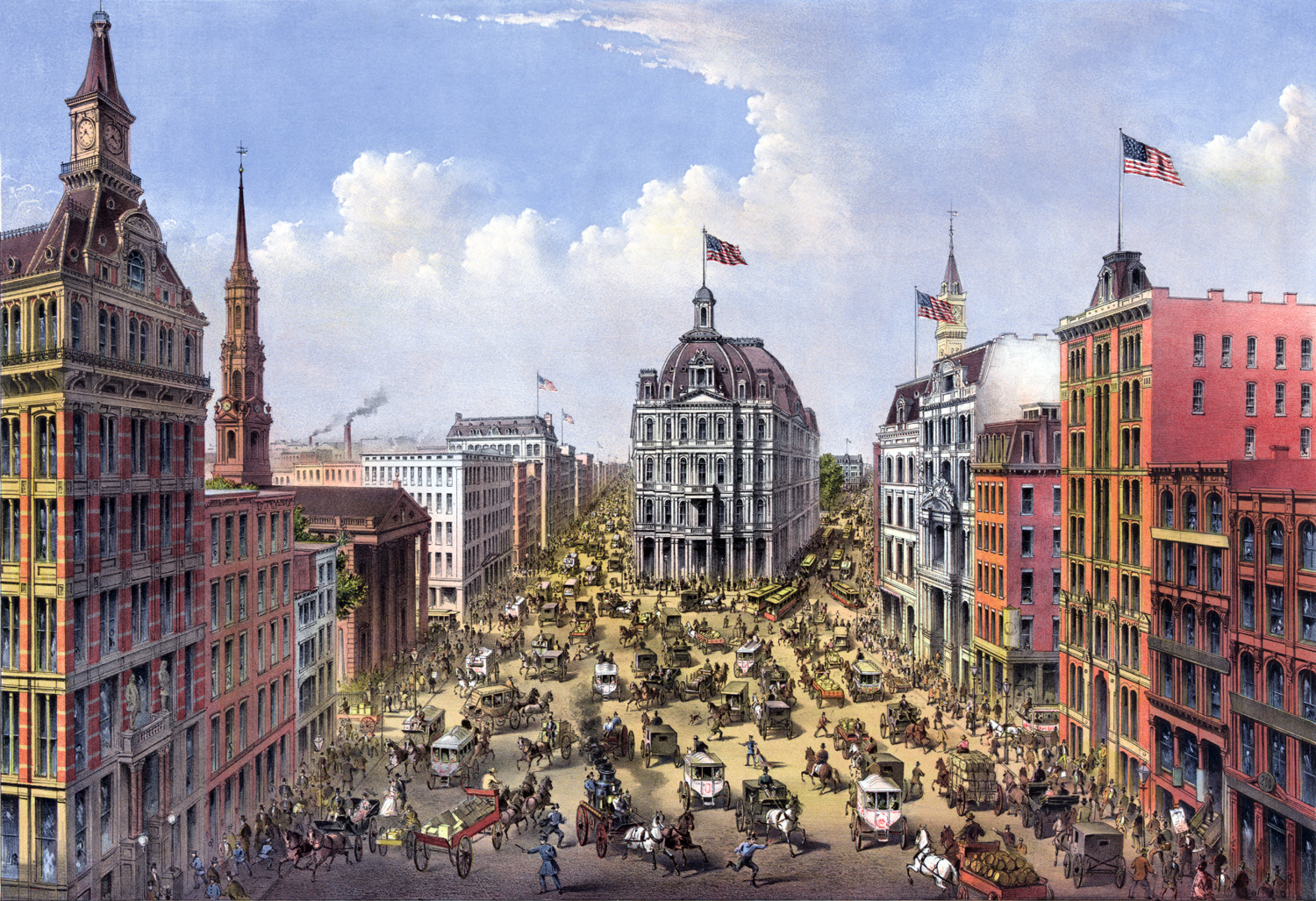
New York City in 1875, showing the Western Union Telegraph Building, the City Hall Post Office and Courthouse (New York City) and the Evening Post Building. The clocktower of the New York Tribune Building is visible in the background, behind the American Flag on the right.

  - January: Tompkins Square Riot (1874).
  - Young Men's Hebrew Association founded.
- 1875
  - Art Students League of New York and Coaching Club founded.
  - The New York Tribune Building and the Western Union Telegraph Building, early skyscrapers, are completed.
- 1876 - December 5: A stage lamp ignites scenery and starts the Brooklyn Theater Fire during a performance of "The Two Orphans", killing at least 276 people, primarily patrons in the upper gallery.
- 1877
  - Museum of Natural History building opens.
  - Lenox Library is completed
  - New York Society for Ethical Culture founded.
- 1878
  - October 27: Robbery of the Manhattan Savings Institution.
  - St. Patrick's Cathedral opens.
  - New York Symphony Society founded.
- 1879
  - Sullivan & Cromwell law firm in business.
  - First of four Madison Square Garden opens.

==== 1880s ====
- 1880
  - Metropolitan Opera Company founded.
  - Workingman's School active.
  - Population: 1,206,599.
- 1881 – William Russell Grace elected first Catholic mayor of New York.
- 1882
  - January 13: A train wreck occurs just south of Spuyten Duyvil Creek when a local train from Tarrytown crashes into the tail end of an express from Albany, which had been stopped on the tracks after someone pulled the emergency brake. Eight were killed, including a state senator.
  - September 4: Pearl Street Station (electric power plant) begins operating.
  - Goldman and Sachs and Luchow's restaurant in business.
- 1883
  - May 24: Brooklyn Bridge opens.
  - May 30: A rumor that the Brooklyn Bridge is going to collapse causes a stampede that kills 12.
  - November 18: Day of two noons.
  - Metropolitan Opera House (39th St) opens.
  - Life magazine begins publication.
- 1884
  - New York Cancer Hospital, Brearley School, and Grolier Club founded.
  - Hotel Chelsea and The Dakota built.
- 1885 – Standard Oil Building constructed.

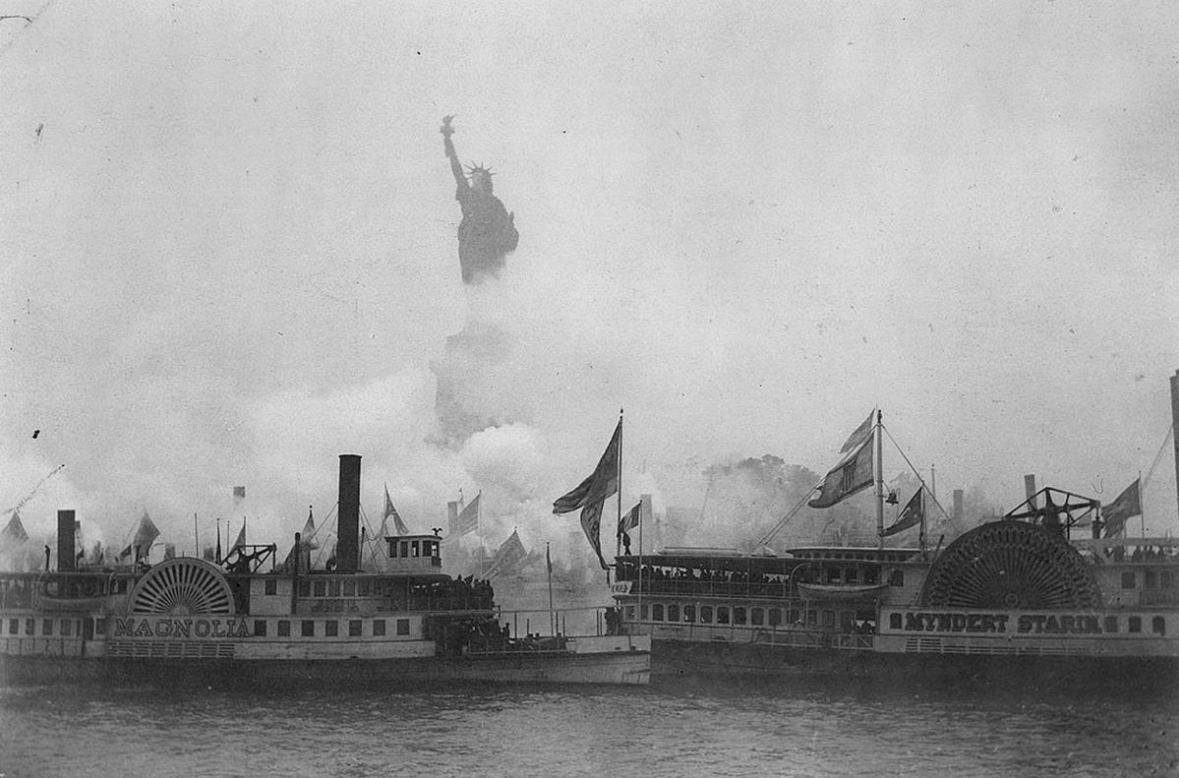
Inauguration of the Statue of Liberty, 1886

- 1886
  - October 28: Statue of Liberty dedicated.
  - Aguilar Free Library established.
- 1887
  - January 27: Port of New York Longshoremen's Strike begins.
  - Teachers College founded.
  - Scribner's Magazine begins publication.
- 1888
  - March 12–13: Great Blizzard of 1888, or "White Hurricane", paralyzes the Eastern seaboard from Maryland to Maine; in New York City causing temperatures to fall as much as 60 degrees. About 21 inches (53 cm) of snow fall on the city, but enormous winds whip it into drifts as much as 20 feet deep. Regionally, over 400 people are said to have died in the storm's path.
  - Washington Bridge built.
  - Katz's Delicatessen in business.
- 1889
  - American Fine Arts Society incorporated.
  - Childs Restaurant opens its first location at 41 Cortlandt St., in the old Merchants Hotel.

==== 1890s ====
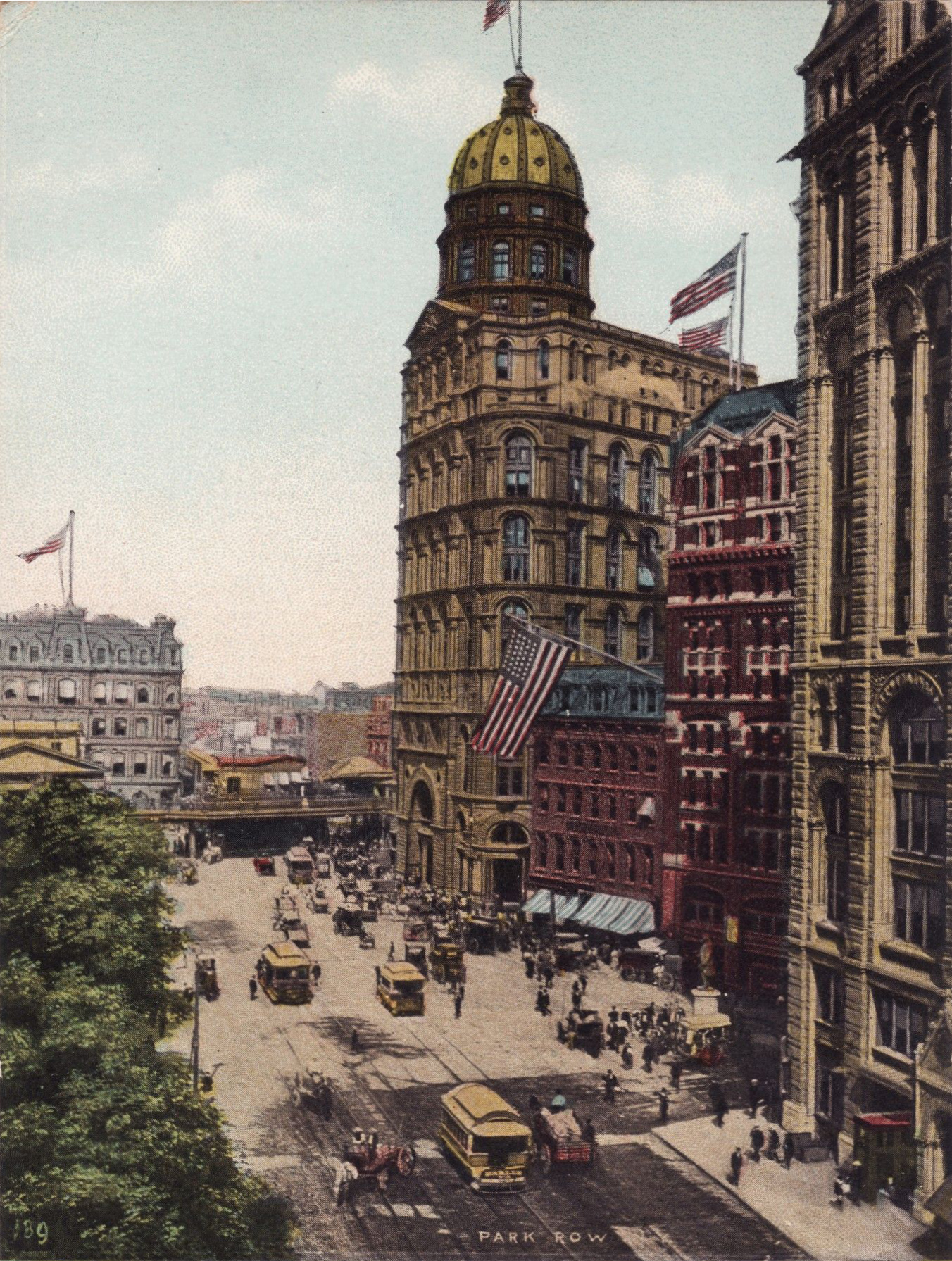
The New York World Building around 1899 - 1905

- 1890
  - The Demarest Building is completed. The world's first electric elevator was installed there
  - The New York World Building is completed with an architectural height of 309 feet, becoming the tallest in the city as well as the first skyscraper to overtop Trinity Church.
  - Publication of Riis' How the Other Half Lives.
  - Population: 1,710,715.

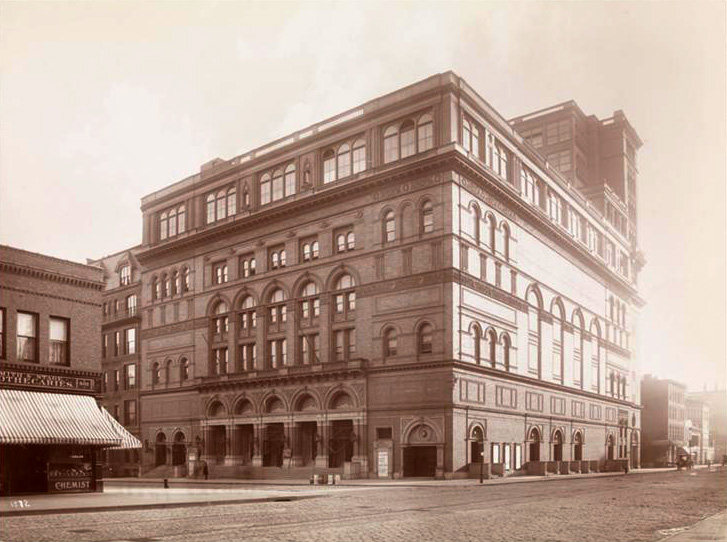
Carnegie Hall in the 1890s

- 1891
  - Carnegie Hall opens.
  - Gristedes grocery and Batten Company (advertising agency) in business.
- 1892
  - Washington Square Arch and Decker Building constructed.
  - Spence School, Patrolmen's Benevolent Association, and New York School of Applied Design for Women founded.
  - U.S. Immigrant Inspection Station begins operating on Ellis Island.
  - Vogue fashion magazine begins publication.
- 1893
  - August 24:1893 Hurricane wipes out Hog Island, causes a 30-foot storm surge, and kills at least 34.
  - December 16: Premiere of Dvořák's New World Symphony.
  - Municipal Art Society founded.

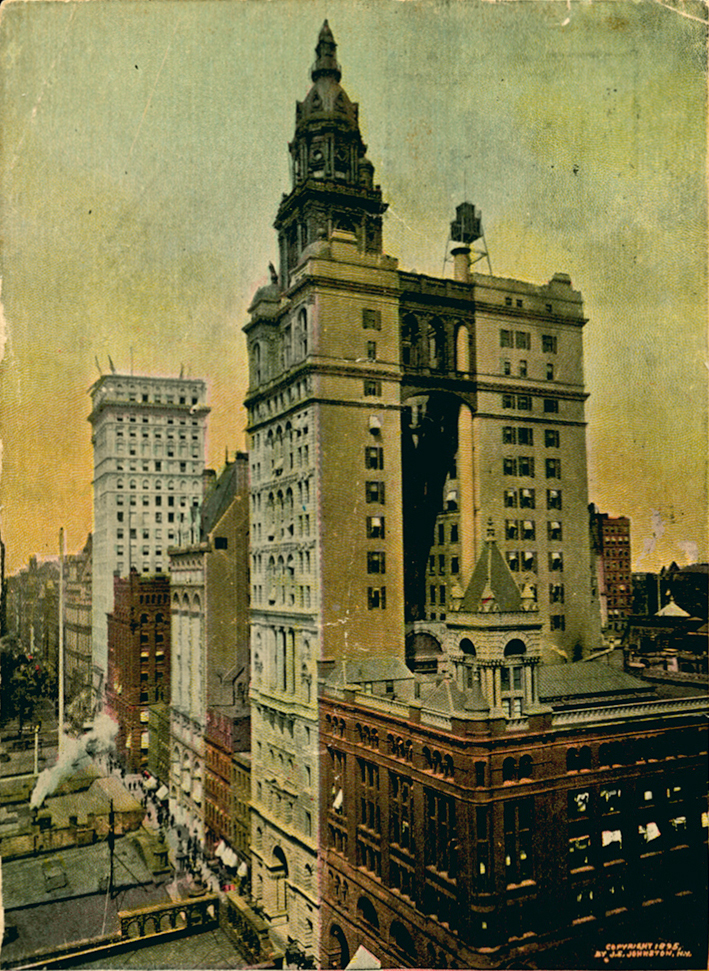
The Manhattan Life Insurance Company Building in 1895

- 1894
  - The Manhattan Life Insurance Company Building is completed, taking the lead as the tallest building in the city and becoming the first to ever pass 330 feet in height.
  - September 23: Veniero's Pasticceria in East Village opens
- 1895
  - New York Public Library established.
  - Sea Lion Park opens
- 1896
  - August 5–13: 1896 Eastern North America heat wave prostrates the city, with temperatures exceeding 90 °F for nine days both day and night, with stagnant air and oppressive humidity. In all, 420 people die, mostly in crowded tenements in areas such as the Lower East Side.
  - December 10: New York Aquarium opens in Castle Garden in Battery Park, the oldest continuously operated aquarium in the United States.
  - Cooper Union Museum for the Arts of Decoration, and City History Club established.
- 1897
  - February 10: Bradley-Martin Ball held.
  - April: Grant's Tomb completed.
  - September 21: Yes, Virginia, there is a Santa Claus newspaper editorial published.
  - Unknown: Steeplechase Park opens.
  - Bohemian National Hall built.
- 1898
  - January 1: City of Greater New York created, consolidating the existing City of New York with the eastern Bronx, Brooklyn, most of Queens County, and Staten Island.
  - January 1: Robert A. Van Wyck becomes mayor.
  - National Arts Club founded.

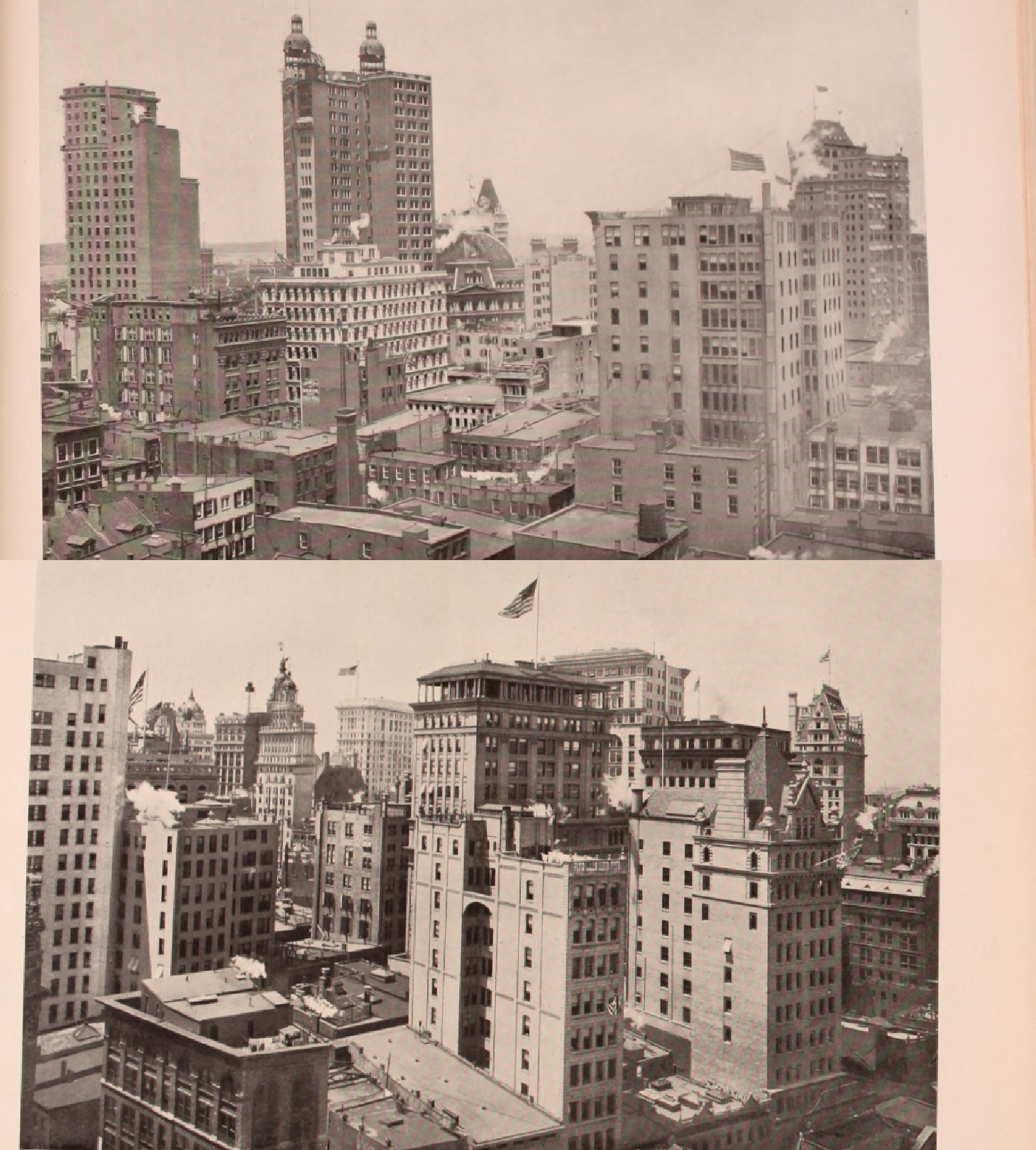
Lower Manhattan in the late 19th century

- 1899
  - July 18: The Newsboy Strike of 1899 started, advocating for child labor rights
  - July 20: The Park Row Building is completed, becoming the tallest in New York City, at 391 ft. (119 m.).
  - September 13: Henry H. Bliss becomes the first person killed in an automobile accident in the United States when he steps off a streetcar at West 74th Street and Central Park West and is struck by a taxicab.
  - November 8: The Bronx Zoo opens.

== 1900s ==
=== 1900s–1940s ===
==== 1900s ====
- 1900
  - International Ladies' Garment Workers' Union founded.
  - Spuyten Duyvil Bridge rebuilt.
  - Population: 3,437,202.
- 1901
  - Bergdorf Goodman (shop) in business.
  - Rockefeller Institute and Chapin School established.
  - National Negro Business League headquartered in city.
- 1902
  - January 8: A train collision in the original Park Avenue tunnel kills 17 and injures 38.
  - Macy's Herald Square and Algonquin Hotel in business.
  - Flatiron Building constructed.
  - Lina Rogers Struthers became the first school nurse in the United States.
- 1903
  - New York Highlanders baseball team active.
  - Williamsburg Bridge, New Amsterdam Theatre, and Lyric Theatre open.
  - Luna Park opens.
  - Sea Lion Park closes.
  - The Coney Island Polar Bear Club founded.

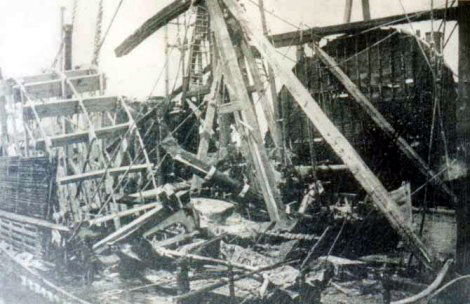
Wreck of the General Slocum, 1904

- 1904
  - June 15: Steamboat General Slocum, carrying 1300 to a picnic site on Long Island, catches fire and sinks while on the East River alongside Astoria, Queens. Over 1000 passengers are killed, a major factor in the demise of the Little Germany neighborhood.
  - New York City Subway begins operating.
  - IRT wildcat strike.
  - Stuyvesant High School and Hispanic Society of America established.
  - Dreamland opens.
- 1905
  - March 14: Fire swept through an overcrowded tenement at 105 Allen Street on the Lower East Side, killing at least twenty people and injuring numerous more.
  - Institute of Musical Art founded.
  - Columbus Circle laid out.
  - Ratner's restaurant in business.
  - 291 (art gallery) opens.
- 1906
  - June 25: Stanford White is shot and killed by Harry Kendall Thaw at what was then Madison Square Gardens. The murder would soon be dubbed "The Crime of the Century".
  - Hammerstein Ballroom opens.
  - DeWitt Clinton Park laid out.
  - Society for the Suppression of Unnecessary Noise established.
  - Mamma Leone's restaurant in business.
- 1907
  - December 31: Times Square Ball drop begins.
  - Plaza Hotel in business.
  - Japan Society founded.
  - Ziegfeld Follies active.
  - Alexander Hamilton U.S. Custom House and Audubon Terrace built.
- 1908 – Singer Building constructed.
- 1909
  - September/October: Hudson-Fulton Celebration of the 300th anniversary of Henry Hudson's discovery of the Hudson River and the 100th anniversary of Robert Fulton's first successful commercial application of the paddle steamer.
  - New York Amsterdam News begins publication.
  - Metropolitan Life Insurance Company Tower built.
  - International Women's Day held.

==== 1910s ====
- 1910
  - August 9, 1910 – Reformist Mayor William Jay Gaynor is shot in Hoboken, New Jersey by former city employee James Gallagher. He eventually dies in 1913.
  - Pennsylvania Station built, and the first method to traverse the Hudson River is completed.
  - Gimbels shop in business.

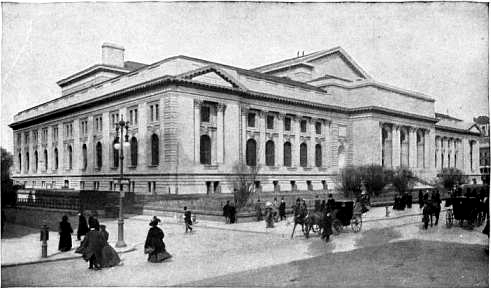
New York Public Library Main Branch in the 1910s

- 1911
  - March 25: 146 employees, mostly women, are killed in the Triangle Shirtwaist Factory fire near Washington Square Park, some by being forced to jump from the building by the fire.
  - July: 1911 Eastern North America heat wave.
  - New York Public Library Main Branch building constructed.
  - Negro Society for Historical Research established.
  - Winter Garden Theatre opens.
  - The Masses begins publication.
  - Gun control Sullivan Law takes effect in New York State.
  - Dreamland is destroyed in a fire.
- 1912
  - Columbia University Graduate School of Journalism established.
  - New York Call begins publication.
  - Heterodoxy (group) formed.
  - Citarella's market and Automat eatery in Times Square in business.
  - Aeolian Hall and Audubon Ballroom built.
  - 48th Street Theatre opens.
  - RMS Carpathia arrives with the 705 survivors of the sinking of the RMS Titanic, where 1517 people died.
- 1913
  - International Exhibition of Modern Art held.
  - Grand Central Terminal rebuilt.
  - Grand Central Oyster Bar and Prentice Hall publisher in business.
  - Vanity Fair magazine begins publication.
  - Federal Reserve Bank of New York established.
  - Woolworth Building built.
  - New York Highlanders changed their team's name to the New York Yankees.
  - June 2: The 15th New York Infantry Regiment, which later became the 369th Infantry Regiment ("Harlem Hellfighters") was constituted within the New York Army National Guard.
- 1914
  - January 1: The parts of New York County which had been annexed from Westchester County were newly constituted as the County of The Bronx.
  - July 4: Lexington Avenue bombing.
  - Woman's Peace Party of New York City organized.
  - Hunter College High School active.
  - Russ & Daughters food shop in business.
- 1915
  - January : Anti-Militarism Committee in response to World War I organized.
  - January 25: First transcontinental telephone call occurs (San Francisco-New York).
  - May 1: Ship Lusitania departs.
  - September 22: 25 are killed during construction of the IRT Broadway–Seventh Avenue Line in a collapse between 23rd and 25th Street.
  - Merrill, Lynch & Co. and Knopf publisher in business.
- 1916
  - October 16: Margaret Sanger opens her first birth control clinic in Brooklyn.
  - July 30: Black Tom explosion set off by German saboteurs at a munitions arsenal on a small island in New York Harbor kills seven in Jersey City, New Jersey and causes damage as far as the Brooklyn waterfront and Times Square.
  - 1916 Zoning Resolution.
  - Auto-Ordnance Corporation gun manufacturer in business.
- 1917
  - New York City Water Tunnel No. 1 begins operating.
  - McGraw-Hill Publishing Co. in business.
  - July 28: African Americans started the Silent Parade on Fifth Avenue as a protest against the East St. Louis riots.
  - August 30: Prior to its departing to training ahead of World War I, 27th Infantry Division participated in a large send-off parade in New York City along 5th Avenue.
- 1918
  - The "Great Influenza Pandemic" rages across the country and worldwide. On one particularly virulent October day, 851 people died in New York City alone.
  - November 1: The actions of a substitute motorman filling in during a strike lead to a subway crash in Flatbush. The Malbone Street Wreck kills 97 people heading home from work and injures a hundred more.
  - Okeh Records in business.
  - Selwyn Theatre opens.
- 1919
  - February: City records 30,000 deaths from the Spanish flu.
  - September 10: US Army 1st Division returns from war.
  - New School for Social Research founded.
  - Daily News begins publication.
  - Algonquin Round Table active.
  - 135th Street YMCA opens.

==== 1920s ====
- 1920
  - September 16: Wall Street bombing kills 38 at "the precise center, geographical as well as metaphorical, of financial America and even of the financial world". Anarchists were suspected (Sacco and Vanzetti had been indicted just days before) but no one was ever charged with the crime.
  - Apollo Theatre (42nd Street) opens.
  - Gotham Book Mart in business.
  - Population: 5,620,048.
- 1921
  - Port of New York Authority established.
  - Council on Foreign Relations headquartered in city.
  - May 3: First use of "Big Apple" as a nickname for the city appeared in a New York Morning Telegraph article by John J. Fitz Gerald.
  - October 1: 833 AM became the 1st radio broadcast station in the city to signed on the air, under the call letters WJZ (now WABC (AM) 770).
- 1922
  - February 22: WOR (AM) 833 (now 710) signed on the air for the first time.
  - March 2: WEAF 660 AM (now WFAN) signed on the air for the first time.
  - September: Straw Hat Riot.
  - Brooklyn Technical High School established.
  - Roseland Ballroom built.
- 1923
  - Museum of the City of New York incorporated.
  - Cotton Club (nightclub) and Barneys clothier in business.
  - Duke Ellington Orchestra active.
  - New York Yankees won their 1st World Series championship.
  - American Academy of Arts and Letters building and Mecca Temple constructed.
- 1924
  - February 12: Premiere of Gershwin's Rhapsody in Blue.
  - WNYC radio begins broadcasting.
  - Pierpont Morgan Library established.
  - New York Daily Mirror and New York Evening Graphic newspapers begin publication.
  - Saks Fifth Avenue shop and Simon & Schuster publisher in business.
  - Macy's Thanksgiving Day Parade begins.
  - September 20: 920 AM signed on the air for the first time, under the call letters WAHG (now WCBS (AM) 880).
- 1925
  - February 6: WMCA 570 AM signed on the air for the first time.
  - May: Air conditioning installed in the Rivoli cinema.
  - The New Yorker magazine begins publication.
  - Tannen's Magic Shop in business.
  - New York Giants football team (founded by original owner Tim Mara) was one of the five teams to join the NFL.
  - Population reaches 7,774,000, making New York City the largest in the world according to demographers Chandler & Fox. This role would be relinquished in 1965 to Tokyo.
- 1926
  - Savoy Ballroom and Paramount Theatre open.
  - Martha Graham Center of Contemporary Dance established.
  - The National Broadcasting Company (NBC) launched.
- 1927
  - June 26: Coney Island Cyclone rollercoaster begins operating.
  - November 13: Holland Tunnel for automobiles opens.
  - December 4: New York Giants won their 1st NFL championship, after finishing the season with the best record.
  - New York County Courthouse and Sherry Netherland Hotel built.
  - Roxy Theatre, and Ziegfeld Theatre open.
  - New York Yankees won their 2nd World Series championship, sweeping the Pittsburgh Pirates in 4 games.
  - Random House publisher, Strand Bookstore, Russian Tea Room, Caffe Reggio, and Sardi's restaurant in business.
- 1928
  - August 24: A subway crash caused by a defective switch below Times Square kills 18 and injures 100.
  - New York Yankees won their 3rd World Series championship.
- 1929
  - May 19: Two people were killed and scores injured in a stampede at Yankee Stadium by a crowd seeking to avoid a thunderstorm.
  - October: Wall Street Crash of 1929.
  - November: Museum of Modern Art opens.
  - Stork Club and 21 Club in business.
  - CBS radio broadcasting of Cotton Club performances begins.
  - The Great Depression.

==== 1930s ====
- 1930
  - March 6: 35,000 gather on International Unemployment Day and clash with police.
  - August 6: New York Supreme Court associate justice Joseph Force Crater disappears, last seen entering a taxicab. He was declared legally dead in 1939. His mistress Sally Lou Ritz (22) disappeared a few weeks later.
  - Chrysler Building constructed.
  - Carlyle Hotel in business.

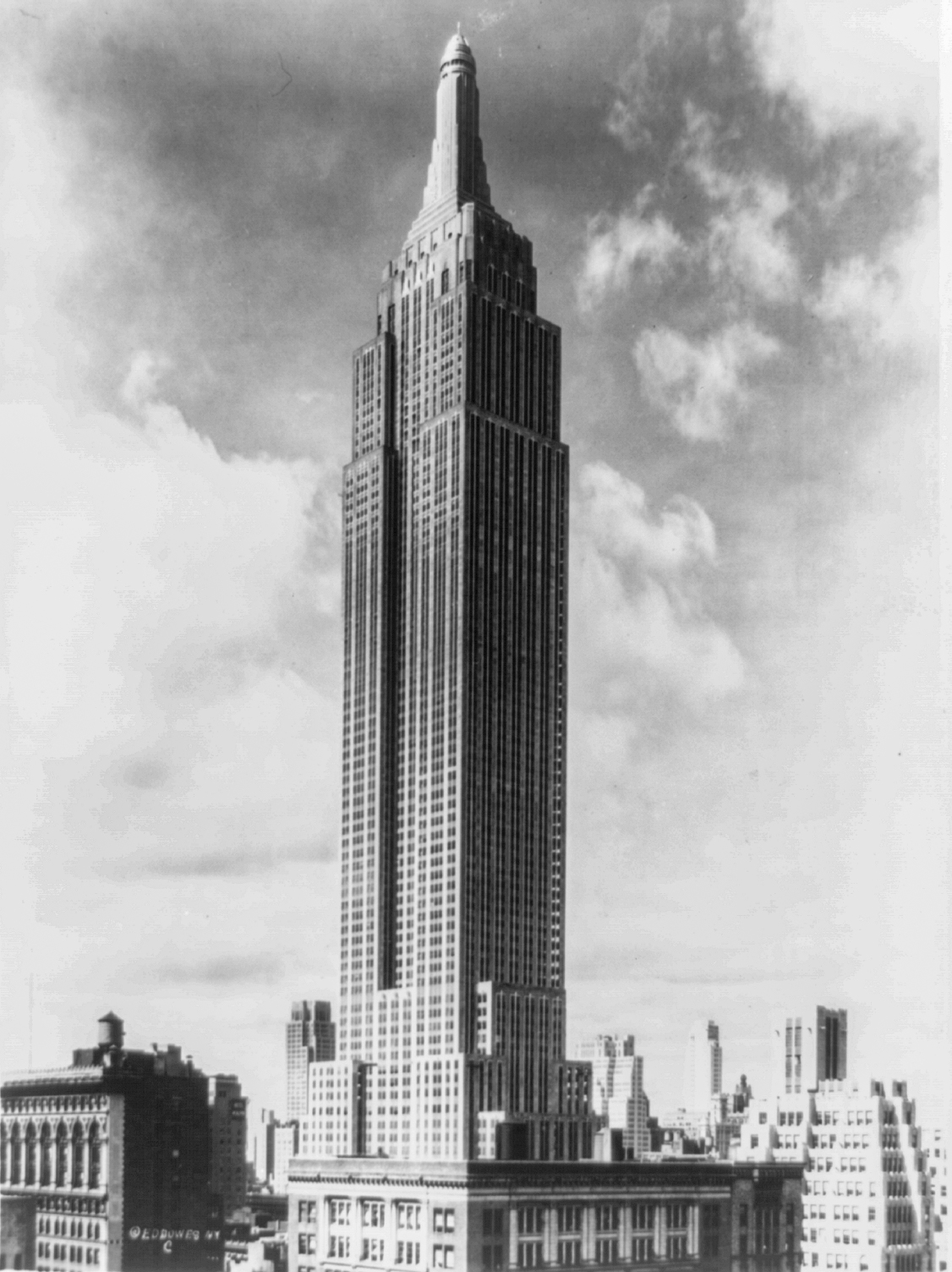
Empire State Building in the 1930s

- 1931
  - December: Bank of United States closes.
  - Empire State Building and Seamen's House YMCA built.
  - Whitney Museum of American Art and Group Theatre founded.
  - Metropolitan Opera radio broadcasts begin.
  - Waldorf-Astoria Hotel in business.
- 1932
  - Radio City Music Hall opens.
  - September 20: Lunch atop a Skyscraper photographed.
  - D'Agostino market opens.
  - New York Yankees won their 4th World Series championship.
- 1933
  - RCA Building constructed.
  - Fairway Market opens at Broadway and 74th Street.
  - Fiorello H. La Guardia is elected the first Italian American Mayor.
- 1934
  - Rainbow Room restaurant, Tavern on the Green, and Zabar's food retailer in business.
  - School of American Ballet founded.
  - Fiorello H. La Guardia becomes mayor.
  - December 9: New York Giants won their 2nd NFL championship, defeating the Chicago Bears 30–13.
- 1935
  - March 19: The arrest of a shoplifter inflames racial tensions in Harlem and escalates to rioting and looting, with three killed, 125 injured and 100 arrested.
  - New York Passenger Ship Terminal built.
  - Premiere of Gershwin's opera Porgy and Bess.
  - Frick Collection (museum) opens.
- 1936
  - July 11: Triborough Bridge opens.
  - New York City Water Tunnel No. 2 begins operating.
  - High School of Music & Art and Photo League established.
  - Goya Foods, the largest Hispanic food company in the US, is founded.
  - Ford Foundation headquartered in city.
  - New York Yankees won their 6th World Series championship, the 1st World Series Championship under the leadership of rookie player Joe DiMaggio.
- 1937
  - August 11: Heavy rains cause a tenement in New Brighton to collapse, killing 19.
  - Lincoln Tunnel opens.
  - New York Journal-American newspaper begins publication.
  - Carnegie Deli and Stage Deli in business.
  - New York Yankees won their 7th World Series championship.
  - 1937 New York City department store strikes.
  - New York City adopted single transferable voting for election of its city council. In use from 1937 until 1947. (see NY STV).

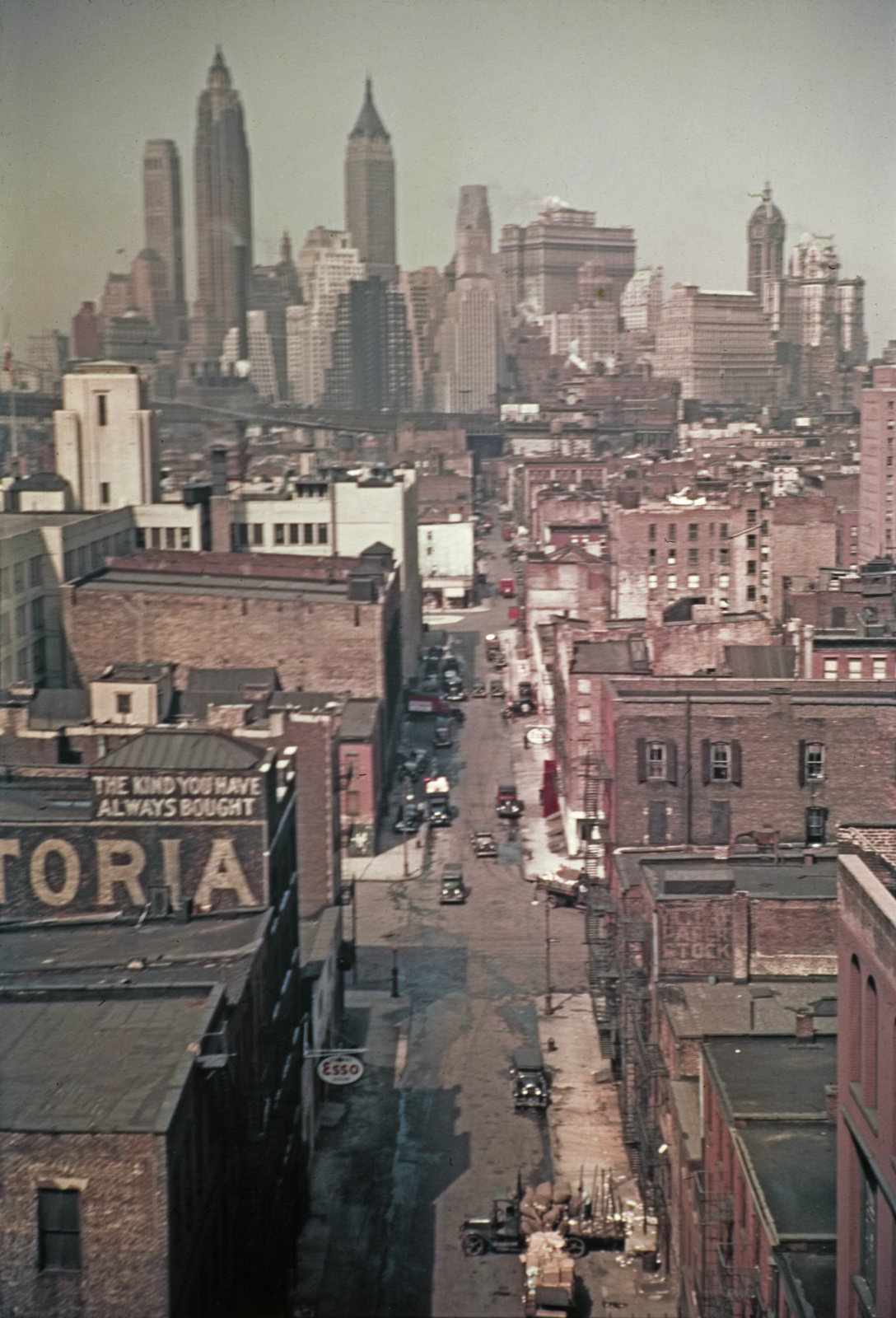
Manhattan skyline photographed using Agfacolor in 1938.

- 1938
  - January 16: Benny Goodman performs at Carnegie Hall.
  - May 28: The Carnival of Swing, considered to be the first outdoor jazz festival, takes place at Randall's Island.
  - August 26 Fire Fighter (fireboat) is launched as the world's most powerful fireboat.
  - September to December: The NYC Teamsters truckers strike shuts down the city.
  - September 21: New England Hurricane of 1938 strikes Long Island and continues into New England, killing 564. In New York City, ten people are killed and power is lost across upper Manhattan and the Bronx.
  - December 11: New York Giants won their 3rd NFL championship, defeated the Green Bay Packers, 23–17.
  - Bronx High School of Science and The Cloisters museum established.
  - New York Yankees became the 1st team in Major League Baseball history to win their 3rd straight World Series championship.
- 1939
  - April: 1939 New York World's Fair opens.
  - July: 1st World Science Fiction Convention held.
  - July 4: New York Yankees celebrating Lou Gehrig appreciation day. That day, Gehrig (who was diagnosed with ALS) spoke in his farewell address by saying: "... today, I considered myself, the luckiest man on the face of the earth."
  - October 8: New York Yankees won their 4th consecutive World Series title, and their 8th in franchise history, by sweeping the Cincinnati Reds in 4 games.
  - Rockefeller Center built.
  - New York Municipal Airport opens.
  - American Ballet Theatre active.
  - Meeker Avenue Bridge opens.

==== 1940s ====
- 1940
  - November 16: "Mad Bomber" George Metesky plants the first bomb of his 16-year campaign of public bombings.
  - American Negro Theater founded.
  - Population: 7,454,995. White non-Hispanic population peaks at 6,856,586 or 92% of the total.
- 1941
  - The first two television stations in the city signed on the air for the first time. The first was WNBT Channel 1 (now WNBC Channel 4), to signed on the air. And the second was WCBW (now WCBS-TV) Channel 2, to signed on the air.
  - October 6: New York Yankees won their 9th World Series championship.
  - Le Pavillon restaurant in business.
- 1942
  - Art of This Century gallery opens.
  - Burning and capsizing of the French transatlantic ocean liner the SS Normandie in Pier 88.
  - New York at War military parade.
- 1943
  - July: Józef Piłsudski Institute of America founded.
  - August 1: Race riot erupts in Harlem after an African-American soldier is shot by the police and rumored to be killed. The incident touches off a simmering brew of racial tension, unemployment, and high prices to a day of rioting and looting. Several looters are shot dead, with blood everywhere, and about 500 persons are injured and another 500 arrested.
  - New York City Opera company founded.
  - New York Fashion Week begins.
- 1944
  - Fashion Institute of Technology established.
  - May 2: WABD Channel 4 (now WNYW Channel 5) became the 3rd television station in the city to signed on the air for the first time.
  - Luna Park closes, after a fire.
- 1945
  - July 28: A B-25 Mitchell bomber accidentally crashes into the 79th floor of the Empire State Building, killing 13 people.
  - August 14: Victory over Japan Day celebrated in Times Square with famous kiss photograph taken by Alfred Eisenstaedt.
  - December 17: WABD moved from Channel 4 to Channel 5.
  - Adam Clayton Powell Jr. becomes U.S. representative for New York's 22nd congressional district.
- 1946
  - January 12: New York City Victory Parade of 1946.
  - May 20: a United States Army Air Forces C-45 Beechcraft airplane crashed into the 58th floor on the north side of 40 Wall Street killing 5.
  - June 25: Fire destroys the St. George terminal of the Staten Island Ferry, killing 3 and injuring 280.
  - November 1: Channel 2 changed its call letters from WCBW to WCBS-TV.
  - Living Theatre founded.
  - Balducci's grocery in business.
- 1947
  - Jackie Robinson of the Brooklyn Dodgers crosses the baseball color line.
  - Over six million New Yorkers are vaccinated in order to end the 1947 New York City smallpox outbreak.
  - Actors Studio founded.
  - Premiere of Williams' play A Streetcar Named Desire.
  - December 25: Blizzard of 1947 shuts down city and kills 77.
- 1948
  - May 4: 95.5 FM signs on the air for the first time, under the call sign WJZ-FM (now WPLJ).
  - June 15: WPIX Channel 11 became the 5th television station in the city to signed on the air for the first time.
  - First tenants move into Stuyvesant Town–Peter Cooper Village, then the largest apartment complex in Manhattan.
  - August 10: Channel 7 signed on the air for the first time, as WJZ-TV (now WABC-TV).
  - New York City Ballet is founded.
  - The Ed Sullivan Show (television programme) begins broadcasting.
  - New York International Airport dedicated.
  - Korvettes department store in business.
  - Premiere of Cole Porter's musical Kiss Me, Kate.
  - Paris cinema opens.
  - 98.7 FM facility station signs on for the first time, as WOR-FM (now WEPN-FM).
- 1949
  - February 10: Premiere of Miller's play Death of a Salesman.
  - May 13: Holland Tunnel fire caused by exploding truck carrying eighty 55-gallon drums of carbon disulfide seriously damages the tunnel's infrastructure and injures 66, with 27 hospitalized, mostly from smoke inhalation.
  - October 9: New York Yankees won 12th World Series title, defeating the Brooklyn Dodgers in five games.
  - October 11: Channel 9 became the last VHF station in the city to sign on the air as WOR-TV (now WWOR-TV).
  - Birdland (jazz club) in business.
  - School of Visual Arts established.

=== 1950s–1970s ===
==== 1950s ====
- 1950
  - May 25: Brooklyn-Battery Tunnel opens.
  - August 31: William O'Dwyer resigned from office as mayor, because of the city's police corruption scandal; Vincent R. Impellitteri appointed acting mayor.
  - November: Impellitteri elected 101st mayor, the first since the consolidation of greater New York in 1898.
  - November 22: Kew Gardens train crash kills 78 people, injuring 363 others.
  - December 15: Port Authority Bus Terminal opens.
- 1951
  - March 29: A bomb that exploded in Grand Central Terminal, injuring no one, marked the end of self-imposed hiatus of George Metesky, a.k.a. the "Mad Bomber". In 1951 alone he had five bombs explode at New York City landmarks, such as the New York Public Library Main Branch.
  - October 3: New York Giants won the NL Pennant, with a famous walk-off home run by Bobby Thomson, which was called the hit the Shot Heard 'Round the World (baseball).
  - October 10: New York Yankees won their third consecutive World Series title, and 14th overall in franchise history, defeated the New York Giants in six games.
  - New York State law takes over from World War II era Federal laws regarding Rent control. At the time over two million rental units are impacted.
- 1952
  - United Nations Headquarters and Pier 57 built.
  - October 7: New York Yankees tied the record, winning their fourth straight World Series championship, and 15th overall in franchise history, by defeating the Brooklyn Dodgers in 7 games.
- 1953
  - October 5: New York Yankees won a record fifth consecutive World Series championship, and 16th overall in franchise history.
  - Hulan Jack elected Manhattan borough president.
- 1954
  - January 1: Robert F. Wagner Jr. became the city's 102nd mayor.
  - January: Arthur C. Ford becomes the first African American to be appointed commissioner of a New York City agency.
  - Shakespeare in the Park begins.
  - Veselka diner, Second Avenue Deli, and Fairway Market in business.
- 1955
  - The Village Voice newspaper begins publication.
  - Sotheby's branch office in business.
- 1956
  - Sbarro opens the first store Bensonhurst, Brooklyn.
- 1957
  - January 21: George Metesky, a.k.a. the "Mad Bomber" is arrested in his Waterbury, Connecticut home.
  - February 1: Northeast Airlines Flight 823 crashes on Rikers Island on takeoff from LaGuardia Airport, killing 20 of the 101 on board.
  - September 26: Premiere of musical West Side Story.
  - Bronx Community College established.
  - New York is left with only one MLB team with the departure of the Giants and the Dodgers.
- 1958
  - Puerto Rican Day Parade begins.
  - Alvin Ailey American Dance Theater company formed.
  - Seagram Building constructed.
  - August 12: Great Day in Harlem musicians' portrait photographed.
- 1959
  - February 3: American Airlines Flight 320 crashes in the East River on approach to LaGuardia Airport, killing 65 of the 73 people on board.
  - Guggenheim Museum building opens.
  - Cafe Wha? and The Four Seasons Restaurant in business.
  - Lincoln Center for the Performing Arts construction begins.
  - Premiere of play A Raisin in the Sun.

==== 1960s ====
- 1960
  - October 2: The "Sunday Bomber" began placing and detonating bombs on successive Sundays from October 2 through November 6, injuring dozens, killing a young teenager, and involving over 600 NYPD officers.
  - December 16: Mid-air collision between TWA Flight 266 (inbound to Idlewild Airport, now JFK) and United Airlines Flight 826 (inbound to LaGuardia Airport) over Miller Field, Staten Island. The TWA aircraft crashed at the site, killing all aboard, while the United aircraft continued flying for about eight miles until it crashed in the Park Slope section of Brooklyn, narrowly missing a school. All 128 aboard both aircraft died, along with six persons on the ground in Brooklyn.
  - Bleecker Street Cinema active.
  - Sister city relationship established with Tokyo, Japan.
  - Population: 7,781,984.
- 1961
  - 1961 NYC Zoning Resolution implemented.
  - City University of New York and La MaMa Experimental Theatre Club established.
  - New York Yankees won their 19th World Series title.
  - Lutèce (restaurant) in business.
  - Italian Cultural Institute in New York founded.
- 1962
  - March 1: American Airlines Flight 1 crashes immediately after takeoff from Idlewild Airport, killing all 95 on board.
  - May 28: Eero Saarinen's award-winning TWA Flight Center opens at JFK.
  - October 3: 23 are killed and 94 injured when an improperly maintained and operated steam boiler explodes and rips through a New York Telephone Company building cafeteria at lunchtime in the Inwood section of Manhattan.
  - November 30: Eastern Air Lines Flight 512 crashes when trying to make a go-round after failing to land at Idlewild Airport in the fog. 25 of the 51 on board are killed.
  - December 8: 1962–63 New York City newspaper strike begins.
  - December 11: Board of Estimate votes unanimously to reject Robert Moses's proposal to build a Lower Manhattan Expressway which would have cut through from the Williamsburg Bridge to the Holland Tunnel and dramatically changed Soho and Little Italy.
  - Philharmonic Hall and Delacorte Theater open.
  - Sylvia's Restaurant of Harlem in business.
  - New York Yankees won their 20th World Series title.
  - Andy Warhol opens his first Factory.
  - New York Mets baseball team, and Centro Civico Cultural Dominicano founded.
- 1963
  - January: The revised (1963) New York City Charter creates community boards within each borough.
  - New York City Department of City Planning votes to demolish critically acclaimed Beaux-Arts style Pennsylvania Station.
  - March 7: MetLife Building opens as PanAm Building.
  - April 20: Three brush fires on Staten Island destroy 100 homes.
  - August 28: The Career Girls Murders.
  - New York Film Festival begins.
  - American Folk Art Museum opens.
  - Elaine's restaurant and New York Hilton hotel in business.
  - The New York Review of Books begins publication.
- 1964
  - February: Public school boycott.
  - March 13: Kitty Genovese murdered.
  - April: 1964 New York World's Fair opens.
  - May 16: Antiwar protesters burn draft cards.
  - July 18: Riots break out in Harlem in protest over the killing of a 15-year-old by a white NYPD officer. One person is killed and 100 are injured in the violence.
  - November 21: Verrazzano–Narrows Bridge between Brooklyn and Staten Island opens. Bridge at the time is the longest in the world.
  - Center for Migration Studies of New York established.
  - New York State Theater and Shea Stadium open.
  - Pennsylvania Station rebuilt.
  - Staten Island wins the Little League World Series.
  - Steeplechase Park closes.
- 1965
  - February 8: Eastern Air Lines Flight 663 crashes at Jones Beach when after takeoff from JFK it is forced to evade inbound PanAm Flight 212. All 84 on board are killed.
  - February 21: Black nationalist leader Malcolm X is assassinated at the Audubon Ballroom by three members of the Nation of Islam.
  - August 15: The Beatles perform at Shea Stadium.
  - October: Pope Paul VI arrives as the first Catholic pope to ever visit the U.S. and gives his "war never again" speech against U.S. involvement in Vietnam.
  - November 9: New York City is affected as part of the Northeast Blackout of 1965.
  - The Velvet Underground musical group formed.
  - WINS (AM) 1010 changed its format from standard pop to all news.
  - Max's Kansas City nightclub and Oscar de la Renta in business.
  - New York City Landmarks Preservation Commission and Chelsea Theater Center established.
- 1966
  - January 1: New York City Transit workers strike for 12 days following failed contract negotiations between TWU Local 100 and the MTA.
  - January 1: John Lindsay sworn in as the 103rd mayor.
  - October 17: A fire across 23rd Street from Madison Square kills 12 members of the New York City Fire Department when a floor collapses beneath them. It was the worst day in the FDNY's history until September 11, 2001.
  - November 28: Black and White Ball held.
- 1967
  - October 8: James "Groovy" Hutchinson, 21, an East Village hippie/stoner, and Linda Fitzpatrick, 18, a newly converted flower child from a wealthy Greenwich, Connecticut family, are found bludgeoned to death at 169 Avenue B, an incident dubbed "The Groovy Murders" by the press. Two drifters later pleaded guilty to the murders.
  - Public Theater and Paley Park open.
  - South Street Seaport Museum founded.
  - Premiere of musical Hair.
- 1968
  - June 3: Valerie Solanas shoots Andy Warhol.
  - July 3: Man opens fire in Central Park, killing a 24-year-old woman and an 80-year-old man before being gunned down by police.
  - New York magazine begins publication.
  - Madison Square Garden (arena) and Performing Garage open.
  - Studio Museum in Harlem and Liberty Plaza Park established.
  - Ford Foundation Building constructed.
  - Columbia University protests of 1968.
  - New York City teachers' strike of 1968.
  - Singer Building demolished. Tallest structure ever destroyed until the World Trade Center is destroyed on September 11, 2001.
- 1969
  - January 12: Jets win their only Super Bowl Championship, beating the Baltimore Colts.
  - February 10: Nor'easter kills 14 and injures 68. Dubbed the "Lindsay Snowstorm", outer borough residents (especially in Queens) accuse the city of favoring Manhattan for snow removal (streets in Queens were not cleared a week after the storm). Lindsay subsequently loses the Republican primary for re-election.
  - June 28: A questionable police raid on the Stonewall Inn, a Greenwich Village gay bar, is resisted by the patrons and leads to a riot. The event helps inspire the founding of the modern homosexual rights movement.
  - November 10: Sesame Street children's television program begins broadcasting.
  - The York Theatre Company founded.
  - El Museo del Barrio founded.
  - Dance Theatre of Harlem founded.
  - Javits Federal Building and Gulf and Western building constructed.
  - Interview magazine begins publication.
  - October 16: New York Mets win their first World Series title, defeating the Baltimore Orioles in five games.

==== 1970s ====
- 1970
  - March 6: Greenwich Village townhouse explosion.
  - May 8: Hard Hat Riot.
  - First New York City Marathon run - now largest in the world.
  - LGBT Pride March begins.
  - New York Knicks won their 1st NBA championship.
  - Film Forum, Anthology Film Archives, and International Peace Academy established.
  - Knapp Commission begins its investigation of police corruption.
- 1971
  - May 21: NYCPD officers, Waverly Jones and Joseph Piagentini, were murdered by members of the Black Liberation Army in Harlem. The gunmen, Herman Bell and Anthony Bottom, still in prison as of 2017, were rearrested in jail in connection with the 1971 killing of a San Francisco police officer. This case was made into a true crime novel "Badge of the Assassin" in 1979 by Robert Tanenbaum which was a CBS TV movie in 1985. Bottom was released in 2020.
  - Bella Abzug becomes U.S. representative for New York's 19th congressional district; Charles B. Rangel becomes U.S. representative for New York's 18th congressional district.
  - The Office of the Special Narcotics Prosecutor for the City of New York is created to handle drugs related crimes.
- 1972
  - January 27: NYCPD officers Gregory Foster and Rocco Laurie are murdered on duty by men who claimed membership in the Black Liberation Army, similar to the previous year's murders of officers Waverly Jones and Joseph Piagentini in terms of their murderers claiming Black Liberation Army ties and was made into another true crime novel (1974 by Al Silverman) and CBS made-for-television movie in 1975. Unlike Officers Jones' and Piagentini's murders, Foster's and Laurie's are unsolved although one of its suspects, Robert Vickers, was sentenced in 2016 to 21 years for an unrelated crime-selling drugs to an undercover Albany detective.
  - March 15: The Godfather movie about a fictional New York City Italian-American crime family, premieres at the Loew's Theatre.
  - April 7: Mobster Joe Gallo was shot at Umberto's Clam House in Little Italy. The incident served as the inspiration for the Bob Dylan's epic "Joey" recorded in 1975.
  - August 22: John Wojtowicz and Salvatore Naturale held up a Brooklyn bank for 14 hours for cash to pay for Wojtowicz's wife's sex change operation. The scheme failed when the police arrived, leading to a tense 14-hour standoff. Natuarale was killed by the police at JFK Airport. The incident served as the basis for the 1975 film Dog Day Afternoon.
  - Queens Museum of Art founded.
  - Quad Cinema and H&H Bagels in business.
  - Abuses at Willowbrook State School on Staten Island exposed by Geraldo Rivera leads to its ultimate closure.
- 1973
  - Kiss forms as the first rock, ex. heavy metal band who wore kabuki makeup.
  - February 10: 40 workers are killed in an explosion while cleaning an empty LNG tank in Bloomfield, Staten Island.
  - March 3: The 102-year-old Broadway Central Hotel at 673 Broadway collapsed, killing four residents.
  - April 4: World Trade Center towers built.
  - August 11: DJ Kool Herc hosts party at 1520 Sedgwick Avenue, utilizing two turntables and scratching the records to create new music, Hip-Hop is born.
  - Co-op City, the largest cooperative apartment complex in the world, opened.
  - B&H Photo shop, CBGB music club, Gray's Papaya, and Times Square TKTS booth in business.
  - New York Knicks won their 2nd NBA championship.
  - Salsa music arises (approximate date).
  - Nuyorican Poets Café active (approximate date).
- 1974
  - Punk rockers The Ramones form.
  - August 7: Petit's highwire stunt performed atop World Trade Center.
  - Abe Beame becomes the city's first Jewish mayor.
  - Village Halloween Parade began.
  - International Center of Photography founded.
  - W. R. Grace Building constructed.
  - Bayview Correctional Facility in operation.
- 1975
  - January 24: Fraunces Tavern, a historical site in lower Manhattan, was bombed by the FALN killing 4 people and wounding more than 50.
  - June 24: Eastern Air Lines Flight 66 from New Orleans strikes the runway lights at Kennedy airport, probably due to wind shear. 113 of the 124 people on board are killed.
  - October 30: "Ford to City: Drop Dead" news headline published in the Daily News after President Gerald Ford states he would veto any federal bailout of the city.
  - December 29: A bomb explodes in the baggage claim area of the TWA terminal at LaGuardia Airport, killing 11 and injuring 74. The perpetrators were never identified.
  - City fiscal crisis.
  - Museum of Broadcasting founded.
  - Talking Heads musical group formed.
- 1976
  - July 4: Bicentennial celebration involves review of 16 tall ships as part of Operation Sail.
  - July 12–15: The 1976 Democratic National Convention was held at Madison Square Garden in Midtown Manhattan.
  - July 29: David Berkowitz (aka the "Son of Sam") kills one person and seriously wounds another in the first of a series of attacks that terrorized the city for the next year.
  - October 10: Giants NFL team ceases playing in the city and plays its first game in the Meadowlands at the new Giants Stadium.
  - November 25: NYPD officer Robert Torsney fatally shoots unarmed 15-year-old Randolph Evans in Cypress Hills, Brooklyn. Torsney is found not guilty by reason of insanity the following year and is released from Queens' Creedmoor Psychiatric Center in 1979, only to be placed under many rules and restrictions and denied a disability pension.
  - Cooper-Hewitt Museum of Design opens.
  - Mortimer's restaurant in business.
  - New York City Department of Parks and Recreation formed.
  - Battery Park City is created on land reclaimed from the Hudson River with 3 million cubic yards of soil and rock excavated from numerous locations throughout the city.
- 1977
  - February 18: Hometowners Kiss plays their first Madison Square Garden show, the first of what would be six such shows during that decade (three more were in Dec. 1977, all of these 1977 "Garden shows" were sold outs and two more afterwards in July 1979).
  - April 21: City premiere of musical Annie.
  - April 26: Grand opening in Manhattan of Studio 54.
  - May 16: A New York Airways helicopter idling at the helipad on the MetLife Building – then the PanAm Building – toppled over and its rotor blade sheared off. The blade killed four people on the roof and then fell over the edge and down 59 stories and a block over to Madison Avenue where it killed a pedestrian.
  - May 25: A fire at the Everard Baths at 28 West 28th Street in Manhattan killed 9 patrons.
  - July 13–14: New York City again loses electrical power in the blackout of 1977. Unlike the previous blackout twelve years earlier, this blackout is followed by widespread rioting and looting. Many neighborhoods, most notably Bushwick, were almost completely devastated.
  - August 10: David Berkowitz, the city's "son of Sam" serial killer, is captured outside his Yonkers apartment and brought back to the city for indictment and detention.
  - October 12: "Ladies and gentlemen, the Bronx is burning." During Game 2 of the 1977 World Series between the New York Yankees and the Los Angeles Dodgers, a fire rages out of control at an abandoned elementary school near Yankee Stadium. The images and a dramatic statement on national television by sportscaster Howard Cosell is widely seen as the symbolic nadir of a dark period in city history. The story of 1977 in New York City is later featured in such works as the film Summer of Sam by Spike Lee, the best-selling book Ladies and Gentlemen, The Bronx Is Burning, and the television drama The Bronx is Burning.
  - October 12: CitiCorp Center opens.
  - Drawing Center established.
  - Mainstream prominence of disco music confirmed with December 14 release of Saturday Night Fever (set in the Italian-American community of Brooklyn). Also that evening, city formed heavy metalers Kiss plays the first of their three night return gigs through the 16th at Madison Square Garden, all sold outs like their first such "Garden gig" that February 18.
  - Dean & DeLuca food shop, Big Apple Circus, Smith & Wollensky restaurant, and Christie's branch office in business.
  - I ♥ NY advertising campaign begins.
  - New York Yankees won their 21st World Series championship.
- 1978
  - January 1: Ed Koch becomes the 105th mayor.
  - January 9: New newspaper – The Trib.
  - May ? David Berkowitz is sentenced to multiple 25 years-life terms for his 1976-1977 "Son of Sam" serial murders.
  - July 28: Woman gives birth at top of Empire State Building.
  - August–November: Multi-union strikes of the city's three major newspapers: The New York Times, New York Daily News and New York Post.
  - October 12: Rocker Sid Vicious allegedly stabs his girlfriend Nancy Spungen to death in their room in the Hotel Chelsea.
  - New York Yankees won their 22nd World Series championship.
  - December 14 City native Billy Joel plays the first of his first four Madison Square Garden shows; the other three on Dec. 15, 16 and 18.
- 1979
  - February 13: The Guardian Angels are formed in Brooklyn by Curtis Sliwa.
  - May 25: Six-year-old Etan Patz vanishes after leaving his SoHo apartment to walk to his school bus alone. Despite a massive search by the NYPD the boy is never found, and was declared legally dead in 2001.
  - July 24–25 City's metallers Kiss return to Madison Square Garden, but this time to much thinner audiences than their four sold out 1977 shows.
  - September 16: Sugar Hill Gang releases "Rapper's Delight", introducing Hip hop to the country and the world.
  - October 2–3: Pope John Paul II visits city, gives speech at U.N. against all concentration camps and tortures in light of the then 40th anniversary of World War II's first establishing of both in his native Poland by Nazi Germany and the Soviet Union and continuation afterwards by post-war Polish Communists.
  - New York Theatre Workshop founded.
  - Geraldine Ferraro becomes U.S. representative for New York's 9th congressional district.
  - New York Yankees come from behind to beat the Baltimore Orioles, 5–4, on a day when they buried their team captain Thurman Munson, with a game-winning 2-run hit by Bobby Murcer.
  - November 13: Ronald Reagan announces his candidacy for next year's presidential election.
  - Performance Space 122 opens.
  - Fulton John Sheen, aka Fulton Sheen, American Catholic bishop and television and radio broadcasting personality, dies at 84.

=== 1980s–1990s ===
==== 1980s ====
- 1980
  - March 14: Ex-Congressman Allard Lowenstein is assassinated in his law offices at Rockefeller Center by Dennis Sweeney, a deranged ex-associate.
  - April 1–11: Second New York City Transit strike lasts 11 days.
  - August 11–14: The 1980 Democratic National Convention was held at Madison Square Garden in Midtown Manhattan.
  - September 25: The Grand Hyatt Hotel, on the site of the former Commodore Hotel near Grand Central Terminal, is opened, representing the first completed real estate project of Donald Trump.
  - December 3: Staten Island Congressman John Murphy was convicted of bribery in the Abscam bribery scam which convicted seven Congressmen.
  - December 8: Ex-Beatle John Lennon is murdered in front of his home in the Dakota.
  - December: Transit Authority grounded its fleet of Grumman Flxible buses due to cracks in their A-frames. TA rents 150 old buses from Washington Metro.
  - ABC No Rio social centre founded.
  - The Wooster Group (theatre troupe) active.
  - Non-Hispanic white population totals 3,668,945, down over 3 million from 1940 and representing only 51.9% of total population.
  - Sister city relationship established with Beijing, China.
- 1981
  - May 6: Staten Island Ferry American Legion II crashes into a Norwegian freighter during the AM rush hour; 71 passengers injured.
  - July 3: First article about "rare cancer seen in homosexuals" (AIDS) appears in The New York Times.
  - AIDS is reported from here, with the city as #1 in descending order of U.S. cases of this disease (San Francisco #2 and Los Angeles #3).
  - Run–D.M.C., Sonic Youth, and Beastie Boys musical groups formed.
  - Helmsley Palace Hotel in business.
- 1982
  - January 1: Ed Koch is sworn into his second term as the city's 105th mayor.
  - March 20: Frances Schreuder, ~nee Bradshaw, is arrested in her Manhattan townhouse at 10 Gracie Square for 1978's Franklin Bradshaw murder of her multi-millionaire father that she forced her 17-year-old son, Marc, into committing out of fears of her disinheritance from Franklin's will.
  - June 22: Willie Turks, an African American 34-year-old MTA worker, is set upon and killed by a white mob in the Gravesend section of Brooklyn.
  - October 7: Cats premieres on Broadway and subsequently holds the record for longest running Broadway show from 1997 to 2006.
  - Institute for Puerto Rican Policy headquartered in New York City.
  - Intrepid Sea, Air & Space Museum opens.
  - Late Night with David Letterman television programme begins broadcasting.
  - Sister city relationships established with Cairo, Egypt, and Madrid, Spain.
- 1983
  - Brooklyn Bridge's centenary
  - April 15: New York Post under new owner Rupert Murdoch issues famous headline "Headless Body in Topless Bar"
  - September 15: Michael Stewart is allegedly beaten into a coma by New York Transit Police officers. Stewart died 13 days later from his injuries at Bellevue Hospital. On November 24, 1985, after a six-month trial, six officers were acquitted on charges stemming from Stewart's death.
  - October 6: Terence Cooke, Catholic archbishop of New York, dies at 62.
  - November: Limelight nightclub opens
  - December 10: The Jets play the last NFL game in New York City at Shea Stadium. They subsequently move to Giants Stadium in New Jersey.
  - Def Jam Recordings in business.
  - Lesbian & Gay Community Services Center incorporated.
  - Coney Island Mermaid Parade begins.
  - Sister city relationship established with Santo Domingo, Dominican Republic.

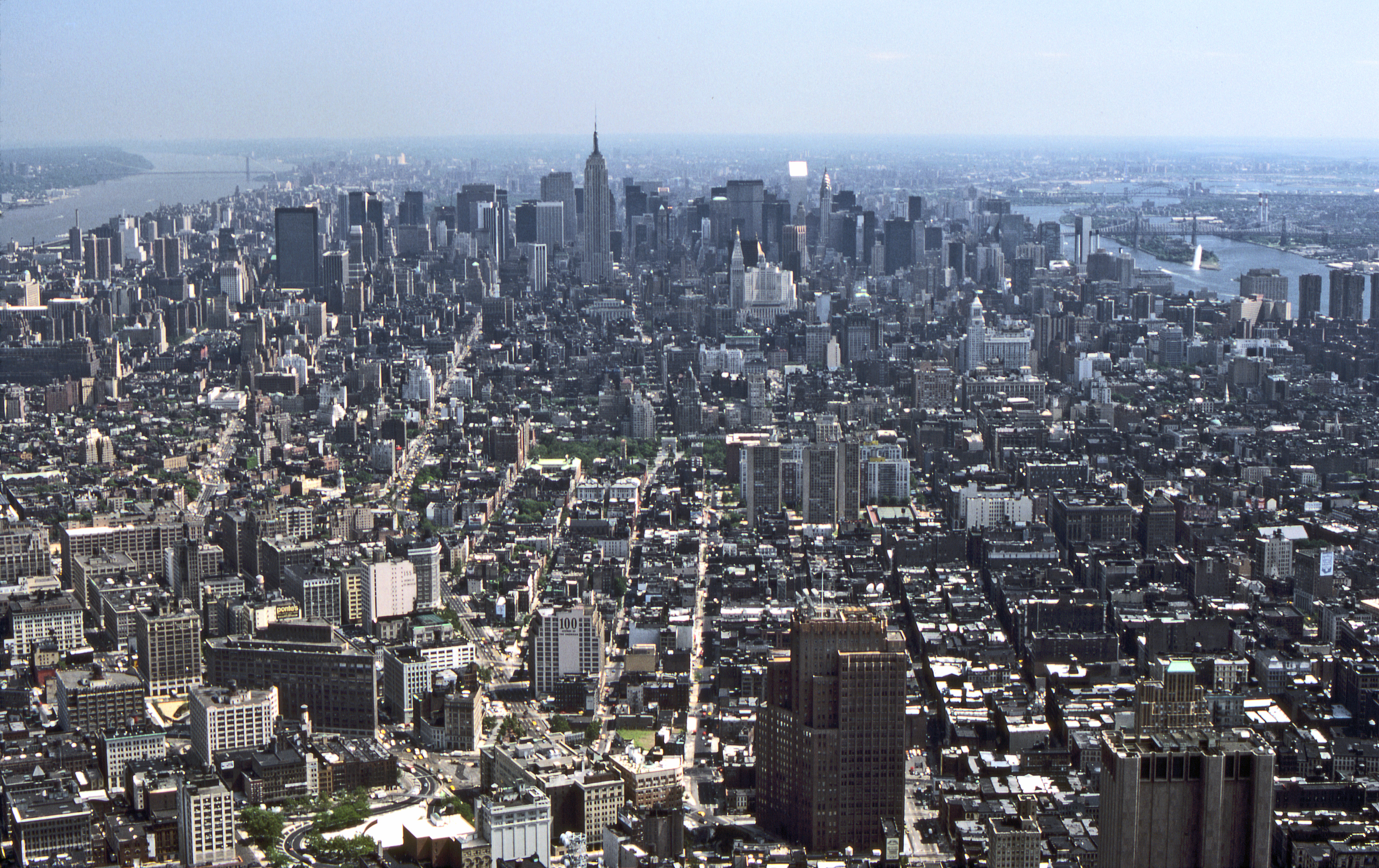
Midtown New York City seen from 2 World Trade Center in 1984

- 1984
  - April 15: Palm Sunday massacre – Christopher Thomas, 34, murders two women and 8 children at 1080 Liberty Avenue in the East New York section of Brooklyn.
  - June 23–29: Billy Joel performed seven live shows at Madison Square Garden, in the second North American leg of his An Innocent Man Tour.
  - October 29: 66-year-old Eleanor Bumpurs is shot and killed by police as they tried to evict her from her Bronx apartment. Bumpurs, who was mentally ill, was wielding a knife and had slashed one of the officers. The shooting provoked heated debate about police racism and brutality. In 1987 officer Stephen Sullivan was acquitted on charges of manslaughter and criminally negligent homicide stemming from the shooting.
  - December 22: Bernhard Goetz shoots and wounds four unarmed black men on a 2 train on the subway who tried to rob him, generating weeks of headlines and many discussions about crime and vigilantism in the media.
  - New York Center for Independent Publishing founded.
  - Philip Johnson's 550 Madison Avenue is completed.
  - Paper magazine begins publication.
  - Wigstock begins.
  - Fictional Cosby Show (television program) begins broadcasting.
- 1985
  - June 12: Edmund Perry, returning graduate of Phillips Exeter Academy in Exeter, New Hampshire, is shot to death in Harlem by undercover officer Lee Van Houten after Perry and his brother, Jonah, attacked Van Houten to get money for a film. Van Houten was acquitted the following month.
  - September 27: Hurricane Gloria made landfall with a broad of poorly defined center right passed John F. Kennedy International Airport in Jamaica, Queens.
  - November 5: Ed Koch is elected to a third and final term as mayor by a landmark margin, this time defeating New York City Council President Carol Bellamy.
  - December 16: Gambino crime family boss Paul Castellano is shot dead in a gangland execution outside Sparks Steak House on E. 46th Street in Manhattan.
  - Palladium nightclub and Union Square Cafe in business.
  - Poets House established.
  - Artworld Guerilla Girls pranksters active.
- 1986
  - Statue of Liberty's centenary.
  - January 1: Ed Koch is sworn into his third and final term as the city's 105th mayor.
  - March 7: Channel 5 changes its call letters from WNEW-TV to WNYW.
  - March 17: St. Patrick's Day – Rosanna Scotto joined WNYW Channel 5 as a news reporter for the station's 10 P.M. weeknight newscast. At the time, she said: "In Manhattan, Rosanna Scotto, Channel 5 News".
  - April 2: Koch signs the city's first ever homosexual rights bill.
  - July 7: A deranged man, Juan Gonzalez, wielding a machete kills 2 and wounds 9 on the Staten Island Ferry. In 2000 Gonzalez was granted unsupervised leave from his residence at the Bronx Psychiatric Hospital.
  - August 26: The "preppie murder": 18-year-old student Jennifer Levin is murdered by Robert Chambers in Central Park after the two had left a bar to have sex in the park. The case was sensationalized in the press and raised issues over victims' rights, as Chambers' attorney attempted to smear Levin's reputation to win his client's freedom.
  - October 4: Broadcaster Dan Rather is attacked on Park Avenue by two men, one of which repeated "Kenneth, what is the frequency?"
  - October 27: New York Mets won their second World Series title in franchise history, defeating the Boston Red Sox in 7 games.
  - November 13: Wollman Rink reopens after being shut for 6 years due to the efforts of Donald Trump.
  - November 19: 20-year-old Larry Davis opens fire on police officers attempting to arrest him in his sister's apartment in the Bronx. Six officers are wounded, and Davis eludes capture for the next 17 days, during which time he became something of a folk hero in the neighborhood. Davis was stabbed to death in jail in 2008.
  - November 24: 2 Port Authority police officers and a holdup were seriously shot and wounded in a shootout at a Queens diner.
  - December 20: A white mob in Howard Beach, Queens, attacks three African-American men whose car had broken down in the largely white neighborhood. One of the men, Michael Griffith is chased onto Shore Parkway where he is hit and killed by a passing car. The killing prompted several tempestuous marches through the neighborhood led by Al Sharpton.
  - Four World Financial Center built.
  - Le Bernardin restaurant in business.
- 1987
  - January 25: New York Giants win Super Bowl XXI at the Rose Bowl (stadium) in Pasadena, California, defeating the Denver Broncos, 39–20; it was the Giants first NFL Championship since 1956. Phil Simms was named the MVP of the game.
  - May 19: 11-year-old Juan Perez is mauled and killed by two polar bears after he and his friends sneak into the enclosure at the Prospect Park Zoo that night.
  - June 16: Bernhard Goetz is acquitted of the four attempted murders but convicted of one illegal gun possession count in 1984's subway shooting.
  - November 2: Joel Steinberg and his lover Hedda Nussbaum are arrested for the beating and neglect of their six-year-old adopted daughter Lisa Steinberg, who died two days later from her injuries. The case provoked outrage that did not subside when Steinberg was released from prison in 2004 after serving 15 years.
  - ACT UP is formed.
  - The New York Observer begins publication.
  - Knitting Factory cultural venue and Restaurant Aquavit in business.
  - Tibet House founded.
  - Dia Center for the Arts opens.
  - New York Cares is established.
- 1988
  - January 26: Phantom of the Opera opens on Broadway and earns the record of longest running show.
  - April 1: Bright Lights, Big City, period piece film about a cocaine addicted young Pennsylvanian fact checker in Manhattan, is released.
  - June 25: AIDS quilt on Central Park's Great Lawn
  - New York City Campaign Finance Board and Lower East Side Tenement Museum established.
  - World Financial Center is completed.
  - Human Rights Watch headquartered in city.
  - Tompkins Square Park riot (1988)
- 1989
  - April 19: Central Park jogger attacked.
  - August 23: Yusuf Hawkins murdered.
  - August 30: Leona Helmsley convicted of tax evasion.
  - November 7: David Dinkins, Manhattan Borough President, is elected as the city's first African-American mayor.
  - December 29: The funeral of former New York Yankees great Billy Martin is held at St. Patrick's Cathedral (Manhattan).
  - New York becomes a sanctuary city for illegal immigrants.
  - Angelika Film Center opens.
  - City Commission on Public Information & Communication created.
  - Fictional Seinfeld television programme begins broadcasting.

==== 1990s ====
- 1990
  - January 1: David Dinkins became the city's first African-American mayor.
  - January 25: Avianca Flight 52 to Kennedy airport crashes at Cove Neck, Long Island, after missing an approach and then running out of fuel. 73 of 158 passengers are killed.
  - March 8: The first of the copycat Zodiac Killer Heriberto Seda's eight shooting victims is wounded in an attack in Brooklyn. Between 1990 and 1993, Seda will wound 5 and kill 3 in his serial attacks. He is captured in 1996 and convicted in 1998.
  - March 25: Arson at the Happyland Social Club at 1959 Southern Boulevard in the East Tremont section of the Bronx kills 87 people unable to escape the packed dance club.
  - September 2: Tourist Brian Watkins from Utah is stabbed to death in the Seventh Avenue – 53rd Street station by a gang of youths. Watkins was visiting New York with his family to attend the US Open Tennis tournament in Queens, when he was killed defending his family from a gang of muggers. The killing marked a low point in the record murder year of 1990 (in which 2,242 were recorded) and led to an increased police presence in New York.
  - September 13: Law & Order TV show begins
  - November 5: Rabbi Meir Kahane, founder of the Jewish Defense League, is assassinated at the Marriott East Side Hotel at 48th Street and Lexington Avenue by El Sayyid Nosair.
  - City registers 2,245 murders, setting a record.
  - Population: 7,322,564.
- 1991
  - January 24: Arohn Kee rapes and murders 13-year-old Paola Illera in East Harlem while she is on her way home from school. Her body is later found near the FDR Drive. Over the next eight years, Kee murders two more women before being arrested in February 1999. He is sentenced to three life terms in prison in January 2001.
  - July 23: The body of a four-year-old girl is found in a cooler on the Henry Hudson Parkway in Inwood, Manhattan. The identity of the child, dubbed "Baby Hope", was unknown until October 2013, when 52-year-old Conrado Juarez is arrested after confessing to killing the girl, his cousin Anjelica Castillo, and dumping her body.
  - August 19: A Jewish automobile driver accidentally kills a seven-year-old African-American boy, thereby touching off the Crown Heights riots, during which an Australian Jew, Yankel Rosenbaum, was fatally stabbed by Lemrick Nelson.
  - August 28: A 4 train crashes just north of 14th Street – Union Square, killing 5 people. Motorman Robert Ray, who was intoxicated, fell asleep at the controls and was convicted of manslaughter in 1992.
  - October 31: Scores, the first major gentlemen's club (strip club) in New York, opens.
  - December 28: Nine people were crushed to death trying to enter the Nat Holman gymnasium at CCNY. The crowd was trying to gain entry to a celebrity basketball game featuring hip-hop and rap performers including Heavy D and Sean Combs.
  - Formation of rap group Wu Tang Clan from Staten Island.
- 1992
  - February 26: two teens were shot to death by 15 year-old Khalil Sumpter inside Thomas Jefferson High School (Brooklyn) an hour before a scheduled visit by then mayor David Dinkins. Sumpter was paroled in 1998 at the age of 22.
  - March 22: Ice buildup without subsequent de-icing causes USAir Flight 405 to crash on takeoff from LaGuardia Airport. 27 of the 51 on board are killed.
  - September 8: New York One, a television channel, launches on cable television.
  - December 10–13: A noreaster strikes the US Mid-Atlantic coast. The storm surge causes extensive flooding along the city shoreline.
  - December 17: Patrick Daly, Principal of P.S. 15 in Red Hook, Brooklyn is killed in the crossfire of a drug-related shooting while looking for a pupil who had left his school. The school was later renamed the Patrick Daly school after the beloved principal.
  - Guggenheim Museum SoHo opens.
  - LAByrinth Theater Company founded.
  - Sister city relationships established with Budapest, Hungary, and Rome, Italy.
- 1993
  - February 26: A bomb planted by terrorists explodes in the World Trade Center's underground garage, killing six people and injuring over a thousand, as well as causing much damage to the basement. See: World Trade Center bombing
  - June 6: The Golden Venture, a freighter carrying 286 illegal immigrants from China runs aground a quarter-mile off the coast of Rockaway, Queens killing 10 passengers.
  - September 13: Late Night with Conan O'Brien premieres
  - December 7: Colin Ferguson shoots 25 passengers, killing six, on a Long Island Rail Road commuter train out of Penn Station.
  - City Public Data Directory published.
  - New Yorkers Against Gun Violence headquartered in city.
  - Staten Islanders vote in favor of secession from the city.
  - Sister city relationship established with Jerusalem, Israel.
- 1994
  - January 1: Rudy Giuliani becomes mayor.
  - March 1: 1994 New York school bus shooting – Rashid Baz, a Lebanese-born Arab immigrant, opens fire on a van carrying members of the Lubavitch Hasidic sect of Jews driving on the Brooklyn Bridge. A 16-year-old student, Ari Halberstam later dies of his wounds. Baz was apparently acting out of revenge for the Cave of the Patriarchs massacre in Hebron, West Bank.
  - June 14: New York Rangers won the Stanley Cup, ending their 54-year drought. Brian Leetch became the first American to win the Conn Smythe Trophy as the MVP of the Stanley Cup Playoffs.
  - August: Hackers On Planet Earth conference begins.
  - August 31: William Tager shoots and kills Campbell Theron Montgomery, a technician employed by NBC, outside of the stage of the Today show. Tager is also identified as one of possibly two men who assaulted CBS News anchor Dan Rather on Park Avenue in 1986.
  - September: Friends debuts on NBC.
  - December 15: Disgruntled computer analyst Edward J. Leary firebombs a 3 train with homemade explosives at 145th Street, injuring two teenagers. Six days later, he firebombs a crowded 4 train at Fulton Street, injuring over 40. Leary is sentenced to 94 years in prison for both attacks.
  - December 22: Anthony Baez, a 29-year-old Bronx man, dies after being placed in an illegal chokehold by NYPD officer Francis X. Livoti. Livoti is sentenced to 7 1/2 years in 1998 for violating Baez' civil rights.
  - New York Underground Film Festival and Hackers on Planet Earth conference begin.
- 1995
  - June 5: In a collision on the Williamsburg Bridge, a Manhattan-bound J train crashed into a stopped Manhattan-bound M train after passing a red light at high speed, killing one and injuring 50.
  - December 8: A long racial dispute in Harlem over the eviction of an African-American record store-owner by a Jewish proprietor ends in murder and arson. 51-year-old Roland Smith Jr., angry over the proposed eviction, set fire to Freddie's Fashion Mart on 125th Street and opened fire on the store's employees, killing 7 and wounding four. Smith also perished in the blaze.
  - City website online (approximate date).
  - Luna Lounge in business.
  - Dahesh Museum of Art established.
- 1996
  - March 4: Second Avenue Deli owner Abe Lebewohl is shot and killed during a robbery. The murder of this popular deli owner and East Village fixture remains unsolved as of 2013.
  - June 4: 22-year-old drifter John Royster brutally beats a 32-year-old female piano teacher in Central Park, the first in a series of attacks over a period of eight days. Royster would go on to brutally beat another woman in Manhattan, rape a woman in Yonkers and beat a woman, Evelyn Alvarez, to death on Park Avenue on the Upper East Side of Manhattan. In 1998, Royster was sentenced to life in prison without parole.
  - July 17: TWA Flight 800 departs Kennedy airport and crashes in the Atlantic Ocean south of Long Island, killing all 230 people on board.
  - October 26: New York Yankees won the 23rd World Series championship, their first in 18 years, defeating the Atlanta Braves in 6 games.
  - Magnolia Bakery in business.
  - The Daily Show (television programme) begins broadcasting.
  - Skyscraper Museum established.
- 1997
  - February 23: 1997 Empire State Building shooting.
  - May 11: Deep Blue versus Garry Kasparov chess match held.
  - May 30: Jonathan Levin a Bronx teacher and son of former Time Warner CEO Gerald Levin is robbed and murdered by his former student Corey Arthur.
  - August 9: Abner Louima is beaten and sodomized with a plunger at the 70th Precinct house in Brooklyn by several NYPD officers, who were led by Justin Volpe.
  - September 15: Museum of Jewish Heritage opens.
  - November 7: A Manhattan couple, Camden Sylvia, 36, and Michael Sullivan, 54, disappear from their loft at 76 Pearl Street in Manhattan after arguing with their landlord over a lack of heat in their apartment. The landlord, Robert Rodriguez, pleaded guilty to tax evasion, larceny and credit card fraud following the missing persons investigation. The couple is presumed dead.
  - Chelsea Market, Balthazar (restaurant), and The Mercer Hotel in business.
  - Center for Urban Pedagogy established.
- 1998
  - January 14: 1998 Bank of America robbery.
  - May 17: David Wells pitched a perfect game, as he and the New York Yankees defeat the Minnesota Twins, 4–0. It was the 2nd perfect game in Yankees history.
  - June 1998: News 12 The Bronx was launched.
  - September 2: Swissair Flight 111 departs Kennedy airport and crashes off the coast of Nova Scotia.
  - October 21: New York Yankees won their 24th World Series championship, sweeping the San Diego Padres in 4, finishing with their highest ever with 125 wins, and just 50 losses.
  - Fictional Sex and the City television programme begins broadcasting.
  - The Strokes musical group formed.
- 1999
  - January 3: 32-year-old Kendra Webdale is killed after being pushed in front of an oncoming subway train at the 23rd Street station by Andrew Goldstein, a 29-year-old schizophrenic. The case ultimately led to the passage of Kendra's Law.
  - February 4: Unarmed African immigrant Amadou Bailo Diallo is shot and killed by 4 New York City police officers, sparking massive protests against police brutality and racial profiling.
  - March 8: Amy Watkins, a 26-year-old social worker from Kansas who worked with battered women in the Bronx, is stabbed to death in a botched robbery near her home in Prospect Heights, Brooklyn. Her two assailants were sentenced to 25 years to life in prison.
  - June: Debut of the Staten Island Yankees, marking the return of baseball to the Island since the demise in 1887 of the New York Metropolitans.
  - September 20: Law & Order: Special Victims Unit first debuts on NBC
  - October 31: EgyptAir Flight 990 departs Kennedy airport and crashes off the coast of Nantucket.
  - Blackplanet.com website launched.
  - Don Diva magazine headquartered in city.
  - Deaths in New York City from AIDS exceed 75,000 since the onset of the disease.

== Contemporary history ==
=== 2000s ===
- 2000
  - January 21: American Psycho, film about a psychopathic serial killing investment banker in Manhattan, is released.
  - March 16: Patrick Dorismond is shot and killed by an NYPD officer in a case of mistaken identity during a drug bust.
  - May 24: Wendy's massacre in Flushing, Queens.
  - October 25: Yankees win Game 5 of the 2000 World Series versus the Mets.
  - Acela Express train begins operating between Washington, D.C. and Boston, stopping at New York Penn Station.
  - Population: 8,008,288. First time population officially reaches this mark, and marks reversal of suburban flight of the 1970s and 1980s with an increase of nearly one million residents over two decades. Over 1.2 million foreign-born residents arrive in New York between 1990 and 2000.
  - Polish Cultural Institute in New York founded.
- 2001
  - January 17: an earthquake measuring 2.5 on the Ritcher Scale strikes the city.
  - January 28: the New York Giants lose to the Baltimore Ravens in Super Bowl XXXV.
  - May 10: Actress Jennifer Stahl is killed with two other people in an armed robbery in her apartment above the Carnegie Deli in Manhattan. The victims were bound and shot point-blank in the head.
  - June 25: Baseball returns to Brooklyn for the first time since the 1957 departure of the Dodgers with the first game of the Brooklyn Cyclones in Coney Island.
  - September 11: The two World Trade Center twin towers and several surrounding buildings are destroyed by two jetliners in part of a coordinated terrorist attack by radical terrorists ("9/11"), killing 2,976 people who were in the towers and on the ground.
  - November 4: Yankees lose Game 7 of the 2001 World Series to the Arizona Diamondbacks.
  - November 12: American Airlines Flight 587 crashes into the Belle Harbor neighborhood of Queens shortly after takeoff from Kennedy airport, killing all 260 onboard and five persons on the ground.
  - Neue Galerie New York opens.
  - Institute of Culinary Education active.
  - Sister city relationship established with London, United Kingdom.
  - Liszt Institute New York opened.

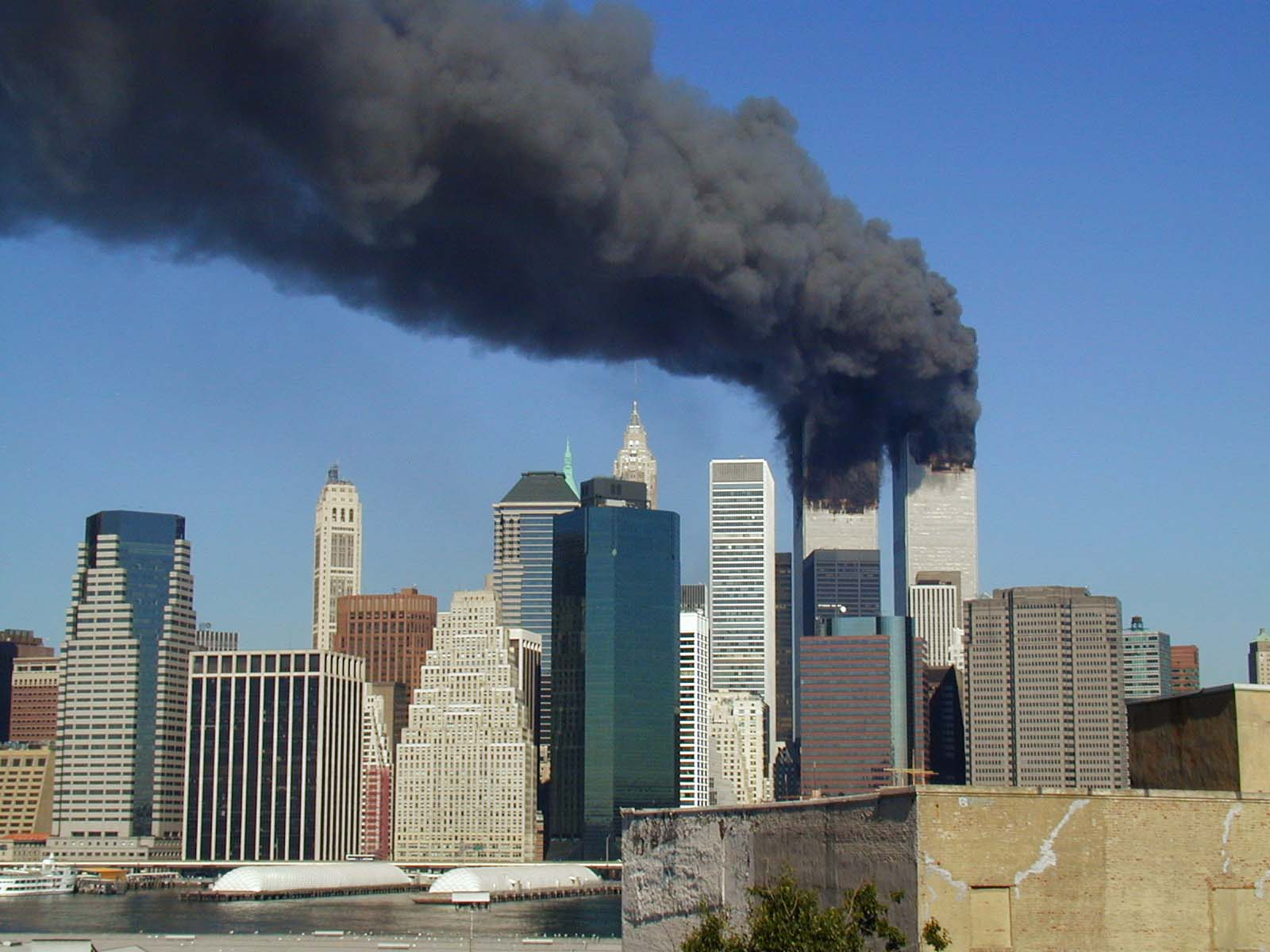
September 11 attacks, 2001

- 2002
  - January 1:Michael Bloomberg becomes the 108th Mayor of New York.
  - January: New York City is put in a "Drought Warning" after a warm and dry winter. That is upgraded to a "Drought Emergency" in March until the Fall.
  - March 11: The Tribute in Light memorial is unveiled and lit up every day for the next month. It has since been lit up every September 11.
  - The Tribeca Film Festival was founded by Robert De Niro, Jane Rosenthal and Craig Hatkoff.
  - March 19: YES Network was launched.
- 2003
  - January 24: Four teenage boys drown in the Long Island Sound near City Island when their overloaded dinghy sinks. A communication misunderstanding between them and the 911 dispatcher contributed to their deaths
  - February 15: Between 300,000 and 400,000 people participate in the February 15, 2003 anti-war protests.
  - March 10: Police officers James Nemorin and Rodney Andrews are killed during an undercover drug sting in Staten Island. Their killer was originally sentenced to death, but this was changed to life in prison after the death penalty was ruled unconstitutional in the state.
  - May 16: 57-year-old Alberta Spruill died of heart failure due to the use of stun grenades when police raided her Harlem apartment looking for drugs after a tip from an unreliable informant
  - July 23: Othniel Askew shoots to death political rival City Council member James E. Davis in the City Hall chambers of the New York City Council.
  - August 14: New York loses power in a blackout that affects eight states as well as parts of Canada.
  - October 6: Ming of Harlem is rescued, along with an alligator in another room, in an apartment in East Harlem. Both animals are safely rescued.
  - October 11–12: The first-ever Open House New York Weekend takes place, with more than 75 buildings opening to the public.
  - October 15: The Staten Island Ferry boat Andrew J. Barberi collides with a pier at the St. George Ferry Terminal in Staten Island, killing ten people and injuring 43 others.
  - October 25: Yankees lose Game 6 of the 2003 World Series to the Florida Marlins.
  - November 3: The last 11 R33/36 World's Fair cars make their final trip on the 7 service, marking the end of the Redbird trains in the New York City Subway.
  - December 17: AirTrain JFK opens, now carrying over 10 million passengers annually.
  - Celia Cruz Bronx High School of Music established.
  - Time Warner Center built.
  - City 3-1-1 hotline and NYC Media launched.
  - Bill passed requiring online access to all city reports and publications.
  - wd~50 restaurant in business.
  - Sister city relationship established with Johannesburg, South Africa.
- 2004
  - February 22: all four New York City Subway tracks of the Manhattan Bridge are opened in service for the first time since 1986.
  - May 25: The body of 21-year-old Juilliard student Sarah Fox is found in Inwood Hill Park six days after she is reported missing.
  - July: First Shake Shack opens in Madison Square Park.
  - August 30 – September 2: 2004 Republican National Convention held.
  - Momofuku restaurant in business.
  - Sister city relationship established with Brasília, Brazil.
- 2005
  - January 27: Nicole duFresne is shot dead on the Lower East Side of Manhattan.
  - February 18: Trash bags containing the body parts of Rashawn Brazell, who was reported missing four days earlier, are found in the Nostrand Avenue station.
  - September 19: First episode of How I Met Your Mother, set in Manhattan, airs.
  - October 31: Peter Braunstein sexually assaults a co-worker while posing as a fireman, later leading officials on a multi-state manhunt. Braunstein was later sentenced to life and will be eligible for parole in 2023.
  - November: After over 190 years in Manhattan the Fulton Fish Market moves to Hunts Point in the Bronx.
  - December 20: Third New York City Transit strike lasts three days due to stiff penalties imposed to TWU Local 100 under the Taylor Law.
- 2006
  - January 11: 7-year-old Nixzmary Brown dies after being beaten by her stepfather, Cesar Rodriguez, in their Brooklyn apartment. Rodriguez was convicted of first-degree manslaughter in March 2008.
  - February 25: Criminology graduate student Imette St. Guillen is brutally tortured, raped, and killed in New York City after being abducted outside the Falls bar in the SoHo section of Manhattan. Bouncer Darryl Littlejohn is convicted of the crime and sentenced to life imprisonment.
  - April: One World Trade Center construction begins.
  - April 1: New York University (NYU) student Broderick Hehman is killed after being hit by a car in Harlem. Hehman was chased into the street by a group of black teens who allegedly shouted "get the white boy". The death of Hehman echoed the death of Michael Griffith (manslaughter victim) 20 years earlier in Queens.
  - May 23: 7 World Trade Center is the first tower completed at ground zero.
  - May 29: Jeff Gross, founder of the Staten Island commune Ganas, is shot and wounded by former commune member Rebekah Johnson. Johnson was captured in Philadelphia on June 18, 2007, after being featured on America's Most Wanted.
  - June 22: The body of 16-year-old Chanel Petro-Nixon is found in Bedford-Stuyvesant, Brooklyn four days after she vanished.
  - July: Parts of Queens suffer a blackout during a heatwave.
  - July 25: Jennifer Moore, an 18-year-old student from New Jersey is abducted and killed after a night of drinking at a Chelsea bar. Her body is found outside a Weehawken motel. 35-year-old Draymond Coleman was convicted of the crime and sentenced to 50 years in 2010.
  - September 30: CBGB closes.
  - October 8: Michael Sandy, a 29-year-old man, is hit by a car on the Belt Parkway in Brooklyn after being beaten by a group of white attackers. Sandy died of his injuries on October 13, 2006. The attack, which is being investigated as a hate crime hearkened back to the killing of Michael Griffith in 1986.
  - October 11: A general aviation aircraft owned by New York Yankees pitcher Cory Lidle crashes into the 31st floor of the Belaire Apartments on the Upper East Side of Manhattan. Lidle, 34, is killed in the crash along with his flight instructor.
  - November 25: Four NYPD officers fire a combined 50 shots at a group of unarmed men in Jamaica, Queens, wounding two and killing 23-year-old Sean Bell. The case sparks controversy over police brutality and racial profiling.
  - New York City Global Partners established.
  - Gun offender registration ordinance enacted.
- 2007
  - January 2: film student Cameron Hollopeter suffered a seizure in the station and fell off the platform onto the tracks at the 137th Street-City College station. Wesley Autrey saved his life as a train was approaching. Autrey was given numerous awards and prizes, and his two daughters were given a scholarship.
  - March 14: 32-year-old David Garvin goes on a shooting rampage in Greenwich Village, killing a pizzeria employee and two auxiliary police officers before NYPD officers fatally shoot him.
  - July 9: Police officer Russel Timoshenko is shot on duty after pulling over a stolen vehicle in Crown Heights, Brooklyn and dies five days later.
  - July 18: A steam pipe explosion kills one and wounds twenty others near the corner of Lexington Avenue and East 41st Street in Manhattan.
  - The New York Times Building is finished.
  - Beaver José spotted in Bronx River.
- 2008
  - February 3: The New York Giants win Super Bowl XLII, defeating the previously undefeated New England Patriots.
  - February 12: Psychologist Kathryn Faughey is brutally murdered in her Manhattan office by a mentally ill man whose intended victim was a psychiatrist in the same practice.,
  - March: 2008 Times Square bombing.
  - March 15: A crane collapse at a construction site in Turtle Bay kills seven and damages adjacent buildings.
  - September 15: Lehman Brothers goes bankrupt.
  - October 3: City Council votes to relax mayoral term limits to allow Michael Bloomberg to run and serve for a third term.
  - December 2: 25-year-old aspiring dancer Laura Garza disappears after leaving a Manhattan nightclub with a sex offender named Michael Mele. Her remains are found in Olyphant, Pennsylvania in April 2010. On the first day of his trial in January 2012, Mele admits to killing Garza and pleads guilty to first-degree manslaughter.
  - December 11: Ponzi schemer Madoff arrested.
  - Shea Stadium and Yankee Stadium I closes.
- 2009
  - January 15: US Airways Flight 1549 ditches in the Hudson River after both engines fail; all 150 passengers and five crew are successfully evacuated.
  - Times Square begins pedestrianization.
  - 311 service initiated
  - High Line Park Phase I and Bank of America Tower completed.
  - Kickstarter in business.
  - Citi Field and new Yankee Stadium open.
  - New York Yankees win the World Series, first since 2000 and 27th overall.
  - Iraq Veterans Against the War headquartered in city.
  - NYC BigApps contest begins.

=== 2010s ===
- 2010
  - February 26: Blizzard dumps 21 inches on Central Park, making the month of February the 4th snowiest in history.
  - May: 2010 Times Square car bombing attempt.
  - May: 2010 Review Conference for the Treaty on the Non-Proliferation of Nuclear Weapons held at UN.
  - May 29: The second Luna Park opens.
  - September 16: Strong thunderstorms and two tornadoes hit Brooklyn, Queens and Staten Island, killing one woman when a tree fell onto her car on the Grand Central Parkway.
  - Beekeeping legalized.
  - Humans of New York begins publication.
  - Fictional Louie (TV series) begins broadcasting.
  - FoodCorps headquartered in city.
  - Population: 8,175,133; metro 18,897,109. Manhattan's white population exceeds 50% for the first time since the 1970s.
- 2011
  - February 11: Maksim Gelman goes on 28-hour rampage, killing 5 and wounding 6 others throughout Brooklyn and Manhattan. He is sentenced to life imprisonment.
  - April: WeWork opens its first location in SoHo.
  - May 17: Weiner sexting scandal first reported.
  - May 23: Smoking ban takes effect in all parks, boardwalks, beaches, recreation centers, swimming pools and pedestrian plazas.
  - June: High Line Phase II opens.
  - July 13: The body of 8-year-old Leiby Kletzky is found dismembered in two locations in Brooklyn after he was allegedly murdered by a 35-year-old Orthodox Jewish clerk.
  - August 28: Hurricane Irene dumps heavy rain and floods most of the city.
  - September 12: National 9/11 Memorial opens.
  - September 17: Occupy Wall Street begins.
- 2012
  - February 5: New York Giants win Super Bowl football contest over the New England Patriots.
  - June 1: Johan Santana throws the first no-hitter in New York Mets history, defeating the St. Louis Cardinals 8–0. Santana throws 134 pitches during the historic night.
  - August 24: 2012 Empire State Building shooting.
  - October: NBA Nets play their first game in the Barclays Center, bringing professional sports back to Brooklyn for the first time since the departure of the Dodgers in 1957.
  - October 29–30: Hurricane Sandy brings flooding and high winds that result in several deaths and widespread power outages. The New York Stock Exchange, public schools, and all mass transit service were closed as a result. At least 43 deaths have been directly attributed to the storm in New York City alone.
- 2013
  - March 9: 16-year-old Kimani Gray dies after being shot by undercover New York police officers in Brooklyn.
  - March 11: A vigil for Kimani Gray turned into a riot in Flatbush, Brooklyn.
  - May 21: New York City Football Club established.
  - September 21: First NHL game ever played in Brooklyn with relocation from Long Island of the New York Islanders. The move ultimately does not go well and the team in 2018 announced its intention to move out of Brooklyn back to Long Island.
  - November 13: Four World Trade Center opens.
  - December 1: Four people are killed and scores injured after a Metro-North Railroad train derailed near the Spuyten Duyvil station in the Bronx.
  - 21st Century Fox headquartered in city.
  - Population: 8,405,837.
- 2014
  - January 1: Bill de Blasio becomes mayor.
  - March 12: 8 people are killed and over 70 others are injured when an explosion in Harlem destroyed two five-story buildings. A gas leak is suspected as the likely cause of the explosion.
  - March 20: .nyc internet domain name established.
  - May 21: National 9/11 Museum opens.
  - July 17: Death of Eric Garner.
  - September: High Line Phase III opens.
  - October 23: 2014 Queens hatchet attack.
  - October: 432 Park Avenue topped out, becoming the tallest building in New York City by roof height and tallest residential building in the world.
  - November 3: One World Trade Center, the tallest building in the United States and the Western Hemisphere by architectural height, opens.
  - November 10: Fulton Center, a great subway and retail complex in Lower Manhattan, is completed.
  - December 20: 2014 killings of NYPD officers; two police officers are killed.
- 2015
  - January: Premiere of Miranda's musical Hamilton.
  - January 12: New York City launches IDNYC, a municipal identification card system.
  - March 26: Two people are killed and 22 people are injured in the East Village of Manhattan after another gas explosion likely caused by a gas leak leveled three buildings.
  - May 2: Police officer Brian Moore is murdered on duty in Hollis, Queens.
  - July: Disability Pride Parade held.
  - September: 7 Subway Extension opens, making 34th Street–Hudson Yards the first new station in 25 years.
  - September 24–26: Pope Francis visits New York City and becomes an honorary New Yorker by way of an IDNYC municipal identification card.
  - Whitney Museum moves to Gansevoort Street.
  - November 1: New York Mets lose Game 5 of the 2015 World Series to the Kansas City Royals.
  - Donald Trump presidential campaign, 2016 headquartered in city (at the Trump Tower).
  - Hillary Clinton presidential campaign, 2016 also headquartered in city (in Downtown Brooklyn).
  - New York City Football Club debuts in MLS.

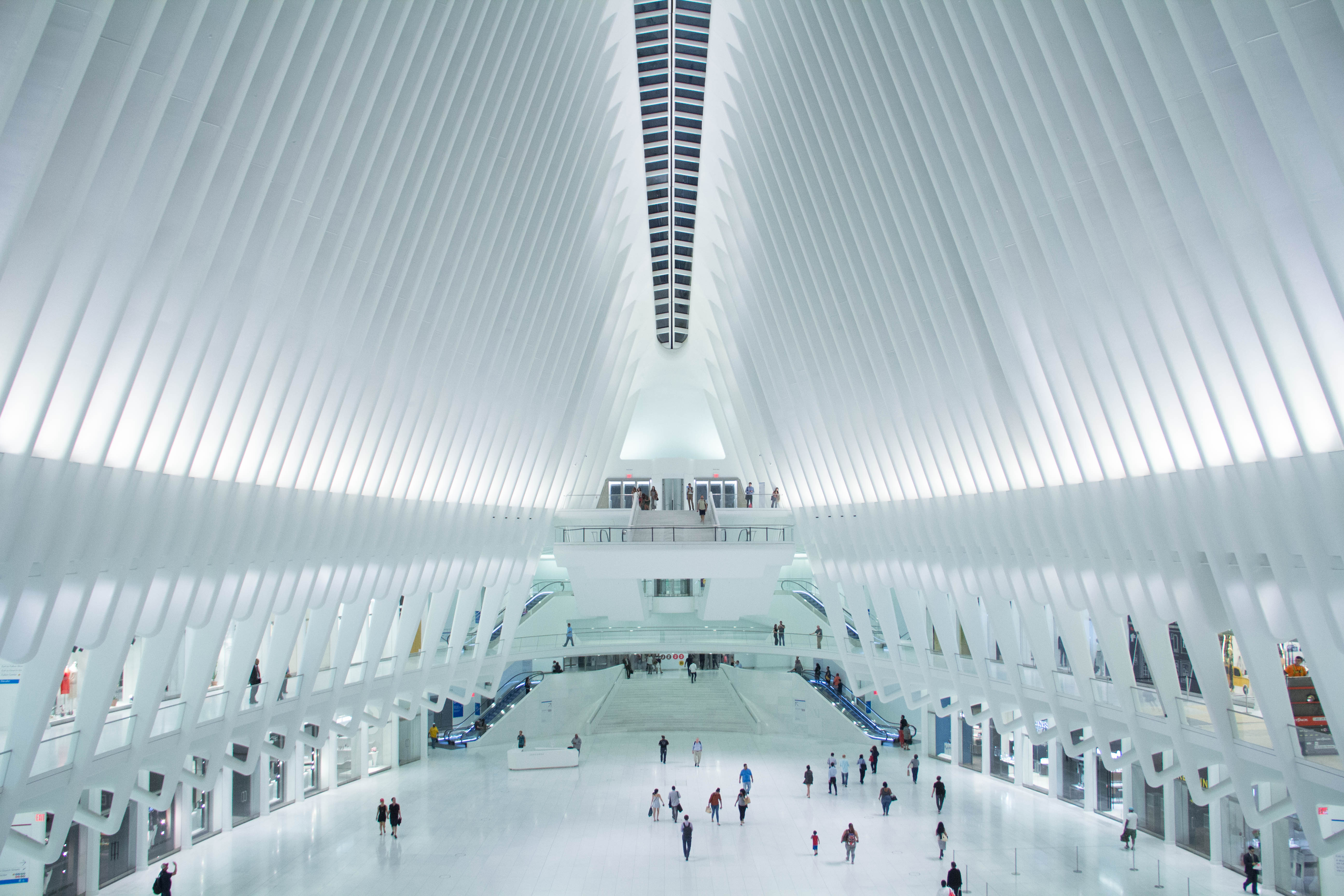
World Trade Center Transportation Hub in 2016

- 2016
  - January 23: The city receives a record 27.5 inches of snow from a blizzard.
  - March 3: World Trade Center Transportation Hub (Oculus) completed.
  - August 2: Karina Vetrano is murdered by Chanel Lewis while jogging in Spring Creek Park.
  - September 17: 2016 Manhattan explosion. A bomb explodes in Chelsea, Manhattan, wounding 29 people. A second device—reportedly a pressure cooker attached to wiring and a mobile phone—was found four blocks from the site of the explosion and was removed safely. A suspect, Ahmad Khan Rahami, is apprehended two days later.
  - November 9: Anti-Trump post-election protest begins.
  - December 31: Main location of Carnegie Deli closes.
- 2017
  - January 1: After decades of delay the Second Avenue Subway opens.
  - January 20: Queens native Donald Trump is sworn in as the 45th President of the United States, the first from the outer boroughs to become president and the most recent New Yorker to become president since Franklin Delano Roosevelt.
  - January 21: Women's protest against U.S. president Trump.
  - Kosciuszko Bridge rebuilt.
  - April: Over one million IDNYC municipal identification cards were registered by April 2017.
  - July 5: Police officer Miosotis Familia is shot and killed in her command center vehicle in The Bronx. Her killer is then killed by responding officers,
  - September 17: Final print edition of the Village Voice distributed.
  - October 31: Terrorist truck attack on bike path near West Street kills eight and injures 11.
  - December 11: Attempted terrorist attack at the Port Authority injures 4.
  - December 28: An apartment building fire in Belmont, Bronx kill 13 people and injures 14.
  - City registers only 290 murders, the lowest since 1928 and the lowest per capita since 1945.
- 2018
  - January 1: New Year is rung in at 10 degrees Fahrenheit (−12 °C), coldest in 100 years and second coldest on record.
  - March 11: A sightseeing helicopter crashes in the East River near the Upper East Side, killing five tourists.
  - June 11: Three World Trade Center opens.
  - June 20: 15-year old Lesandro Guzman-Felix is murdered by members of the Trinitarios gang at a Bronx bodega in a case of mistaken identity.
  - July: 30 Hudson Yards tops out as tallest building in Hudson Yards Redevelopment Project and features an 80-foot cantilever observation deck.
  - December 27: An electrical fault at the Queens Con Edison power plant causes the night sky over New York City to briefly turn blue.
- 2019
  - May 19: Empire Outlets New York City, a retail complex in Staten Island, opens its doors after construction in 2015. This is the first outlet mall in New York City. This is developed by SHoP Architects.
  - June 28: Central Park's beloved hilltop castle reopened after a 15-month renovation that reinvigorated the 1858 structure's original look.
  - August 10: Jeffrey Epstein commits suicide in the Manhattan Detention Center while awaiting trial for recruiting underage girls for sexual service,
  - October 3: Launch of 14th Street Busway (M14 Select Bus Service).
  - In 2019 there was a record number of 66.6 million of visitors to New York City and an industry's economic impact for $80.3 billion.

=== 2020s ===
- 2020
  - Over 1.3 million people are registered with New York City's municipal identification card ("IDNYC") program.
  - February: Genomic analyses suggest that COVID-19 disease had been introduced to New York as early as Mid-February, and that most cases were linked to Europe, rather than Asia.
  - March 1: A 39-year-old health care worker who had returned home to Manhattan from Iran on February 25 became the first confirmed case of COVID-19 in New York.
  - March 15: all schools in the New York City Department of Education (NYCDOE) system closed until at least mid-April.
  - March 22: The city goes into a state of lockdown due to the COVID-19 pandemic.
  - March 30: The Mercy-class hospital ship USNS Comfort (T-AH-20) arrived in New York City to assist in against the COVID-19 pandemic.
  - May 8: The Trump Death Clock website unveiled a companion billboard in Times Square. The Trump Death Clock is based on the claim that had measures been implemented one week earlier, 60% of American COVID-19 deaths would have been avoided.
  - May 25: The murder of George Floyd leads to a series of protests in New York City and throughout the world.
  - May 25: Christian Cooper was subjected to false accusations in the Central Park birdwatching incident. The first online Black Birders Week on May 31 to June 5, 2020, was created in response to the incident.
  - June: Bicyclists form Street Riders NYC, which held several protests through December 2020 to raise awareness about systemic racism and police brutality.
  - December 14: Sandra Lindsay, a Registered Nurse at Long Island Jewish Medical Center, became the first recipient of the first dosage of the then only Emergency Use Authorization (EUA) approved COVID-19 vaccine - the Pfizer–BioNTech COVID-19 vaccine.
  - Population: 8,804,190.
- 2021
  - January 4: Registered Nurse Sandra Lindsay, received her second and final dosage of an EUA approved COVID-19 vaccine. With the second dosage, she is expected to have a 95% immunity to COVID-19.
  - February 5: SOMOS Community Care opened up Yankee Stadium as a COVID-19 vaccination "mega-site" operated by the SOMOS and the New York National Guard. Former Yankees Mariano Rivera participated in the opening of the site.
  - February 10: Citi Field is converted into a COVID-19 vaccination "mega-site" operated by the City of New York.
  - September 1: Hurricane Ida brings heavy rain and intense flooding in the city, crippling the New York City Subway and commuter rails.
  - November 10: Parents of students at P.S. 333 on W. 93rd Street on the city's Upper West Side express safety concerns regarding scaffolding on the school.
  - December 11: New York City FC wins the first MLS Cup in its own history.
- 2022
  - January 1: Eric Adams became the 110th Mayor of New York City.
  - January 1: Mark Levine became the 28th Manhattan Borough President.
  - January 9: 17 people are killed in an apartment fire in the Bronx.
  - January 21: A shooting in Harlem killed one NYPD officer, Jason Rivera, instantly. His partner, Wilber Mora, dies four days later. The shooter, LaShawn McNeil, is killed by another officer.
  - April 12: A shooting on the N train, inside the 36th Street subway station in Sunset Park (Brooklyn), injured 29 people.
  - September 14: New York City FC wins the Campeonas Cup defeating Mexico's Atlas FC 2–0.
  - October 4: Aaron Judge hits his 62nd home run breaking the American League record, beating out Roger Maris' 61 home runs
- 2023
  - April 16: The Phantom of the Opera closes after 35 years on Broadway, having set the record for longest-running Broadway show
  - April 18: A collapse in a parking garage in lower Manhattan leaves one dead and six injured
  - May 1: Killing of Jordan Neely
  - June 6: 2023 Central Canada wildfires cause dangerous air pollution and extreme smoke around the city. Many people consider it a serious health warning and take precautions by wearing a mask. Pedestrians experience trouble breathing and itching in the eyes, and damage to lungs.
  - June 28: Domingo German, of the New York Yankees, throws the 24th perfect game in MLB history against the Oakland Athletics, defeating them 11–0. German becomes the fourth Yankee to throw a perfect game.
  - July 14: Suspected Long Island Serial Killer Rex Heuermann is arrested in Midtown Manhattan as a suspect in the murders of three of "the Gilgo Four" victims, Megan Waterman, Melissa Barthelemy, and Amber Costello.
  - August 4: Social Media influencer Kai Cenat incites extreme violence in Union Square, Manhattan. Cenat held a PlayStation 5 and gift card giveaway with Twitch streamer Fanum. More than a thousand of his followers appeared at the event. Some of the teenagers showed up, climbed on buses, broke car windows, and clashed with the NYPD. Cenat was later charged for the outburst.
  - August 23: Seventeen year old Noah Legaspi jumps off the Mandarin Oriental Hotel in Columbus Circle after a breakup with his girlfriend. He falls 750 feet onto the glass awning and his body splits in half, while his arm lands on the other side of the street.
  - September 29: Tropical Storm Ophelia floods the city with 8 inches of rain, a record for the city. The rain causes wild scenes of buses flooded, submerged cars, and people wading knee deep through water. La Guardia Airport terminals are badly flooded, and many flights are delayed. A sea lion at Central Park Zoo escapes her pool enclosure due to the torrential rain, but is eventually returned to the facility's grounds safely.
  - October: Pro-Palestine and Pro-Israel rallies occur throughout the city, including Washington Square Park and near the United Nations, after the October 7 attacks against Israel. Governor Kathy Hochul eventually goes to Israel in support of the country, New York City has the highest population of Jewish people outside of Israel.
  - More than 95,000 migrants enter the city throughout the year. Many are housed throughout the five boroughs. The Roosevelt Hotel becomes a hot spot destination for new arrivals.
- 2024
  - January 2: A very rare 1.7 Magnitude earthquake jolts residents in Roosevelt Island as well as Queens.
  - February 23: Flaco (owl) dies after colliding into an Upper West Side building. The Owl became famous after escaping the Central Park Zoo, due to damage by multiple trespassers to his enclosure. The owl escaped through a hole left by the vandals in the exhibit's stainless steel mesh. A memorial was held two days later, with hundreds attending and mourning.
  - March 6: Governor Hochul employs 1,000 National Guard (United States) on the subway platforms throughout the city to ensure safety, due to the uptick in crime in the subway systems. This is the first time since the 9/11 attacks that the National Guard has been employed.
  - March 25: NYPD officer Jonathan Diller is shot and killed in Far Rockaway, Queens after investigating an illegally parked car. One of the men inside the car took out a gun and shot Diller. He was rushed to the hospital and pronounced dead. Former President Donald Trump attended his wake along with Mayor Adams and Governor Hochul.
  - March 27: Six people are stabbed at New Dawn Charter High School in Jamaica, Queens; they were all wounded, and five students were arrested.
  - April 5: An earthquake with a magnitude of 4.8 hits the city, originating in Lebanon, New Jersey. Many residents felt a sudden shake and objects falling around. It is believed to be one of the strongest East coast earthquakes in a century.
  - April 19: Max Azzarello, a conspiracy theorist, sets himself on fire outside of the courthouse where former President Donald Trump is on trial for his hush money charge to Porn Star Stormy Daniels. Azzarello dies from his injuries a day later.
  - May 23: Former President Donald Trump holds a rally in Crotona Park located in the South Bronx. Thousands of residents around the boroughs attend the event.
  - September 25: Eric Adams becomes the city's first sitting mayor to be indicted by a grand jury. He is charged with, conspiracy to receive campaign contributions from foreign nationals, bribery, and wire fraud. He denies any of the allegations at hand.
  - October 20: The New York Liberty win their first WNBA championship, defeating the Minnesota Lynx in five games. The finals MVP is awarded to Jonquel Jones, Mayor Adams awards them a parade throughout the city the following the week.
  - October 27: Donald Trump holds a rally at Madison Square Garden for his 2024 Presidential Campaign. Tens of thousands of residents around the city as well as the state attend the event.
  - October 30: New York Yankees lose game 5 of the 2024 World Series to the Los Angeles Dodgers
  - December 4: UnitedHealth Group CEO Brian Thompson (businessman) is shot and killed. The shooting occurred in front of the New York Hilton Midtown, where UnitedHealth Group was hosting an investor event. The words "deny", "defend", and "depose", were found written on shell casings at the scene. Police believe this may indicate a motive, as they are similar to "delay, deny, defend", a popular insurance industry phrase about not paying out claims. Thompson's wife said that he had received threats in the past, citing lack of coverage as a possible reason for the threats.
  - December 22: An undocumented immigrant Sebastian Zapeta-Calil immolates 57-year-old Debrina Kawam on a subway train in Brooklyn.
- 2025
  - January 5: Congestion pricing in New York City goes into place.
  - April 10: A helicopter carrying a family of five from Spain crashes into the Hudson River. All of the members of the family die including the pilot.
  - May 17: Cuauhtémoc Brooklyn Bridge collision: Mexican Navy ship strikes the Brooklyn Bridge, killing 2 on board.
  - June 14: Over 200,000 people march in the June 2025 No Kings protests across the city.
  - July 28: 2025 Midtown Manhattan shooting: 27-year-old Shane Tamura kills 4 in an office building before committing suicide.
  - August 16: Three people were killed and 10 others were wounded in an alleged gang-related shooting at a lounge in Central Brooklyn.
  - September 13: New York City turns 400, leading to many events taking place.
  - October 18: Over 350,000 people march in the October 2025 No Kings protests across the city.
  - November 6: Zohran Mamdani elected mayor.
- 2026
  - January 1: Zohran Mamdani becomes Mayor of New York City
  - January 3: Nicolás Maduro and his wife were captured by US forces during the 2026 United States strikes in Venezuela.They were then transported to the Metropolitan Detention Center in Brooklyn, where they remained incarcerated.
  - January-February: More than 16 die from extremely cold weather. Most of the deceased are homeless pedestrians, not electing to go inside.
  - March 7: 2026 New York City bombing attempt
  - March 22: Air Canada Express Flight 8646 crashes into a fire truck as it landed on the runway, killing both pilots and injuring over 40 on board. Flight 8646 was the first fatal accident at LaGuardia airport in 34 years, when USAir Flight 405 crashed on the same day in 1992. The driver in the truck was not injured during the tragic collision.
  - June 8: President Donald Trump attends Game 3 of the 2026 NBA Finals in Madison Square Garden between the New York Knicks and San Antonio Spurs. Trump becomes the first sitting president to attend an NBA Finals game.
  - June 13: The New York Knicks prevail against the San Antonio Spurs in Game 5 to win their first championship since 1973. Jalen Brunson is crowned Finals MVP.
  - June 17: Romanch Mahajan, a tourist from India, died after falling from a runaway horse-drawn carriage in Central Park. The horse unexpectedly bolted while the driver was out of his seat taking photos. Mahajan reportedly jumped or fell from the careening carriage trying to save his mother. The tragic event comes amid a protest to end horse carriages in Central Park, after a horse died weeks prior to the incident with the tourist, after swallowing a poisonous plant while riding during the day.
  - July 1: 2026 Empire State Building climb
  - July 3: Wedding of Taylor Swift and Travis Kelce is held at Madison Square Garden.
  - August 31: 2026 Times Square stabbing attack

== Annual events ==
- Coney Island Polar Bear Club's New Year's Day annual swim.
- St. Patrick's Day Parade (New York) in March
- Easter parade on Easter Sunday.
- Manhattanhenge sunset alignments occur around May 28 and July 13.
- Puerto Rican Day Parade (along Fifth Avenue) in June
- Museum Mile Festival in June
- LGBT Pride March in late June
- Macy's 4th of July Fireworks show (along the East River or Hudson River)
- Celebrate Israel Parade
- Dominican Day Parade in mid-August
- Labor Day Carnival celebration of West Indian heritage along Eastern Parkway in Brooklyn
- San Gennaro Festival (in Little Italy)
- African American Day Parade in September.
- Von Steuben Day September 17 – Celebration of German-Americans
- Feast of San Gennaro in mid September.
- Pulaski Day Parade in early October
- Columbus Day Parade in October (largest in the US)
- New York City marathon in November (first Sunday of November)
- Macy's Thanksgiving Day Parade (along Central Park West and Broadway)
- Rockefeller Center Christmas tree lighting
- Manhattanhenge sunrise alignments occur around December 5 and January 8.
- Times Square Ball Drop (on New Year's Eve)

New York Citys adds its going to do a re do of its Macy 4 July fireworks show tickets giveaway after Wednesday planned failed because the website was inaccessible.

The city adds it will reopen website at 10 am on Thursday. They will be given on first come first served basis. There is limit of 2 per person.

The mayor office posted about website issues on social media Wednesday.

Spokesperson for Mayor Eric Adams said almost 2000 people were able to select ticket Wednesday. The city had touted a 10,000 ticket giveaway it has 8000 left.

== Evolution of the Manhattan map ==
=== 19th century ===
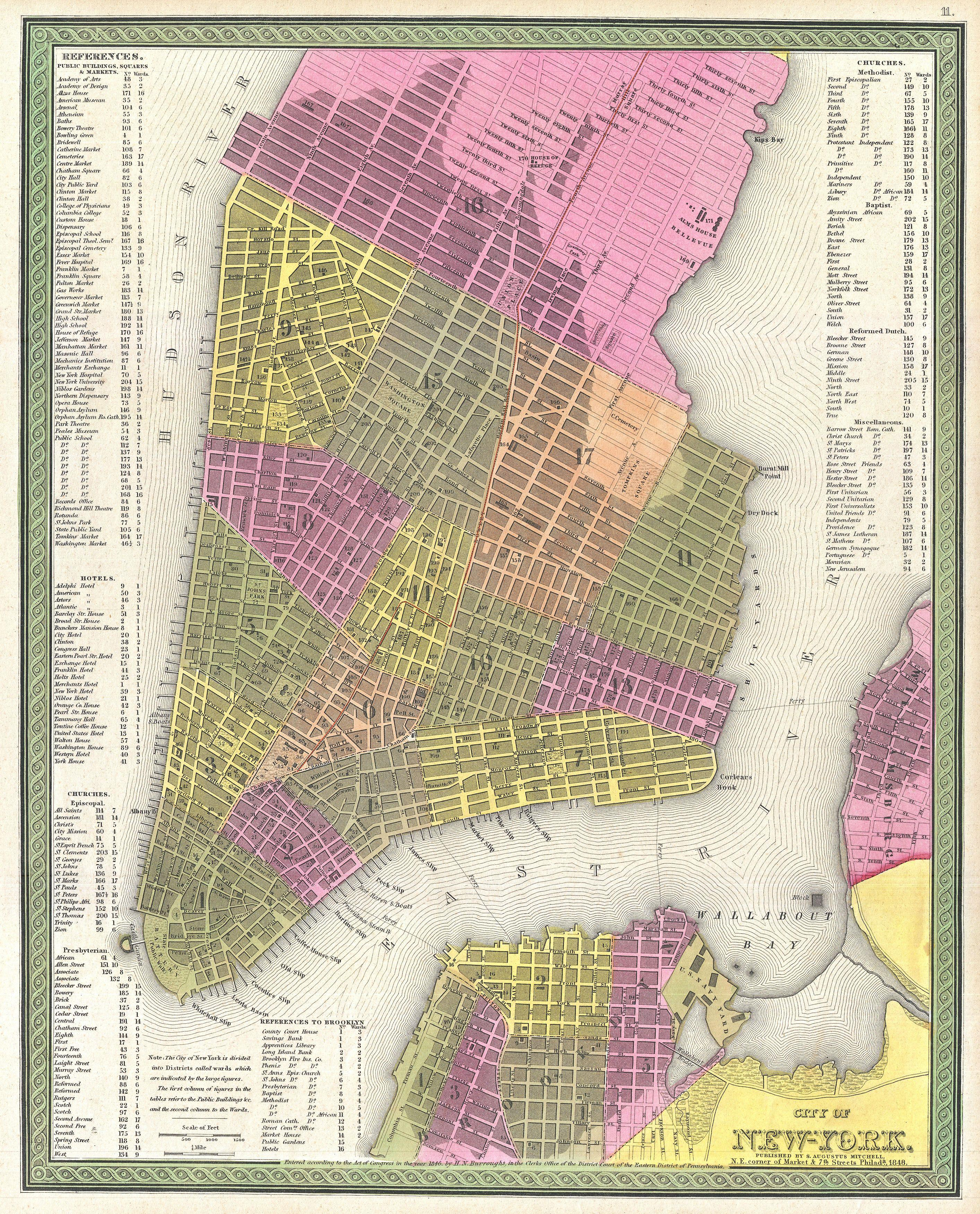
1848

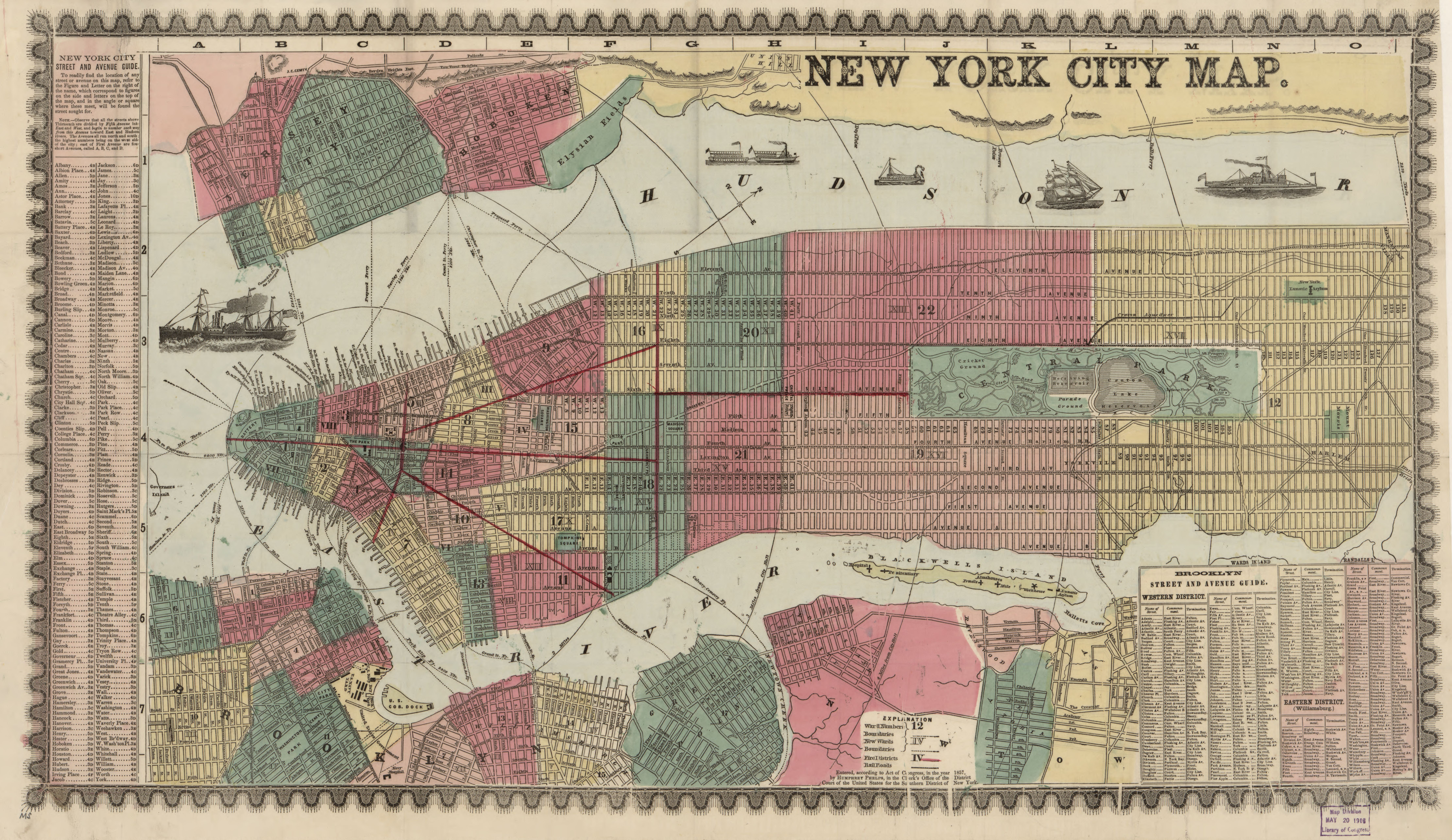
1862

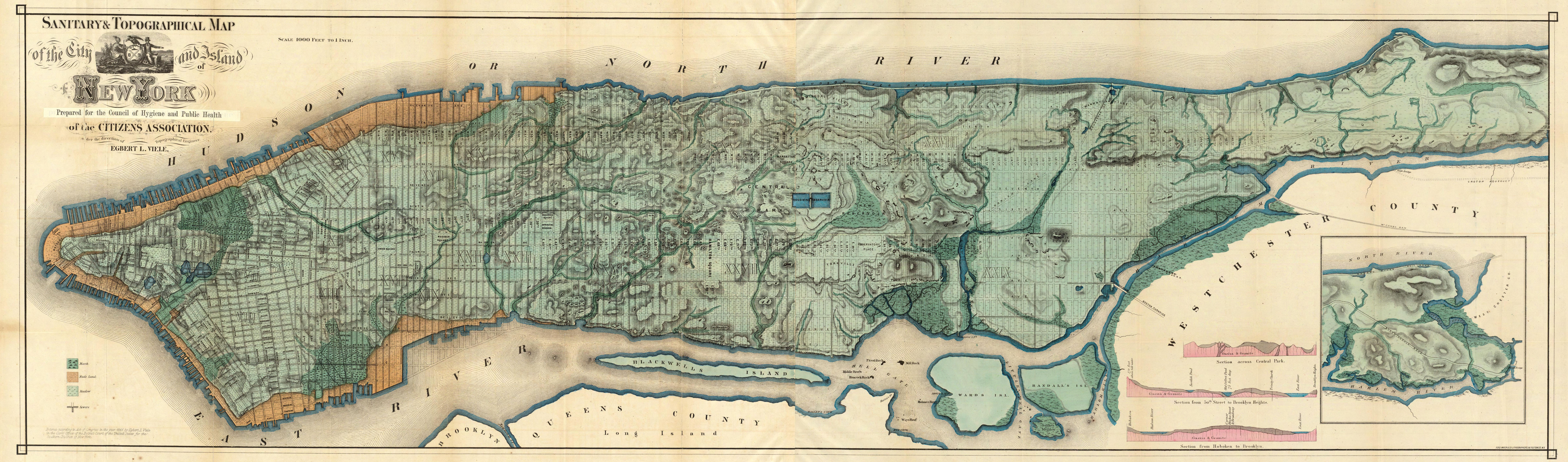
1865

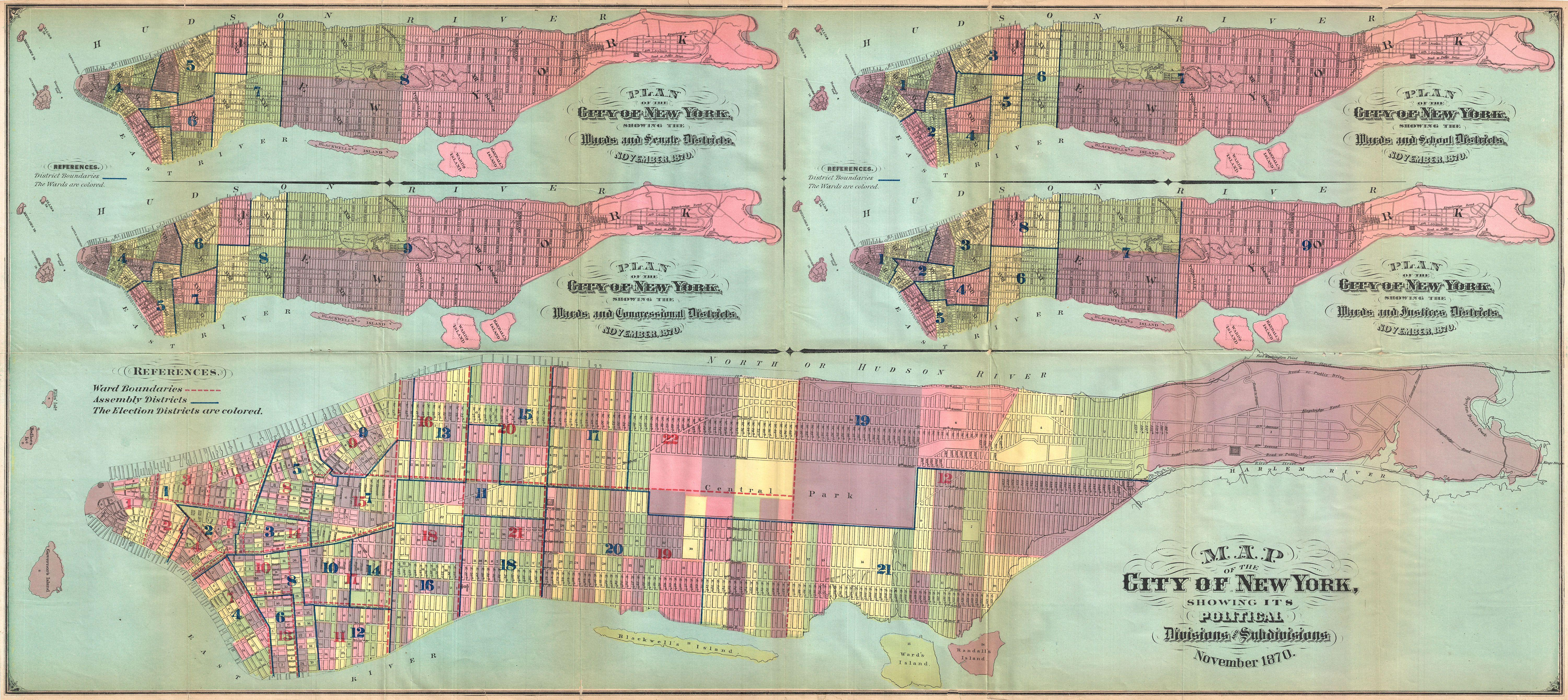
1870

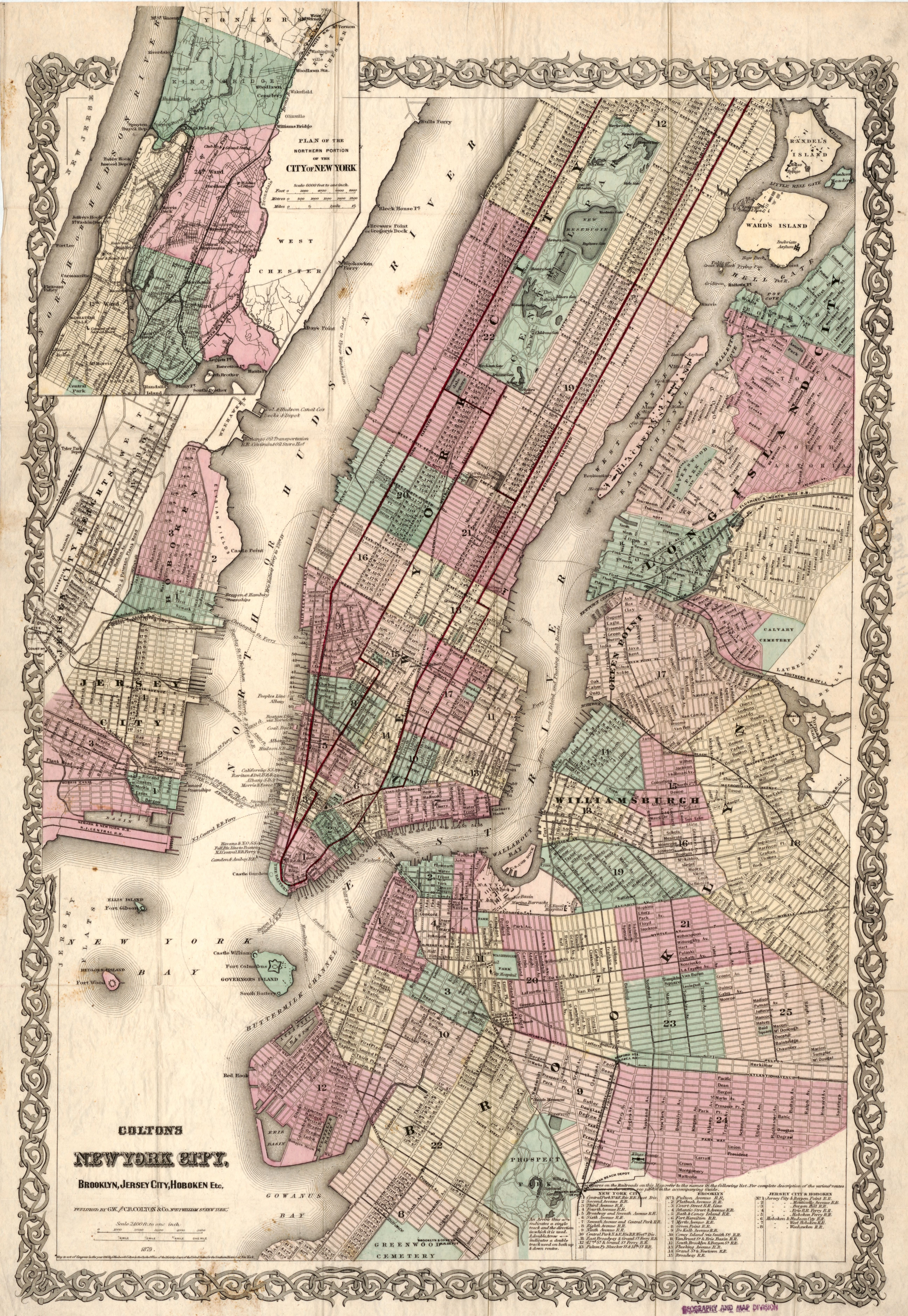
1879

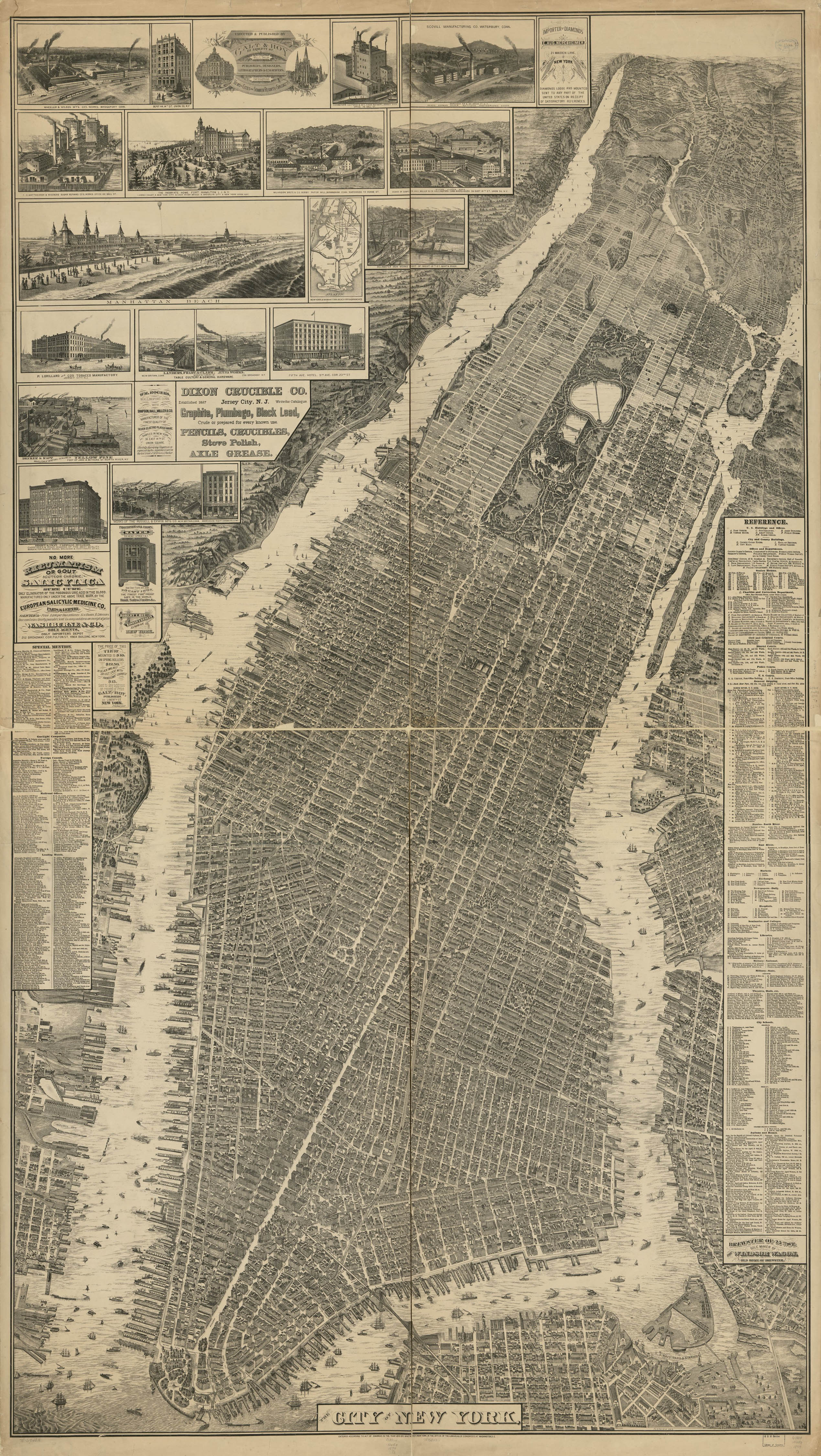
1879

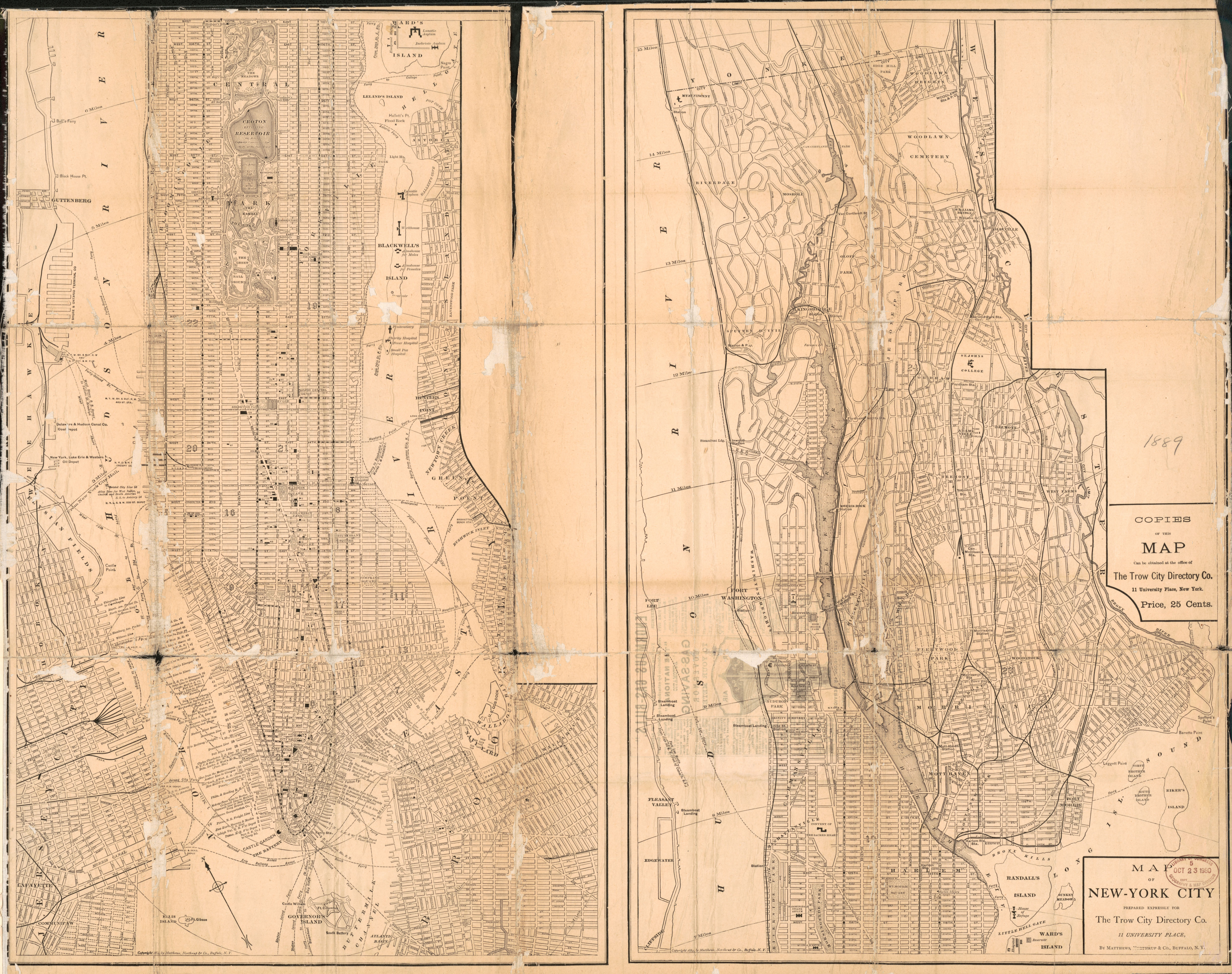
1889

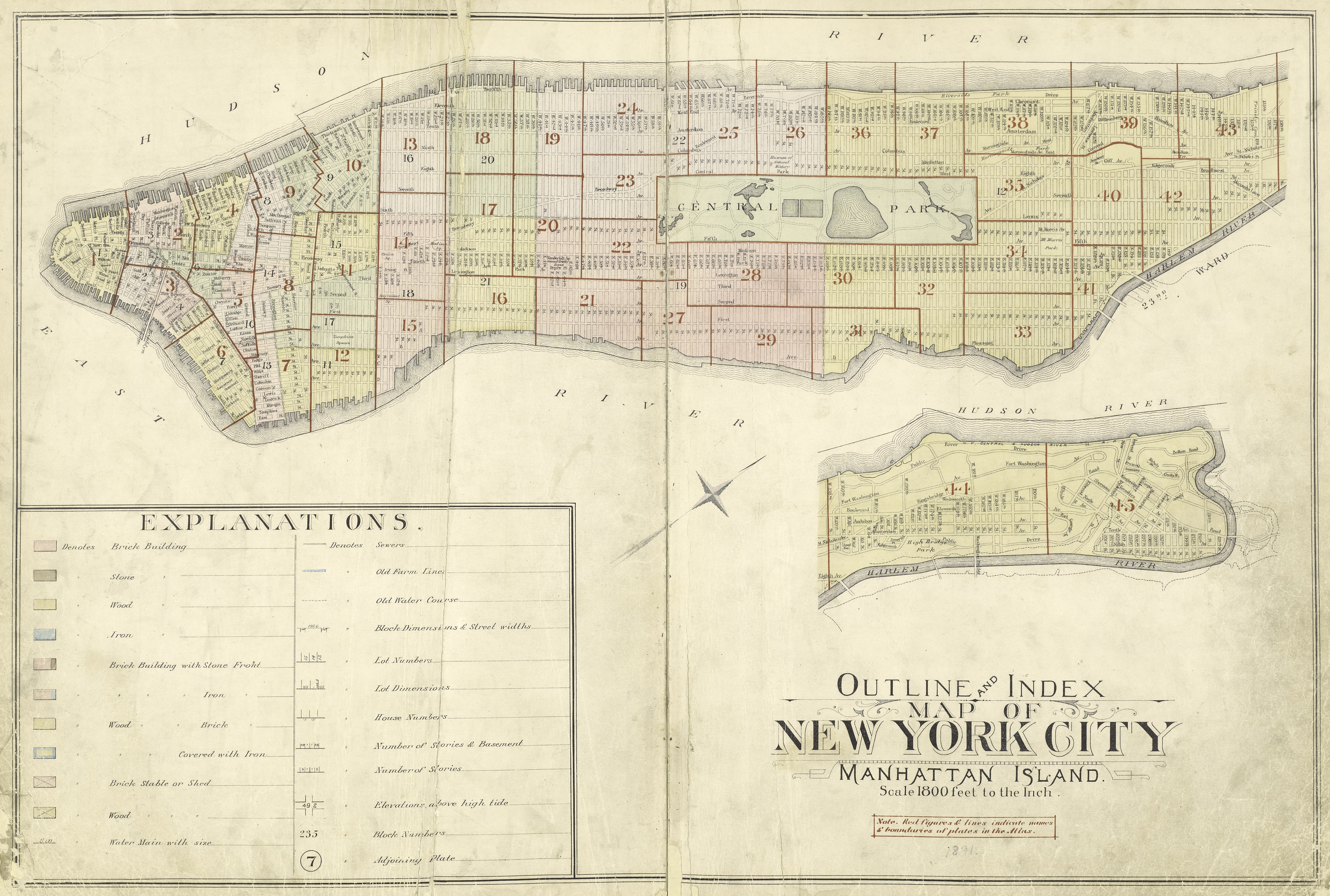
1891

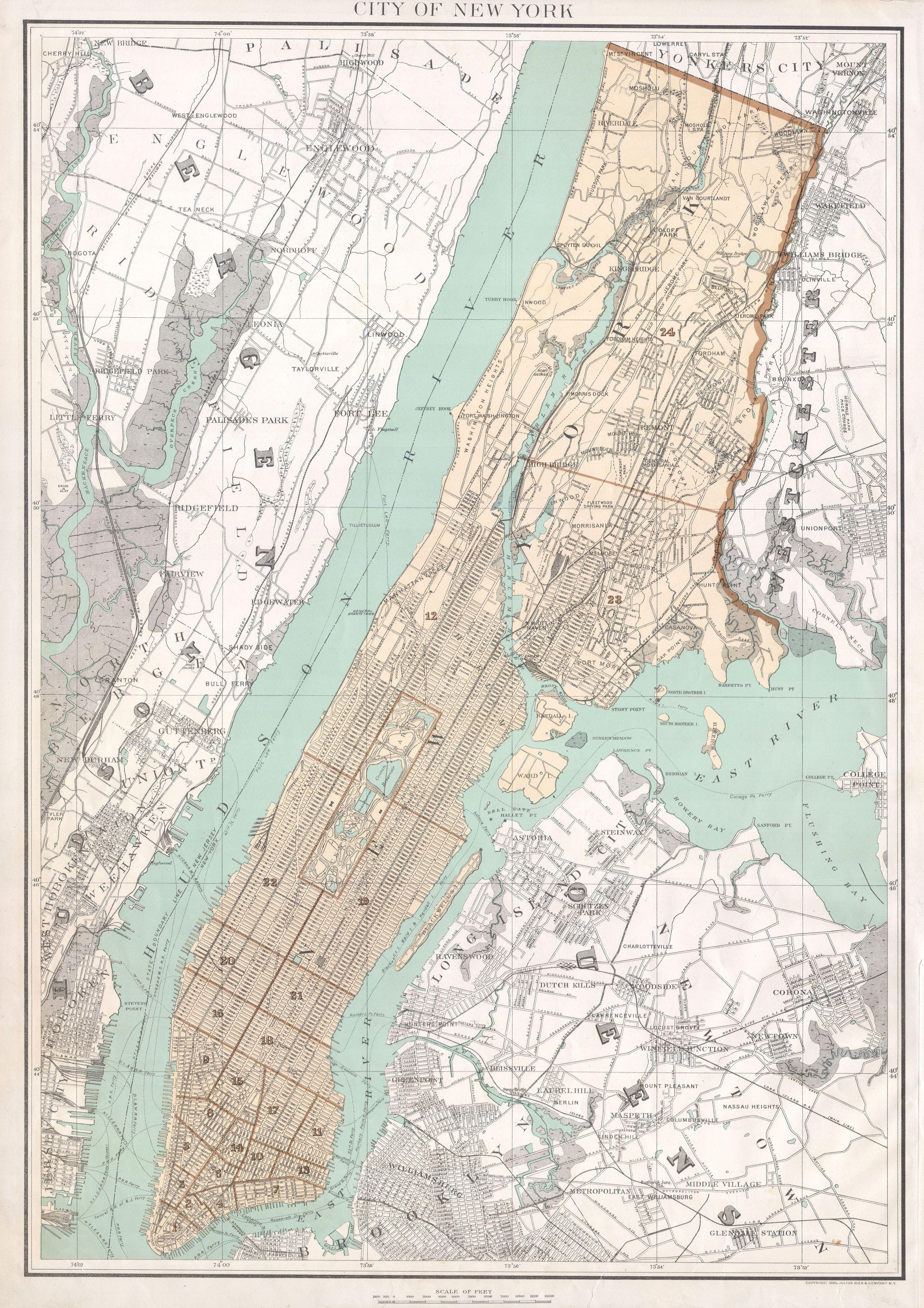
1895

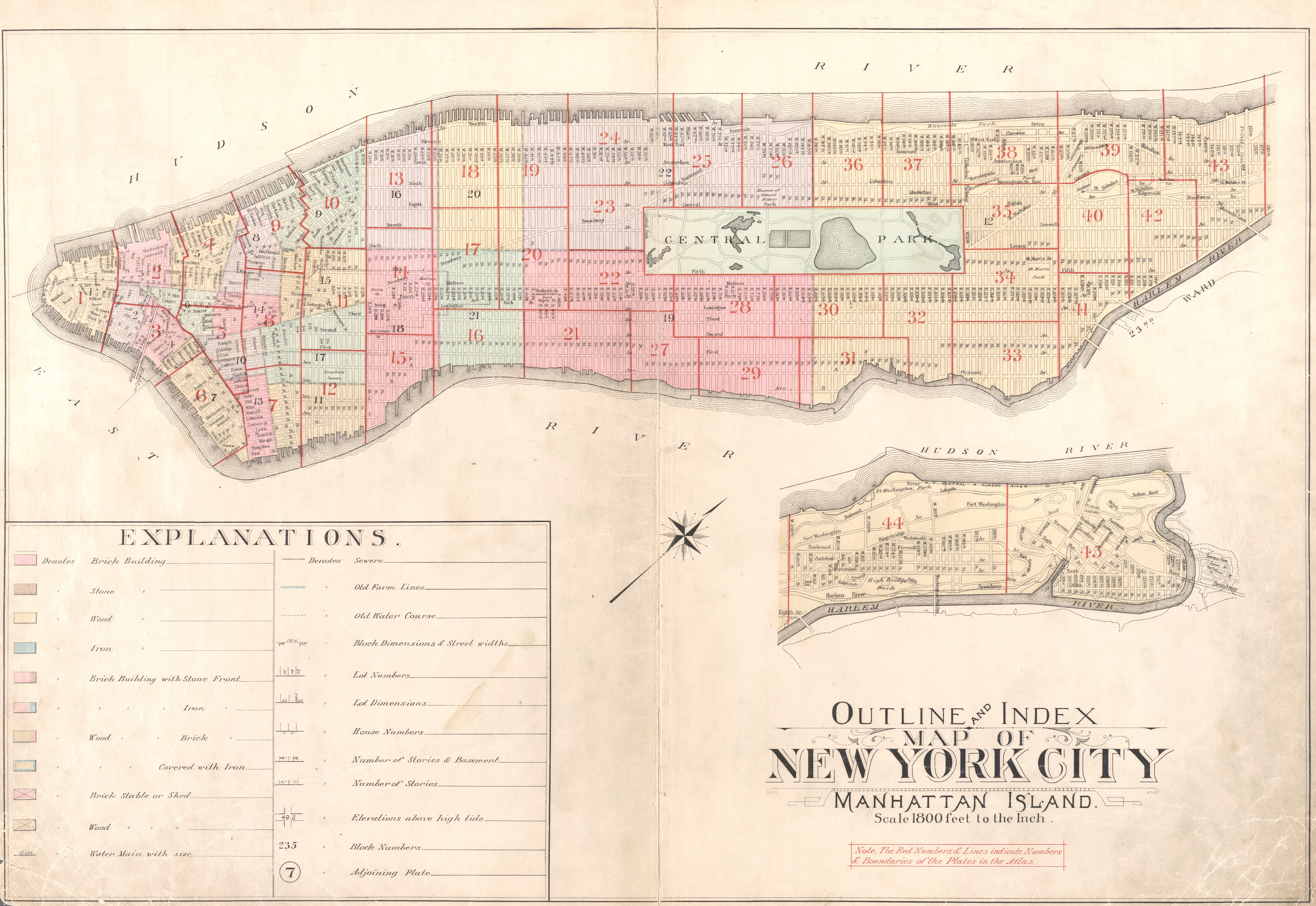
1897

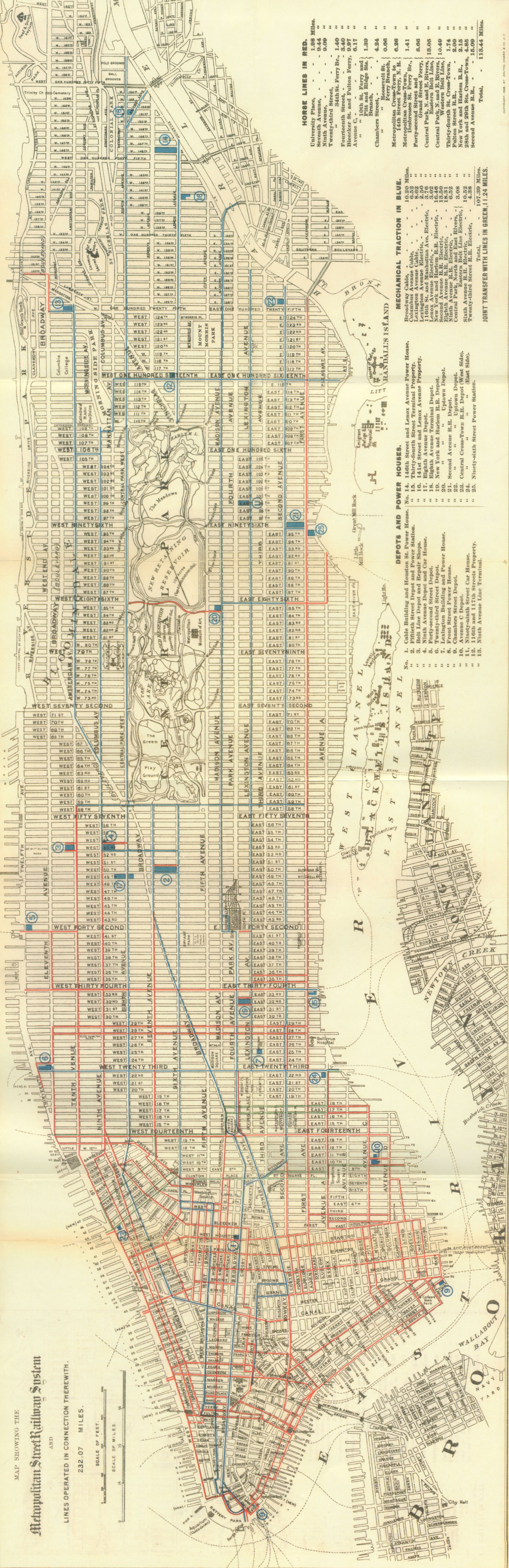
1899

=== 20th century ===
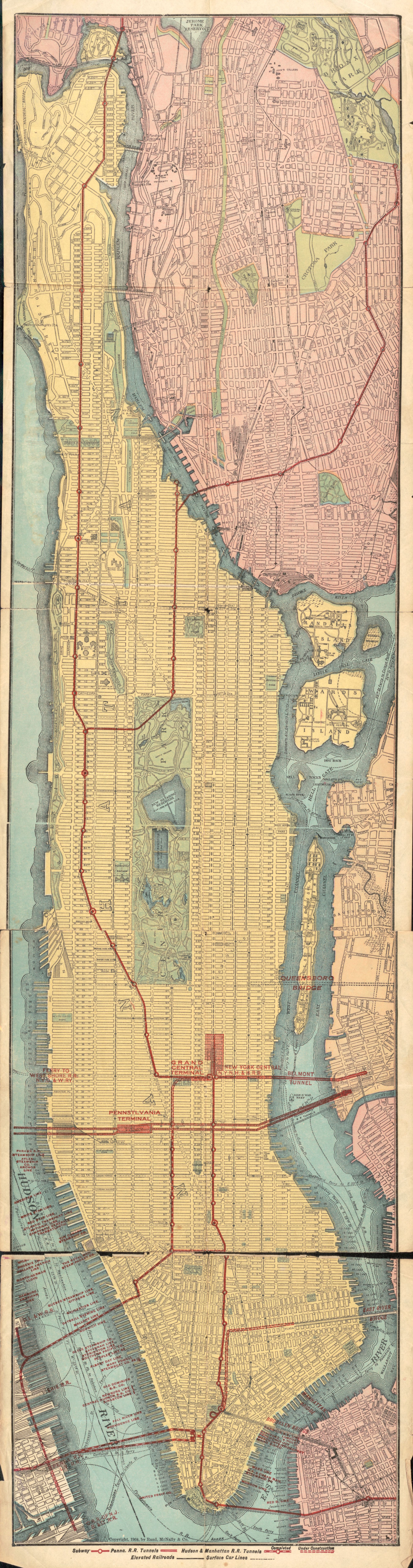
1908

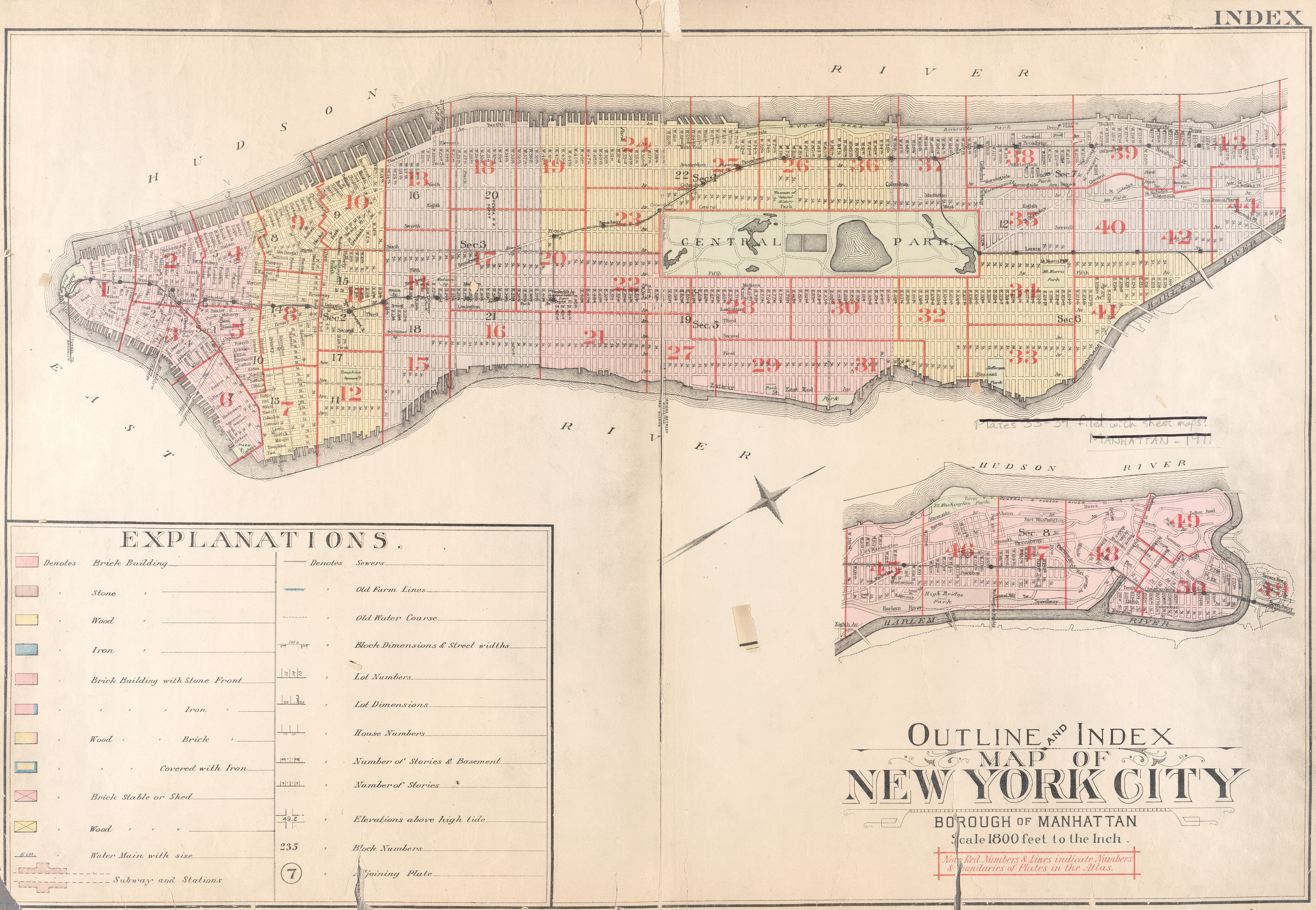
1911

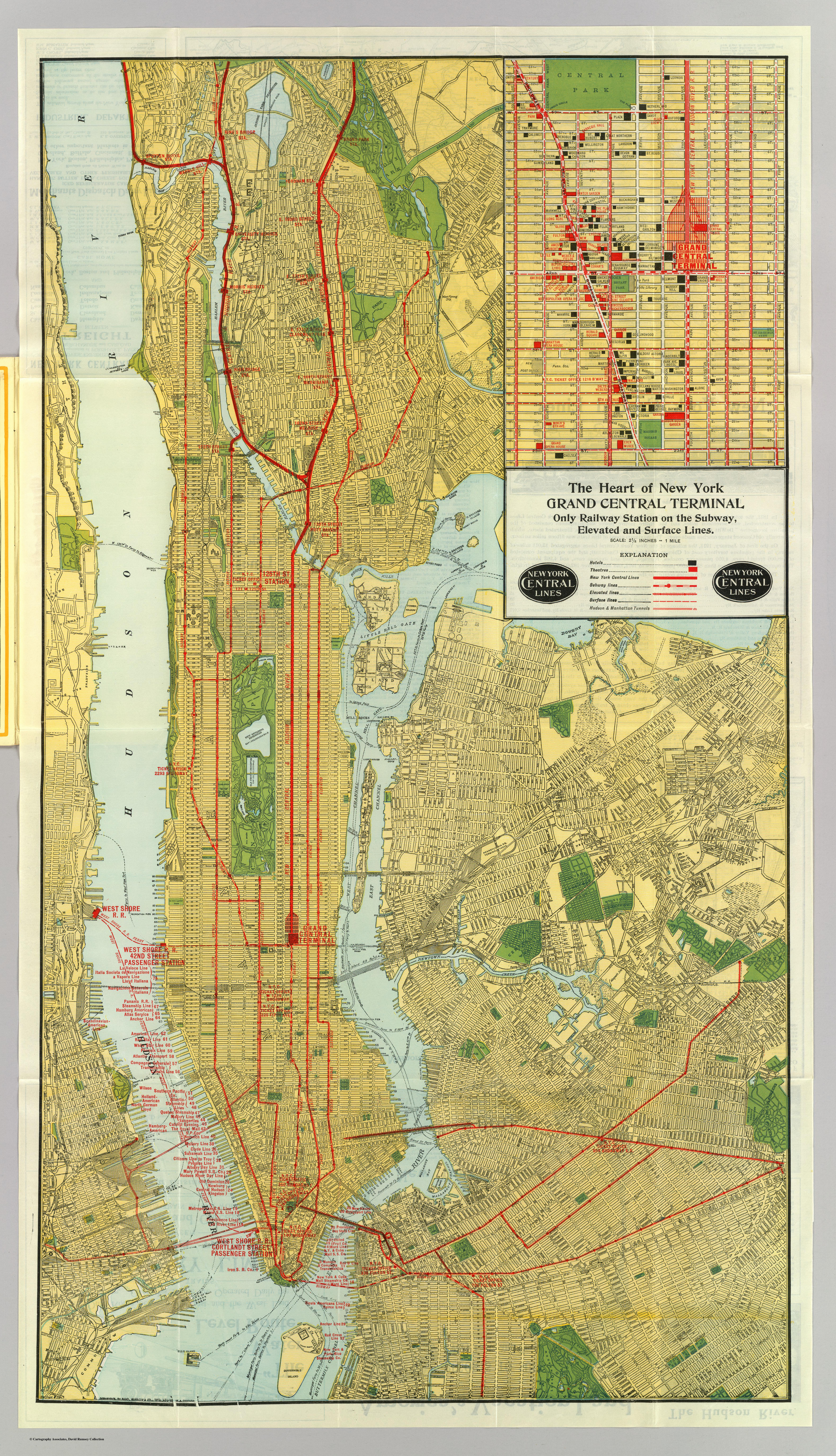
1918

1921

1960

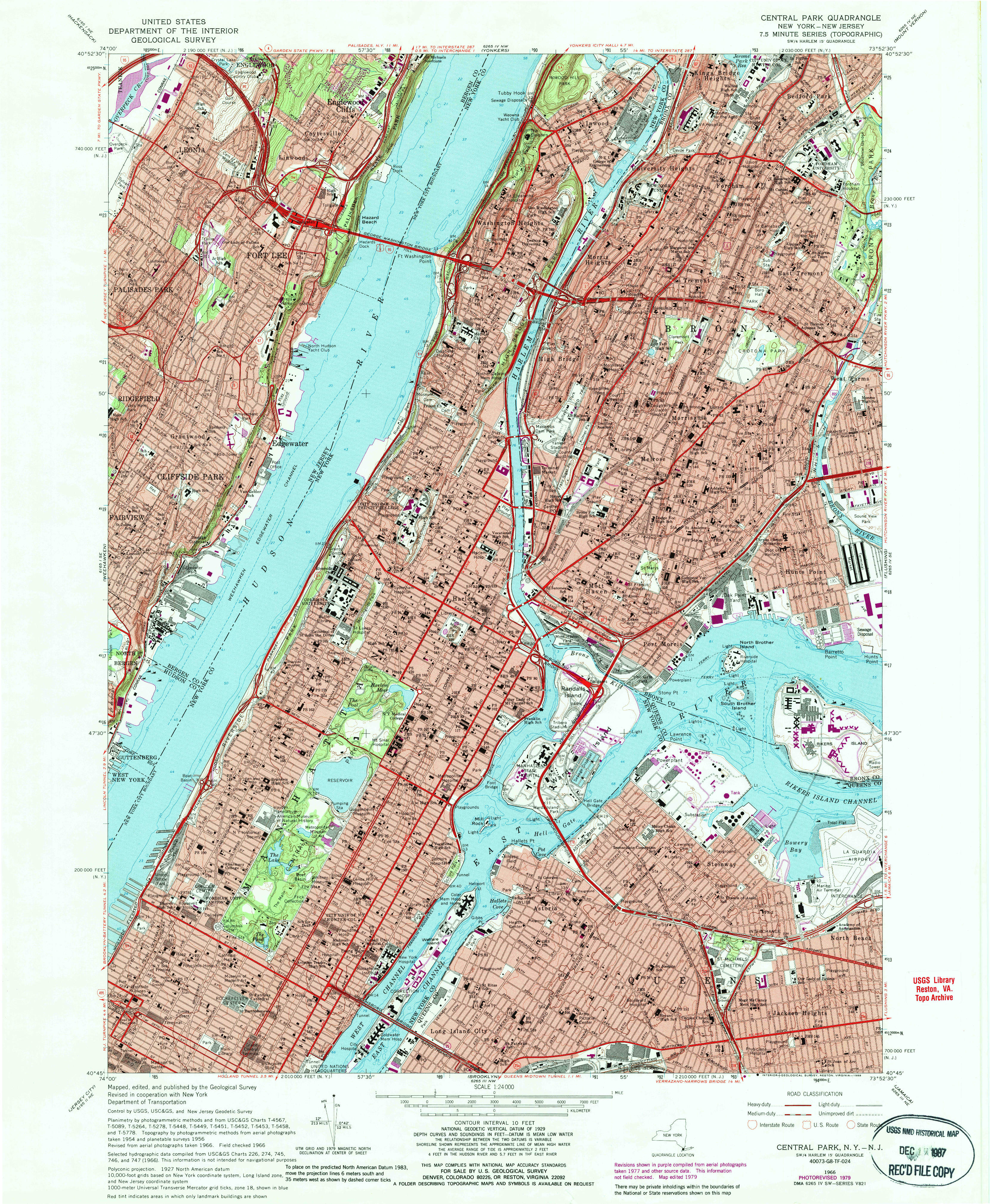
1966-1967 (Center and North)

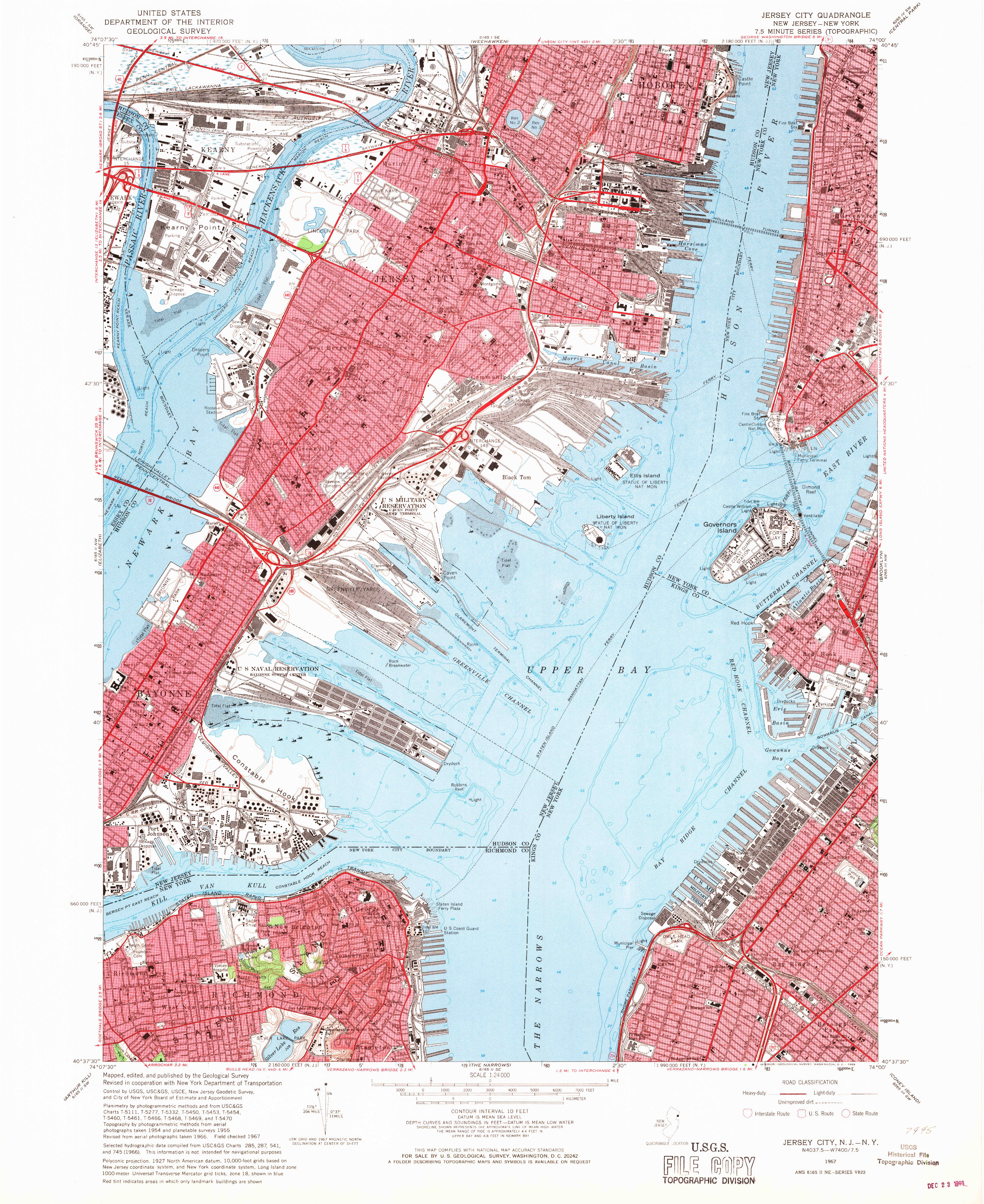
1966-1967 (Southwest)

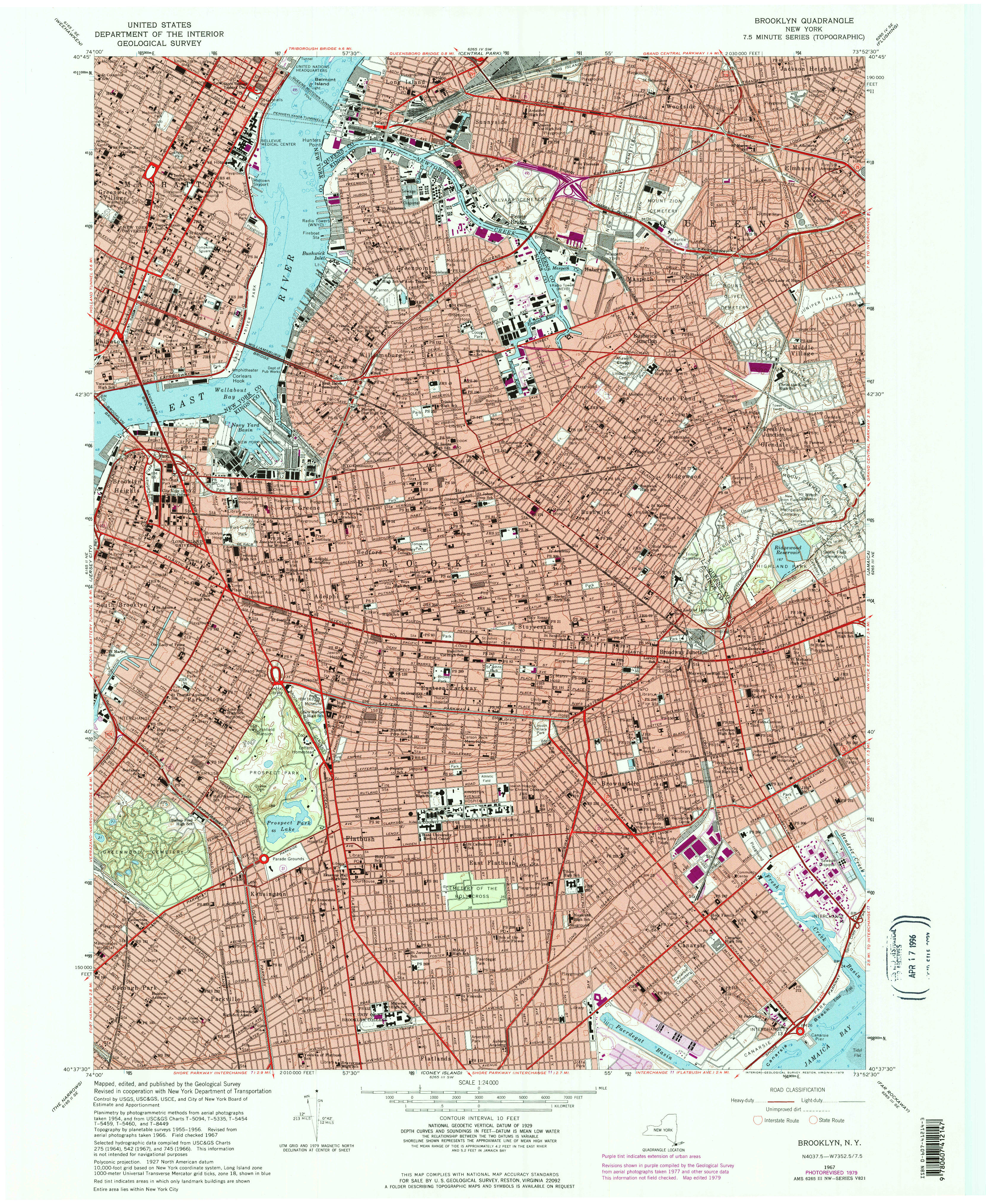
1966-1967 (Southeast)

=== 21st century ===
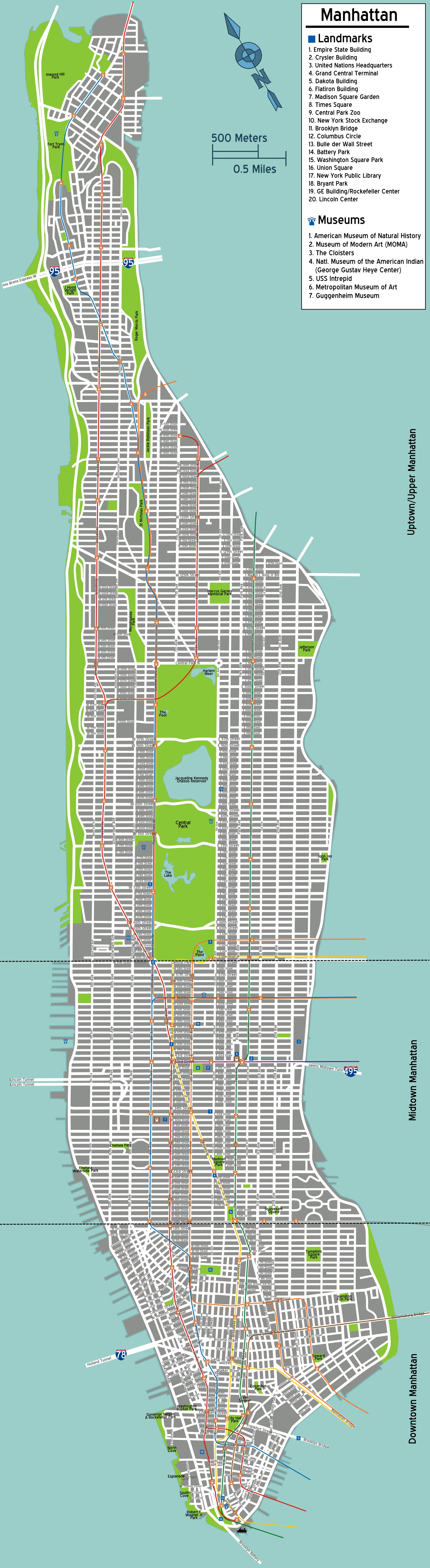
2007

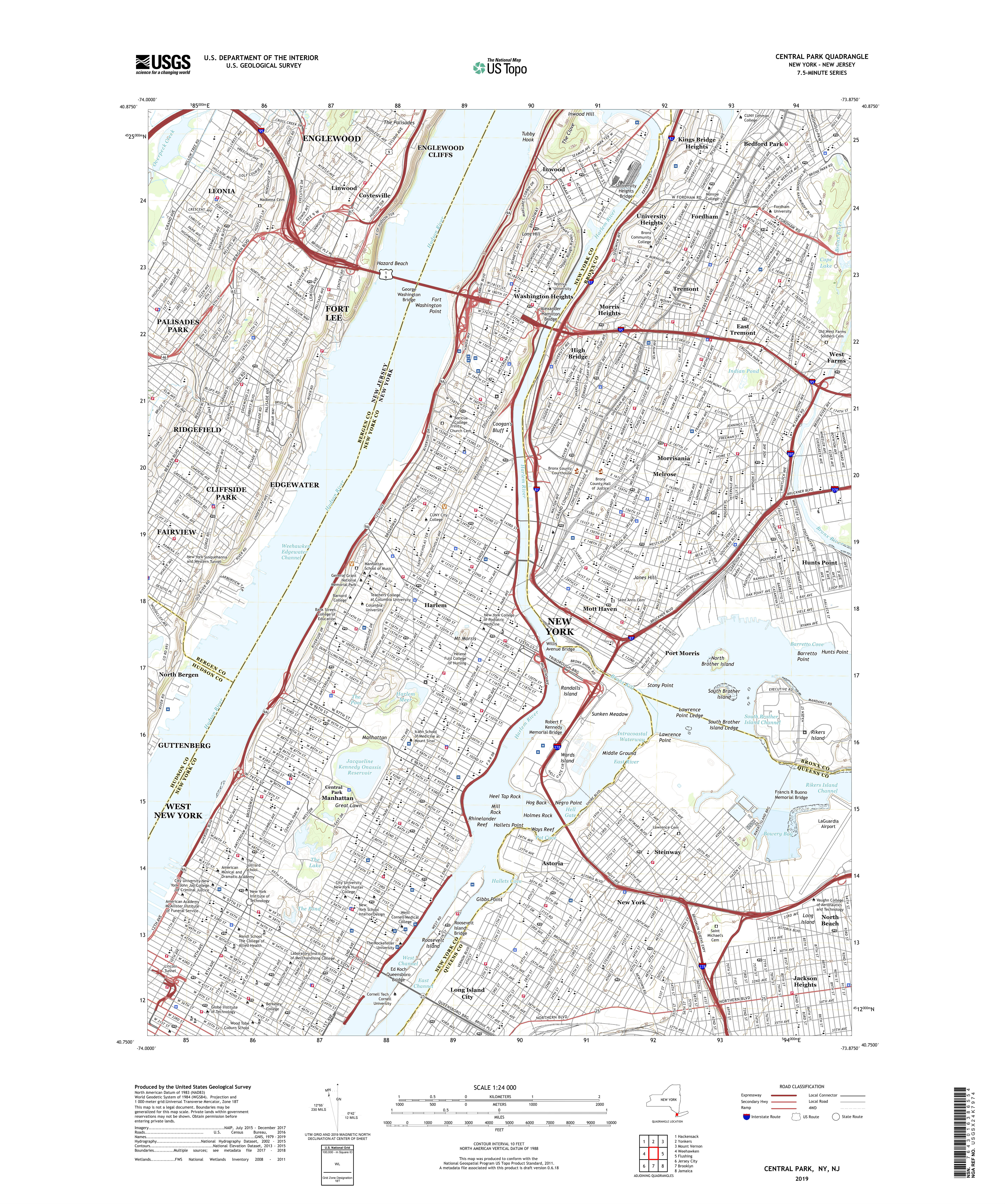
2019 (Center and North)

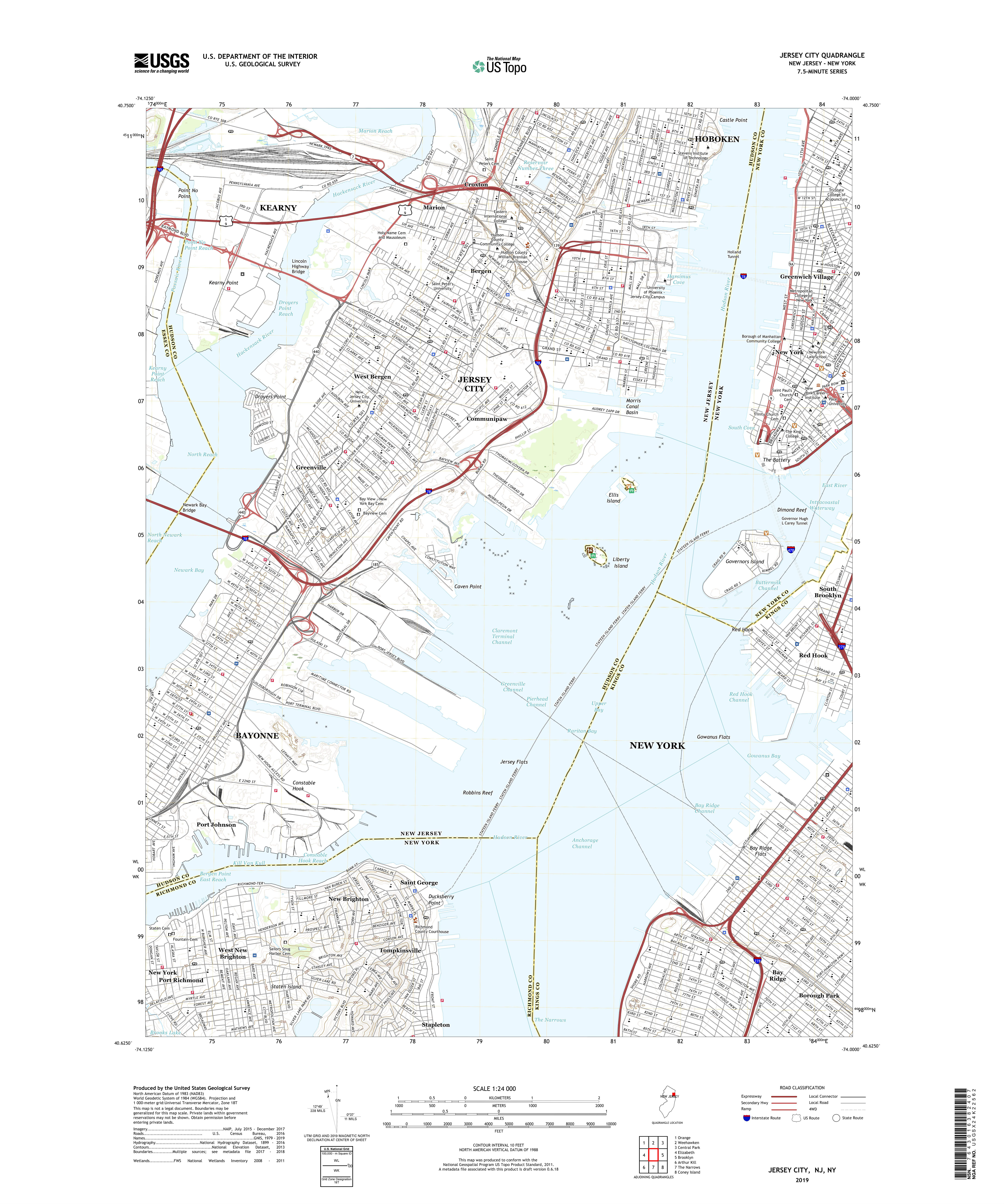
2019 (Southwest)

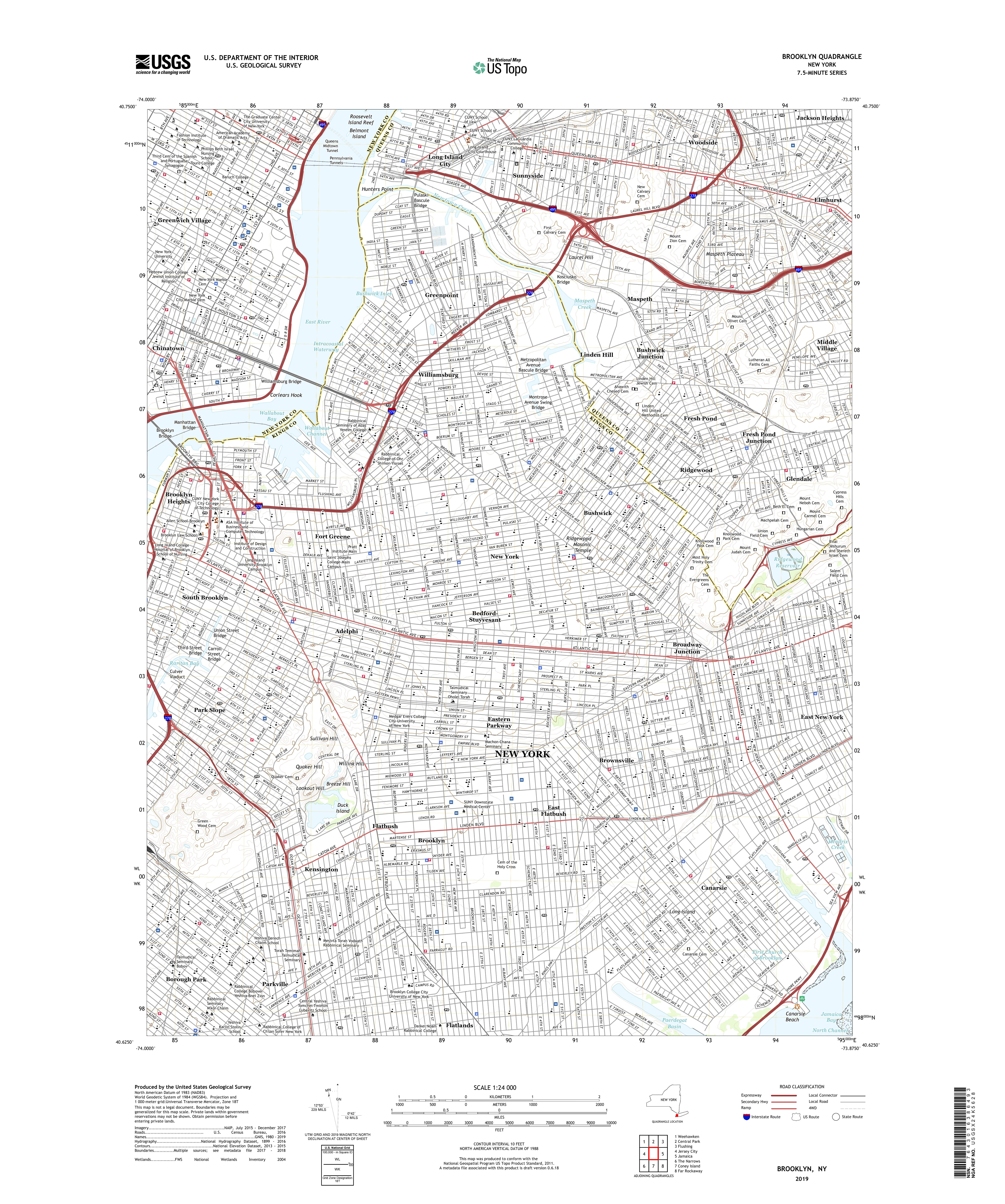
2019 (Southeast)

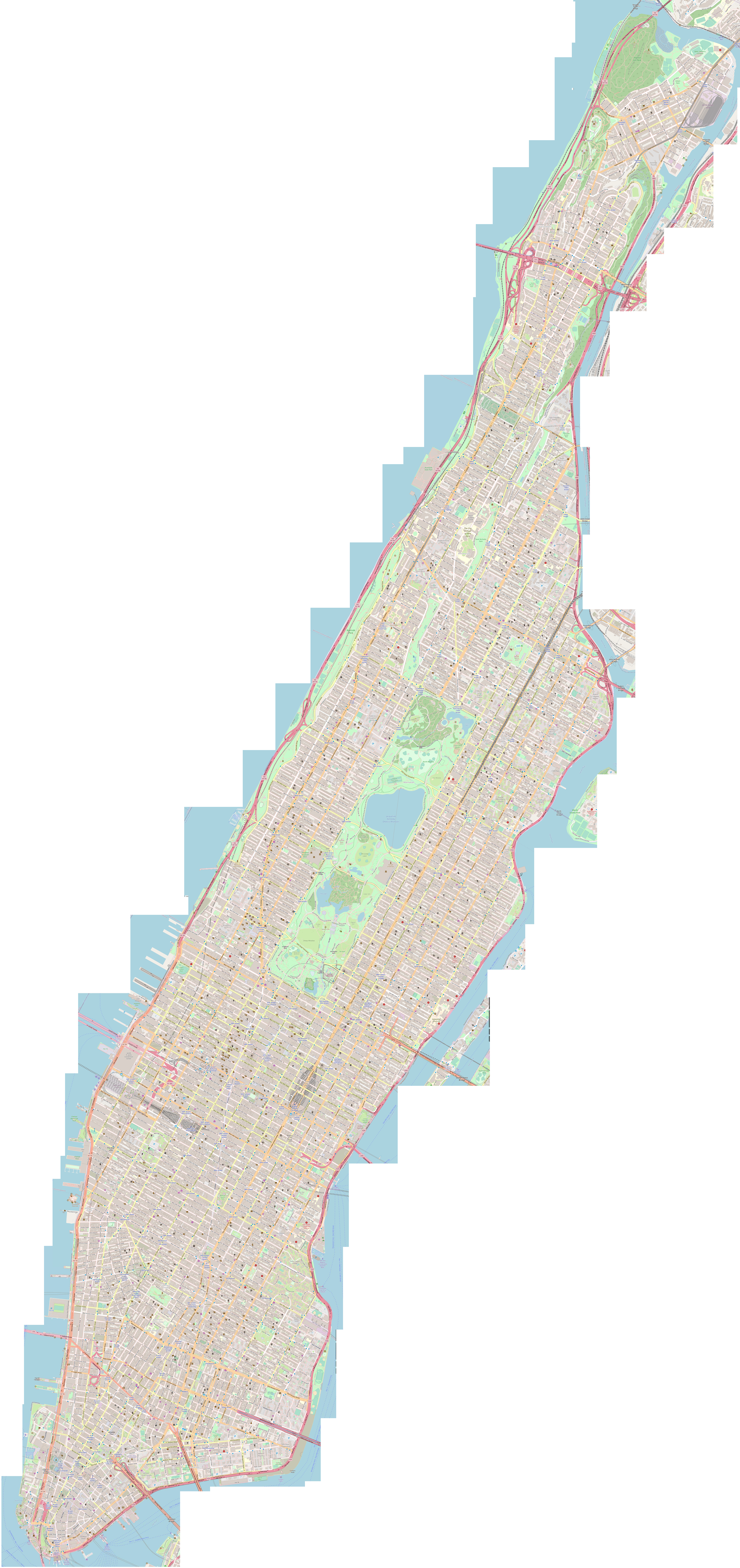
2023

== Murders by year ==
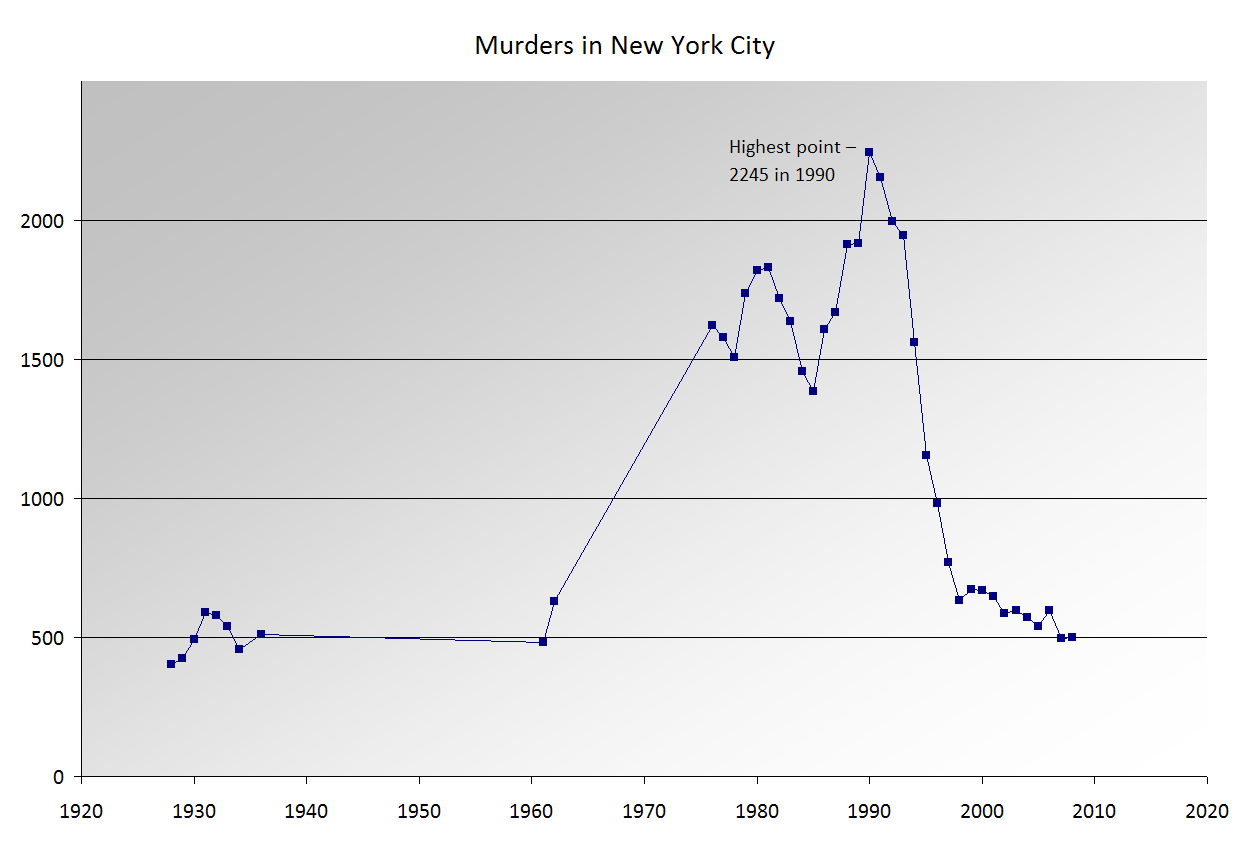
Chart of murders in the NYC area by year

Year	Murders
1928	404 (Note: 1928: First year tabulated.)
1929	425
1930	494
1931	588
1932	579
1933	541
1934	458
1935	n/a
1936	510
1937–1959	n/a
1960	482
1961	483
1962	631
1963	548
1964	636
1965	634
1966	654
1967	746
1968	986
1969	1043
1970	1117
1971	1466
1972	1691
1973	1680
1974	1554
1975	1645
1976	1622
1977	1557
1978	1504
1979	1733
1980	1814
1981	1826
1982	1668
1983	1622
1984	1450
1985	1384
1986	1582
1987	1672
1988	1896
1989	1905
1990	2245 (Note: 1990: Highest total to date.)
1991	2154
1992	1995
1993	1946
1994	1561
1995	1177
1996	983
1997	770
1998	633
1999	671
2000	673
2001	649 (Note: 2001: Not including the September 11 attacks.)
2002	587
2003	597
2004	570
2005	539
2006	596
2007	496
2008	523
2009	471
2010	536
2011	515
2012	419 (Note: 2012: Lowest total since 1928, lowest per capita rate.)
2013	335
2014	333
2015	352
2016	335
2017	292
2018	295
2019	319
2020	468
2021	488
2022	438
2023	391
2024	377

== See also ==
- History of New York City
- List of incidents of civil unrest in New York City
- List of mayors of New York City
- List of ticker-tape parades in New York City

=== Borough specific ===
- List of New York City Designated Landmarks in Manhattan
- National Register of Historic Places listings in New York County, New York
- Timeline of the Bronx
- List of New York City Designated Landmarks in the Bronx
- National Register of Historic Places listings in Bronx County, New York
- Timeline of Brooklyn
- List of New York City Designated Landmarks in Brooklyn
- National Register of Historic Places listings in Kings County, New York
- Timeline of Queens
- List of New York City Designated Landmarks in Queens
- National Register of Historic Places listings in Queens County, New York
- Timeline of Staten Island
- List of New York City Designated Landmarks in Staten Island
- National Register of Historic Places listings in Richmond County, New York

=== Outside of the city ===
- Sister city timelines: Brasília, Budapest, Cairo, Jerusalem, Johannesburg, London, Madrid, Rome, Santo Domingo, Tokyo
- Timelines of other cities in New York state: Buffalo, Saratoga Springs

== Bibliography ==
Published in the 19th century

- W. Williams (1849). Appletons' New York City and Vicinity Guide. New York: D. Appleton & Company.
- George Henry Townsend (1867). "New York". A Manual of Dates (2nd ed.). London: Frederick Warne & Co.
- Hough, Franklin B. (1872). "New York City". Gazetteer of the State of New York. Albany, N.Y: Andrew Boyd. OCLC 18450990.
- John Bostwick Moreau (1881), Events in the History of New York City, OL 19367519M
- Sabin, Joseph, ed. (1881). "New York City". Bibliotheca Americana. Vol. 13. New York. OCLC 13972268.
- Appleton's Dictionary of New York. D. Appleton and Co. 1898.
- "Chronology of New York". Greater New York. New York: Evening Post Publishing Co. 1898.
- Levy, Florence N., ed. (1899). "New York Galleries (etc.)". American Art Annual 1898. Vol. 1. NY: Macmillan. pp. 214–313. hdl:2027/uc1.b3063382.
- Maud Wilder Goodwin; et al., eds. (1899). Historic New York. New York: G.P. Putnam's Sons.

Published in the 20th century

- "New York City", Chambers's Encyclopaedia, London: W. & R. Chambers, 1901
- "Chronological History of Manhattan", Tourist's Hand-Book of New York, New York: Historical Press, 1905
- "New York", Jewish Encyclopedia, vol. 9, New York: Funk & Wagnalls, 1907, hdl:2027/osu.32435029752862
- Vincent, Benjamin (1910), "New York", Haydn's Dictionary of Dates (25th ed.), London: Ward, Lock & Co.
- Andrew Cunningham McLaughlin and Albert Bushnell Hart, ed. (1914). "New York City". Cyclopedia of American Government. Vol. 2. D. Appleton and Company.
- "Chronology". High Schools of New York City. High School Teachers Association of New York City. 1921.
- Federal Writers' Project (1939). New York City Guide. American Guide Series. New York: Random House.
- Federal Writers' Project (1940). "Chronology". New York: a Guide to the Empire State. American Guide Series. New York: Oxford University Press. hdl:2027/mdp.39015008915889.
- Claude Edwin Heaton (1946). "Yellow Fever in New York City". Bull Med Libr Assoc. 34 (2): 67–78. PMC 194570. PMID 16016720.
- Furer, Howard B., ed. (1974), New York: a Chronological & Documentary History, 1524–1970, American Cities Chronology Series, Dobbs Ferry, N.Y.: Oceana Publications, ISBN 0-379-00610-3
- Holli, Melvin G., and Jones, Peter d'A., eds. Biographical Dictionary of American Mayors, 1820-1980 (Greenwood Press, 1981) short scholarly biographies each of the city's mayors 1820 to 1980. online; see index at p. 410 for list.
- Wetterau, Bruce (1990), New York Public Library Book of Chronologies, New York: Prentice Hall, ISBN 0-13-620451-1, OL 1885709M
- Janowitz, Meta F. (1993). "Indian Corn and Dutch Pots: Seventeenth-Century Foodways in New Amsterdam/New York". Historical Archaeology. 27 (2): 6–24. doi:10.1007/BF03374170. JSTOR 25616236. S2CID 160127551.
- Melissa McRaney Good (1995), New York Diary, Philadelphia: Old City Books, ISBN 0-9646192-0-2, OL 818803M
- Mushabac, Jane; Wigan, Angela (1999). A Short and Remarkable History of New York City. Fordham University Press. p. 17. ISBN 978-0-8232-1985-8.
- Southern, Eileen (1997). Music of Black Americans. New York: W.W. Norton & Co. ISBN 0-393-03843-2.

Published in the 21st century

- Ault, Julie, ed. (2002). "Chronology of selected alternative structures, spaces, artists' groups, and organizations in New York City, 1965–85". Alternative Art, New York, 1965–1985. University of Minnesota Press. ISBN 978-0-8166-3794-2.
- Kroessler, Jeffrey A. (2002), New York Year by Year: A Chronology of the Great Metropolis, New York University Press, ISBN 0-8147-4751-5
- Trager, James (2003). New York Chronology. HarperCollins. ISBN 978-0-06-201860-1.
- Homberger, Eric (2005). "Chronology". Historical Atlas of New York City (2nd ed.). Henry Holt and Company. pp. 170–181. ISBN 978-0-8050-7842-8.
- Mitchell, Chris (January 7, 2008), "What Would It Take to Get New York City's Murder Rate to Zero? (The Killing of Murder: As the homicide rate continues to drop, the impossible beckons: What would it take to go all the way to zero?)", New York, archived from the original on November 2, 2012
- Kenneth T. Jackson, ed. (2010). Encyclopedia of New York City (2nd ed.). Yale University Press. ISBN 978-0-300-18257-6. (+ 1st ed., 1995, via Internet Archive)
- Seaver, Barry W. (2010). "Rebecca Rankin's Campaign for a Municipal Archives in New York, 1920–1952". Libraries & the Cultural Record. 45 (3): 263–296. doi:10.1353/lac.2010.0012. JSTOR 25750344. S2CID 142742848.
- Smith, Andrew F. (2013). New York City: A Food Biography. Rowman & Littlefield Publishers. ISBN 978-1-4422-2713-2. Includes Chronology.
- Roberts, Sam (2014). History of New York in 101 Objects. Simon and Schuster. ISBN 978-1-4767-2880-3.
