= George Floyd protests in New York City =

2020 civil unrest in New York City after the murder of George Floyd

- Part of George Floyd protests in New York state and Black Lives Matter protests in New York City
- Beginning of a march
- Date: May 28, 2020 - May 29, 2021
- Location: New York City
- Caused by: Reaction to the murder of George Floyd; Economic, racial and social inequality

Protests took place at several sites in each of the five New York City boroughs, starting on May 28, 2020, in reaction to the murder of George Floyd. Most of the protests were peaceful, while some sites experienced protester and/or police violence, including several high-profile incidents of excessive force. Looting became a parallel issue, especially in Manhattan. As a result, and amid the COVID-19 pandemic, the city was placed under curfew from June 1–7, the first curfew in the city since dual racial/war protest riots in 1943.

The protests catalyzed efforts at police reform, leading to the criminalization of chokeholds during arrests, the repeal of 50-a, which had kept police disciplinary records confidential. Several murals and memorials were created around the city in George Floyd's honor, and demonstrations against racial violence and police brutality continued as part of the larger Black Lives Matter movement in New York City.

== Background ==
Interactive map of George Floyd protests with more than 100 participants in New York City

On May 25, 2020, George Floyd, an African-American man, was killed in an attempted arrest by a white police officer in Minneapolis, Minnesota. A video of the incident, depicting the officer kneeling on Floyd's neck for an extended period, attracted widespread outrage leading to local, national, and international protests and demonstrations.

In New York City, reactions to the incident drew comparisons to Eric Garner, who died after being put in a chokehold by police in Staten Island in 2014, likewise sparking a national outcry and becoming a major event in the Black Lives Matter movement. Garner's mother, Gwen Carr, participated in several of the demonstrations after the murder of George Floyd. The New York Police Department has been the subject of frequent criticism for its treatment of black citizens, including use of racial profiling, its stop-and-frisk program, high-profile cases of police violence, and the use of mass arrests and other aggressive tactics against protesters.

== Timeline ==
=== Initial protests (May 28–30) ===
On May 28, nearly 100 protesters assembled in Union Square and marched to City Hall, blocking traffic in Lower Manhattan. While mostly peaceful, there were conflicts between protesters and police, leading to dozens of arrests as protesters threw objects and an officer was punched in the face. Peaceful protests continued the next day, May 29, around Foley Square in Manhattan. Another group came together around the Adam Clayton Powell Jr. State Office Building in Harlem. As the day went on, the protests became more violent. Groups moved to the Manhattan District Attorney's office and then over the Brooklyn Bridge.

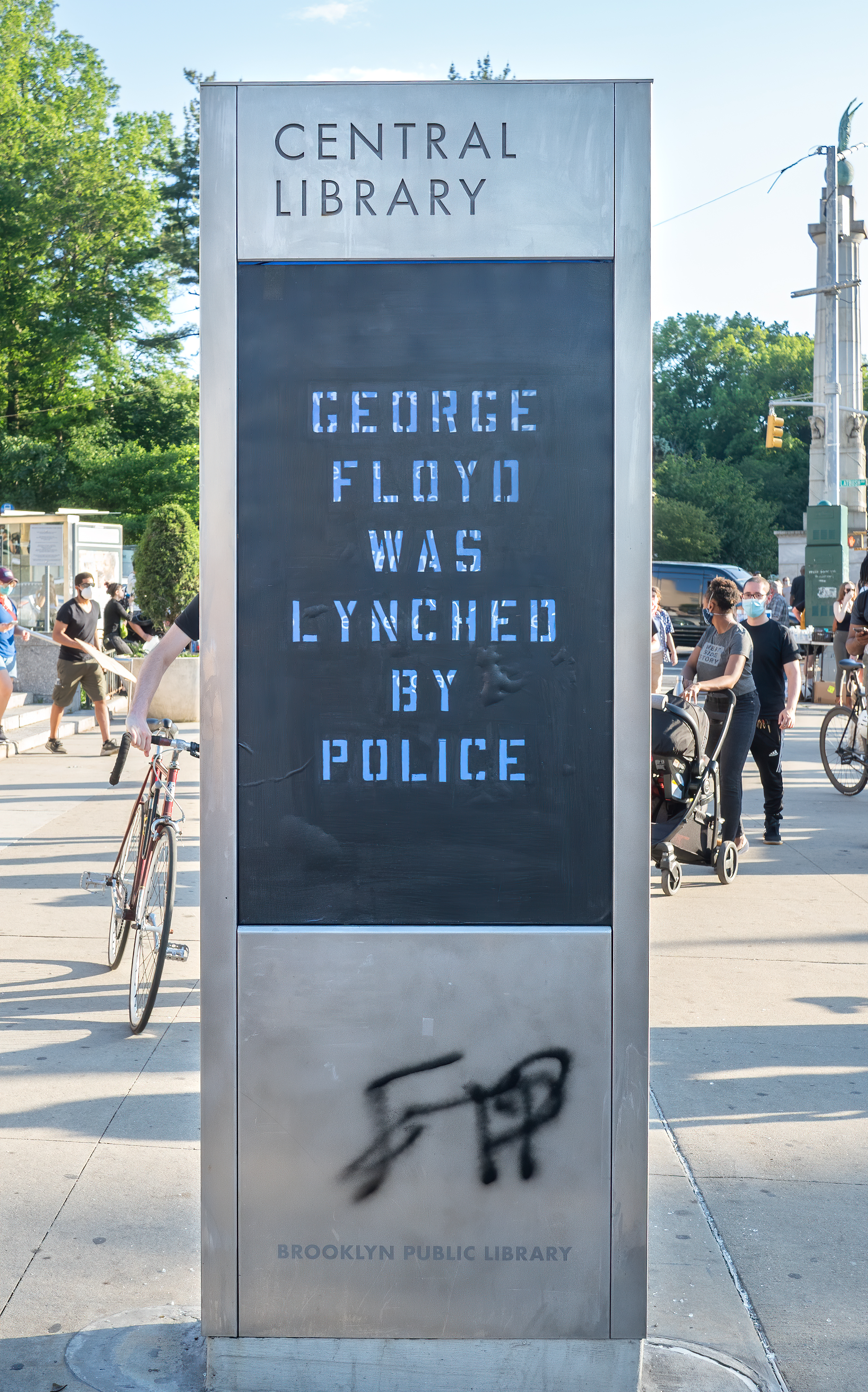
Protesters placed a stencil over the Central Brooklyn Public Library digital sign which reads "George Floyd was lynched by police"

At Barclays Center, there were several clashes between protesters and law enforcement. In this and other protests, participants chanted or held signs bearing the names of other victims of police violence. In nearby Fort Greene Park, protesters were pepper sprayed and tackled by police. More than 500 protesters demonstrated around the 88th Precinct, and others were arrested attempting to break into the 79th Precinct in Bedford–Stuyvesant. Some protesters threw bricks, bottles, and other objects at the police.

Groups of police pushed and struck demonstrators with batons, and used pepper spray on others, including assemblywoman Diana Richardson and New York State Senator Zellnor Myrie. Videos posted online appeared to show demonstrators being beaten and punched by police officers. One video, depicting an officer in Brooklyn shoving a young woman who subsequently suffered a concussion. The incident led to an NYPD investigation and the officer was suspended without pay before being charged with misdemeanor assault, criminal mischief, harassment, and menacing. More than 200 people were arrested, mostly for minor charges. The New York Times described the day's events as "largely peaceful demonstrations [which] turned into jarring scenes of flaming debris, stampedes, and looted storefronts". There were also reports of protesters challenging people engaged in looting.

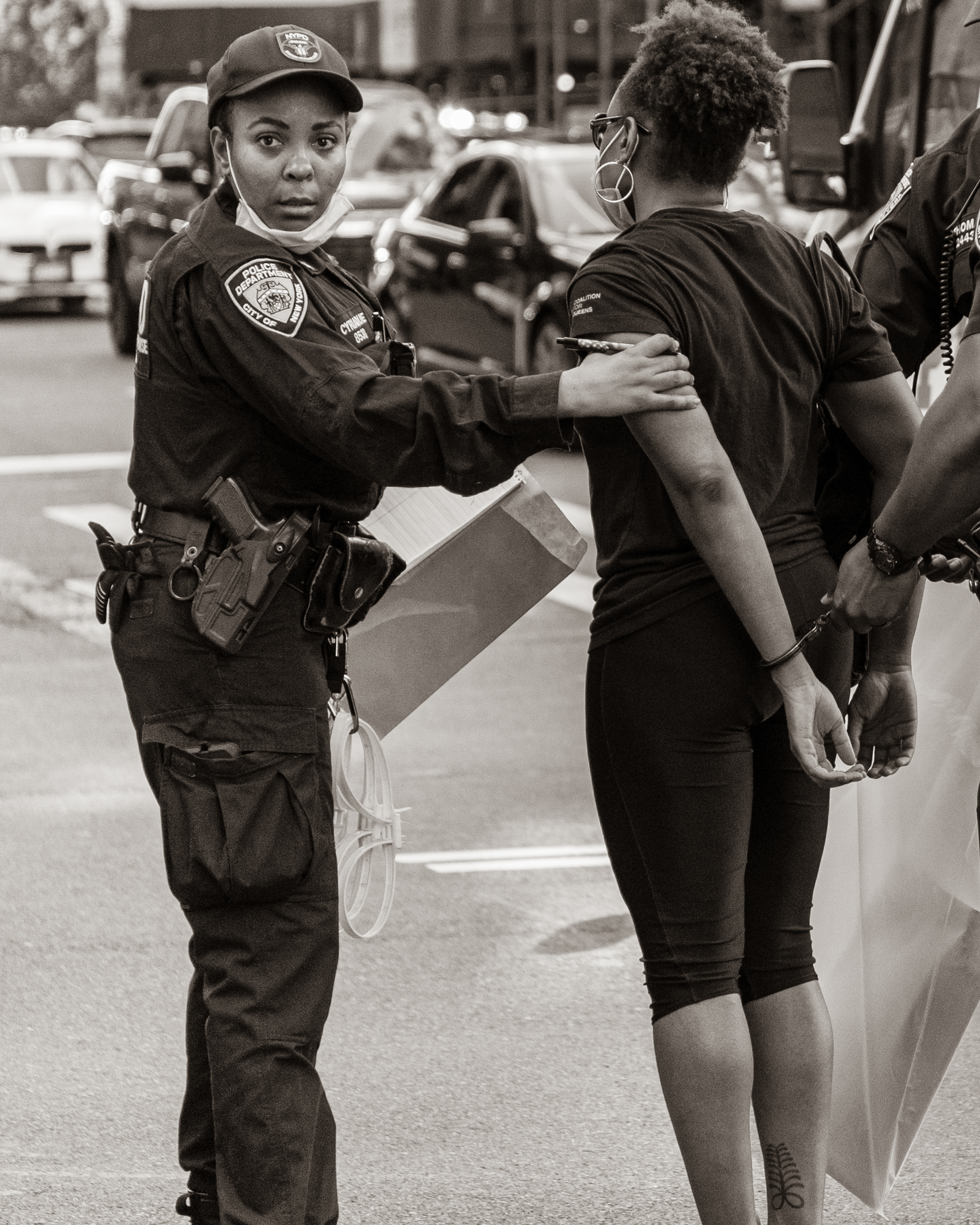
Arrest at Trump Tower in Manhattan on May 30

In the early hours of May 30, a 31-year-old lawyer named Urooj Rahman, and a 32-year-old lawyer named Colinford Mattis, were arrested for throwing a Molotov cocktail at an unoccupied NYPD van. On July 1, both were charged with seven federal charges and faced long mandatory minimum sentences. In October 2021, both pleaded guilty in federal court in Brooklyn to one count apiece of possession of a destructive device. In June 2022, under revised agreements before U.S. District Judge Brian Cogan in Brooklyn, both pleaded guilty of conspiracy to commit arson and possession of an explosive device. Both attorneys were disbarred, and each was ordered to pay $30,137 in restitution to New York City. In November 2022, Rahman was sentenced to 15 months in prison. In January 2023, Mattis was sentenced to one year and one day in prison.

Reverend Al Sharpton, Gwen Carr, and other activists held a vigil for George Floyd on Staten Island, near where Eric Garner had been killed in 2014. In Jackson Heights and Woodside in Queens, nearly 1,000 protesters marched from Diversity Plaza at Broadway and 37th Road to the NYPD 115th Precinct station on Northern Boulevard.

Around 5,000 people were estimated to have attended various protests around the city. A video circulated depicting an incident in Brooklyn where a police officer pulled a protester's mask off to pepper spray him. The officer was eventually suspended. There were no arrests among the large crowd around Barclays Center, but a few people were arrested for breaking windows nearby. At the end of the third day of unrest, a total of 345 arrests had been made, 33 police officers were injured, and 47 police vehicles had been damaged or destroyed, with several set on fire. Although several videos showed instances of police violence against protesters, no statistics were immediately made available about the number of injured participants.

=== Curfew and escalation (May 31 – June 4) ===
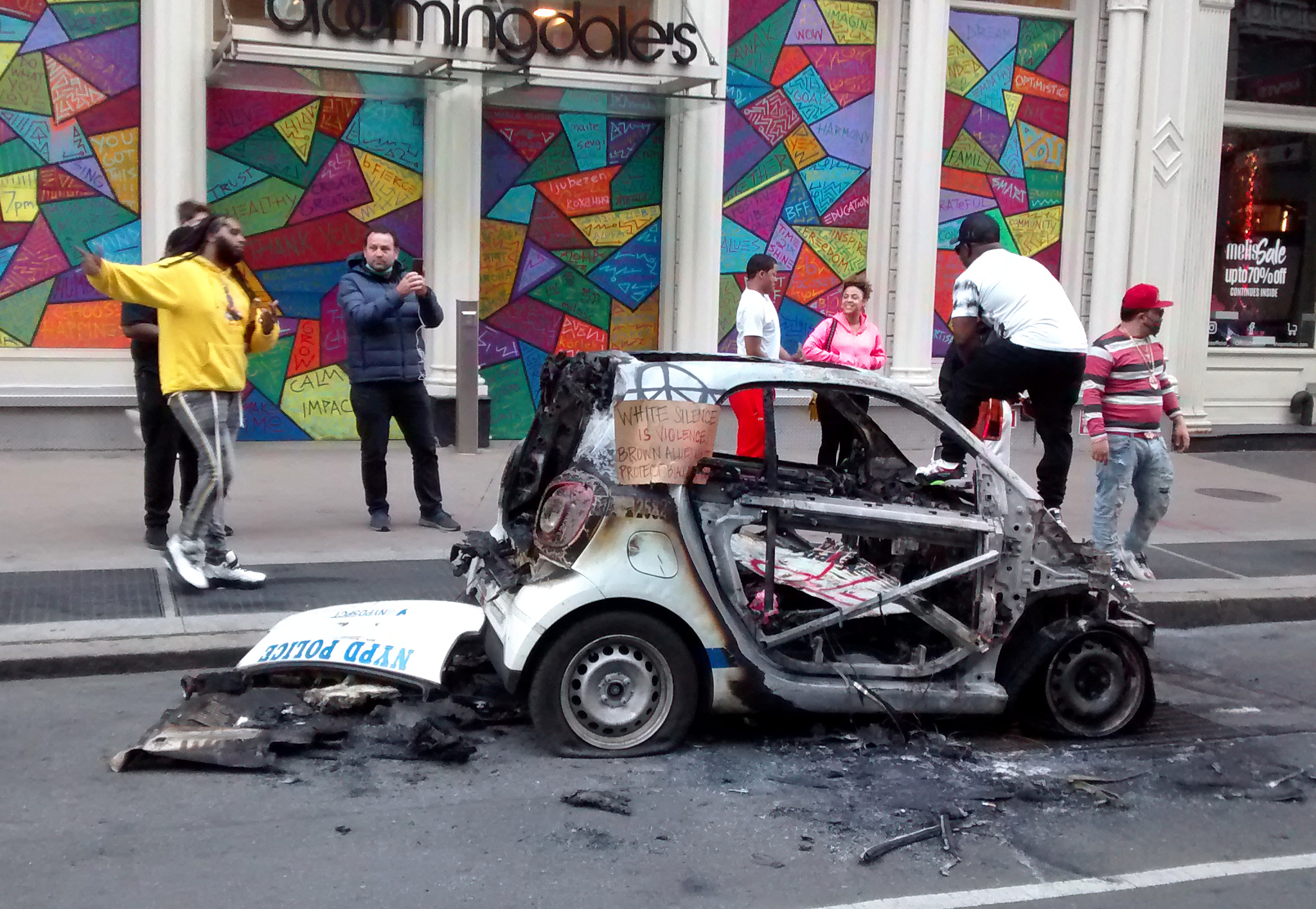
Torched police vehicle in SoHo on May 31

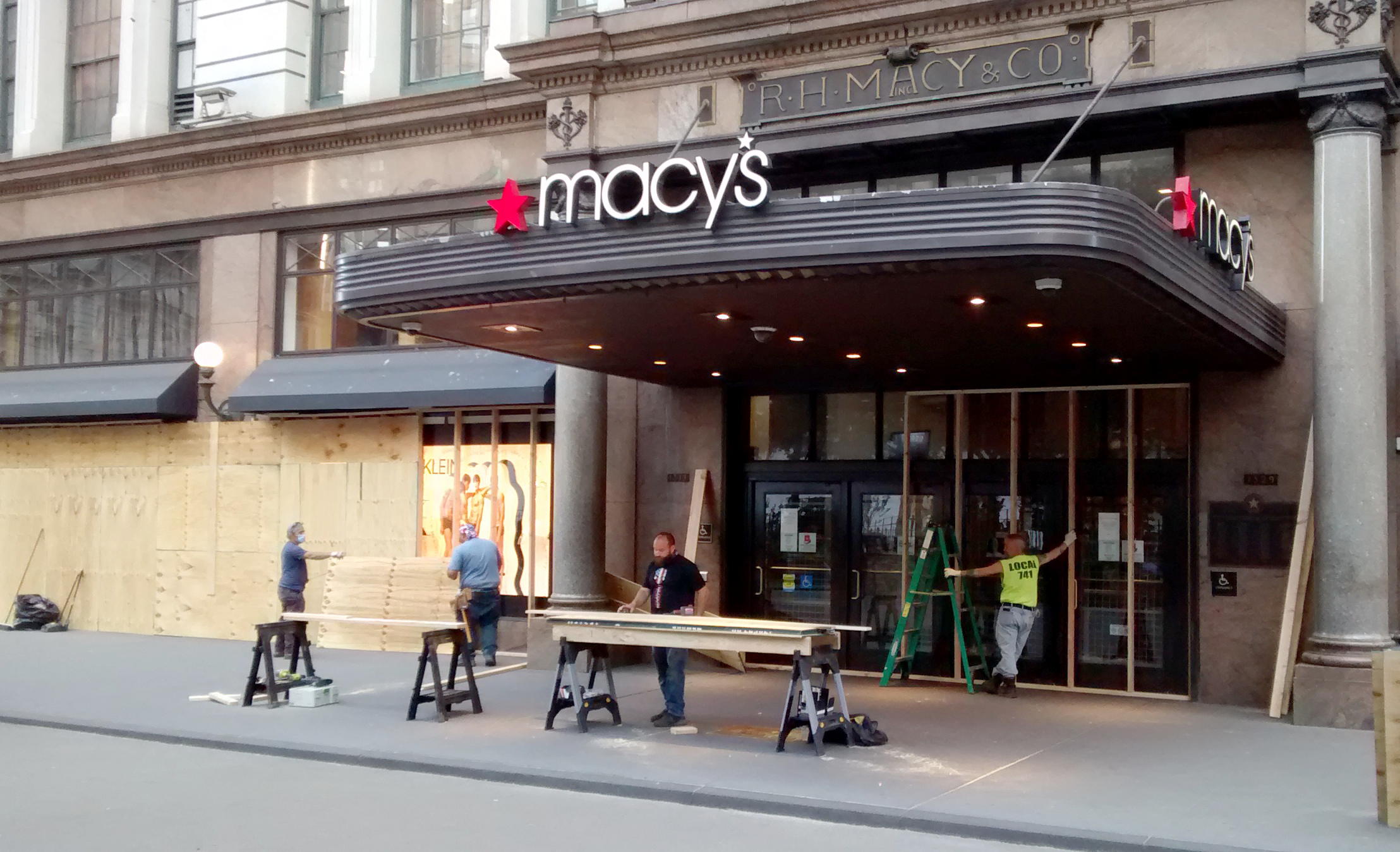
Macy's Herald Square being boarded up on May 31. Nonetheless, the store was looted the night following the next day.

Several gatherings and marches took place on May 31, including large groups which moved from Manhattan to Brooklyn and Brooklyn to Manhattan. Though mostly peaceful during the day, events in Manhattan took a turn toward the violent at night. Hundreds gathered in Bryant Park in Midtown Manhattan before marching in the street, remaining peaceful but blocking traffic. According to The New York Times, "As the crowd moved peacefully up Fifth Avenue, a small group of teenage protesters started knocking over trash cans, drawing rebukes from the rest of the demonstrators." The march went up to Central Park, then south to Foley Square and finally over the Brooklyn Bridge to Barclays Center. The peaceful march drew praise from Police Commissioner Dermot Shea.

In Foley Square, NYPD Lieutenant Robert Cattani knelt with a small number of other officers at the request of protesters. A few days later he apologized for kneeling, saying that he knelt in the hope that it would make the protesters less likely to use violence, but that it was a "horrible decision" that ruined his reputation and "goes against every principle and value that I stand for".

In Brooklyn, about 500 protesters gathered around a stage set up in Grand Army Plaza for a rally. That group and another 500 who had marched from Greenpoint and Williamsburg convened to form a larger demonstration around Barclays Center, where people had been congregating throughout the day. Police presence was minimal until the evening, when large groups marched in different directions, one towards Prospect Park in the southeast and one towards Downtown Brooklyn in the northwest, where some protesters threw objects at police and stores and were arrested. The group tried to cross the Brooklyn Bridge but were turned back; they likewise met resistance at the Manhattan Bridge but were eventually permitted to cross.

A gathering around Union Square that night was more violent. A number of fires were set and some windows were smashed while some people participated in looting amid objections from other protesters. Looting was particularly extensive in the SoHo neighborhood of Manhattan. Gothamist described "shattered glass, bare mannequins, and flaming dumpsters [which] littered the streets of SoHo" the next morning, remarking on the "widespread looting" that "picked clean" several luxury fashion stores. Twelve police officers were injured during the clashes, and 345 protesters were arrested, including Mayor Bill de Blasio's daughter. A police union frequently critical of de Blasio publicized her personal information in violation of department policy.

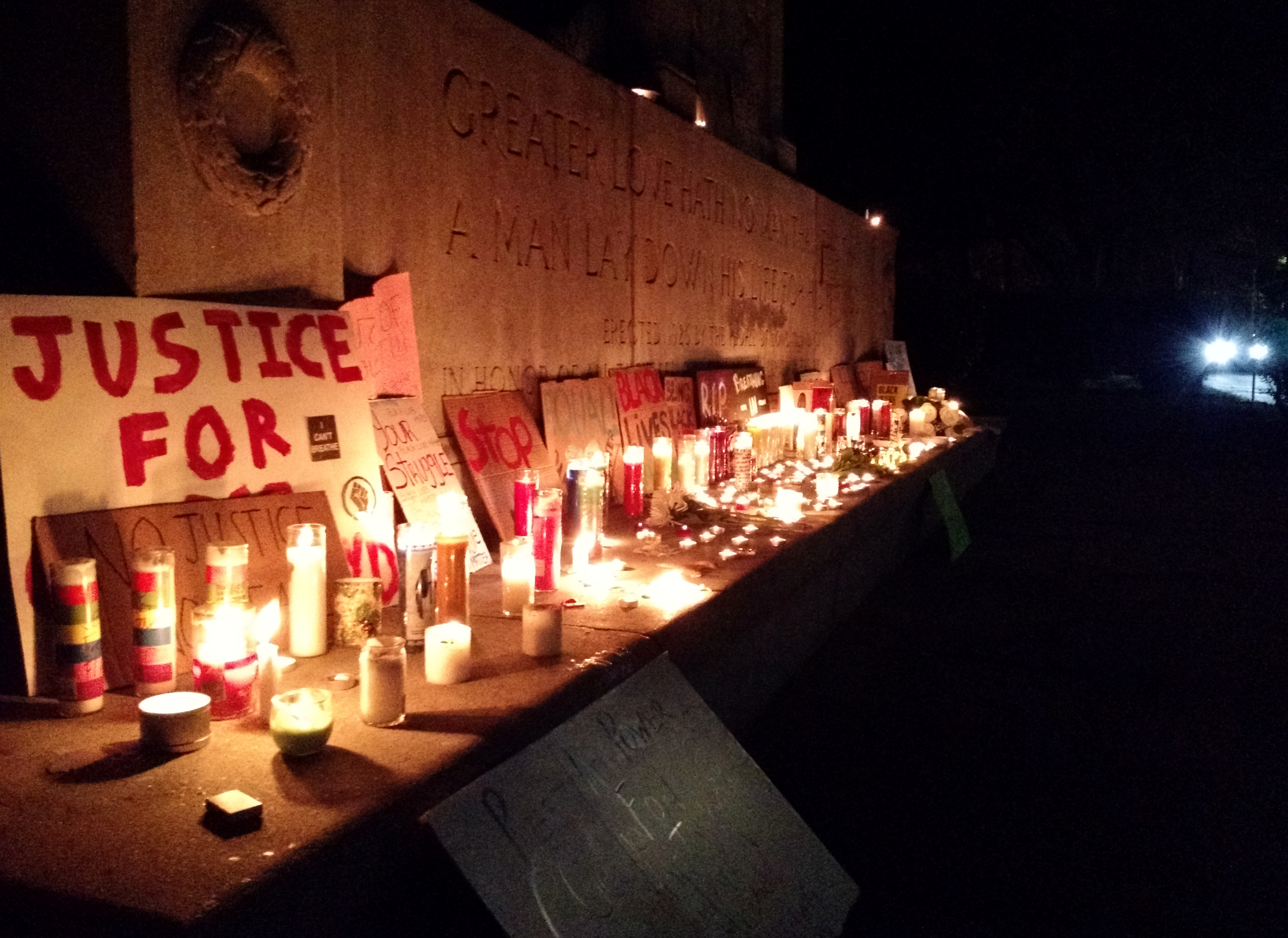
Candlelight memorial in Astoria Park, Queens, on June 1

On June 1, there were protests in Restoration Plaza in Bedford–Stuyvesant, as well as around Radio City Music Hall, and others blocked traffic on the FDR Drive. In Washington Square Park, Police Chief Terence Monahan kneeled with protesters and addressed the crowd to show solidarity. At nightfall, a peaceful candlelight vigil took place at Astoria Park in Queens.

Despite an 11:00 pm curfew implemented that day, and increased police presence aimed at curbing the looting from the night before, demonstrations and widespread looting continued past 11 p.m. in Manhattan and the Bronx. The New York Times highlighted the looting of Macy's Herald Square as a "symbolic blow", albeit with only moderate damage. Gothamist reported on "groups of looters ... jumping into and out of smashed storefronts with duffel bags" before the curfew and an "atmosphere ... of disbelief, as teenagers found themselves able to fill their bags without opposition". Police were forceful in breaking up gatherings after the curfew, using batons and pepper spray, but there were still reports of looting late into the night, with SoHo "largely a free-for-all after 2 a.m." In the Bronx, there was looting and trash fires. More than 700 were arrested, both police and protesters suffered injuries, including two police hit by drivers.

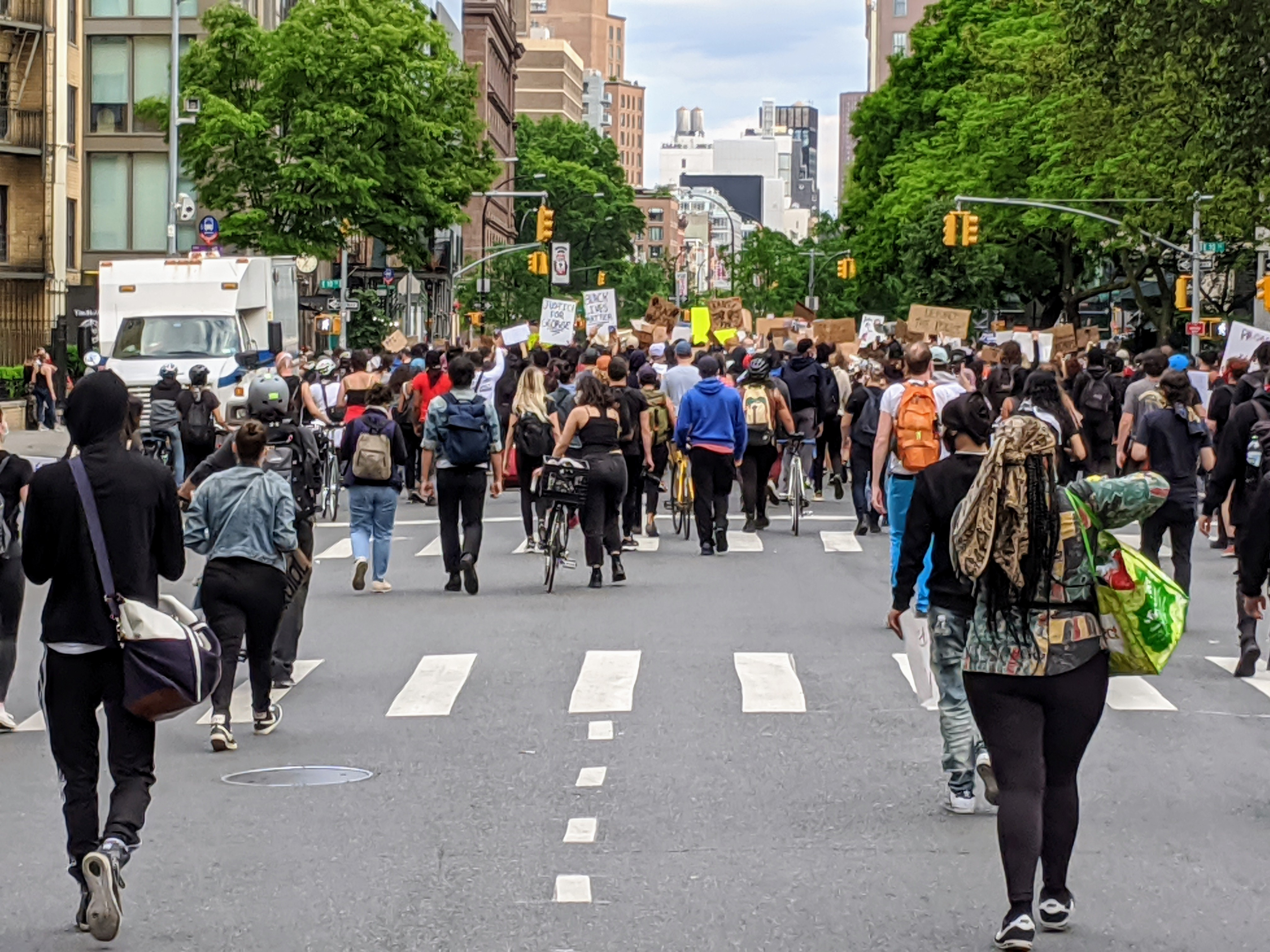
Protesters on Astor Place on June 2

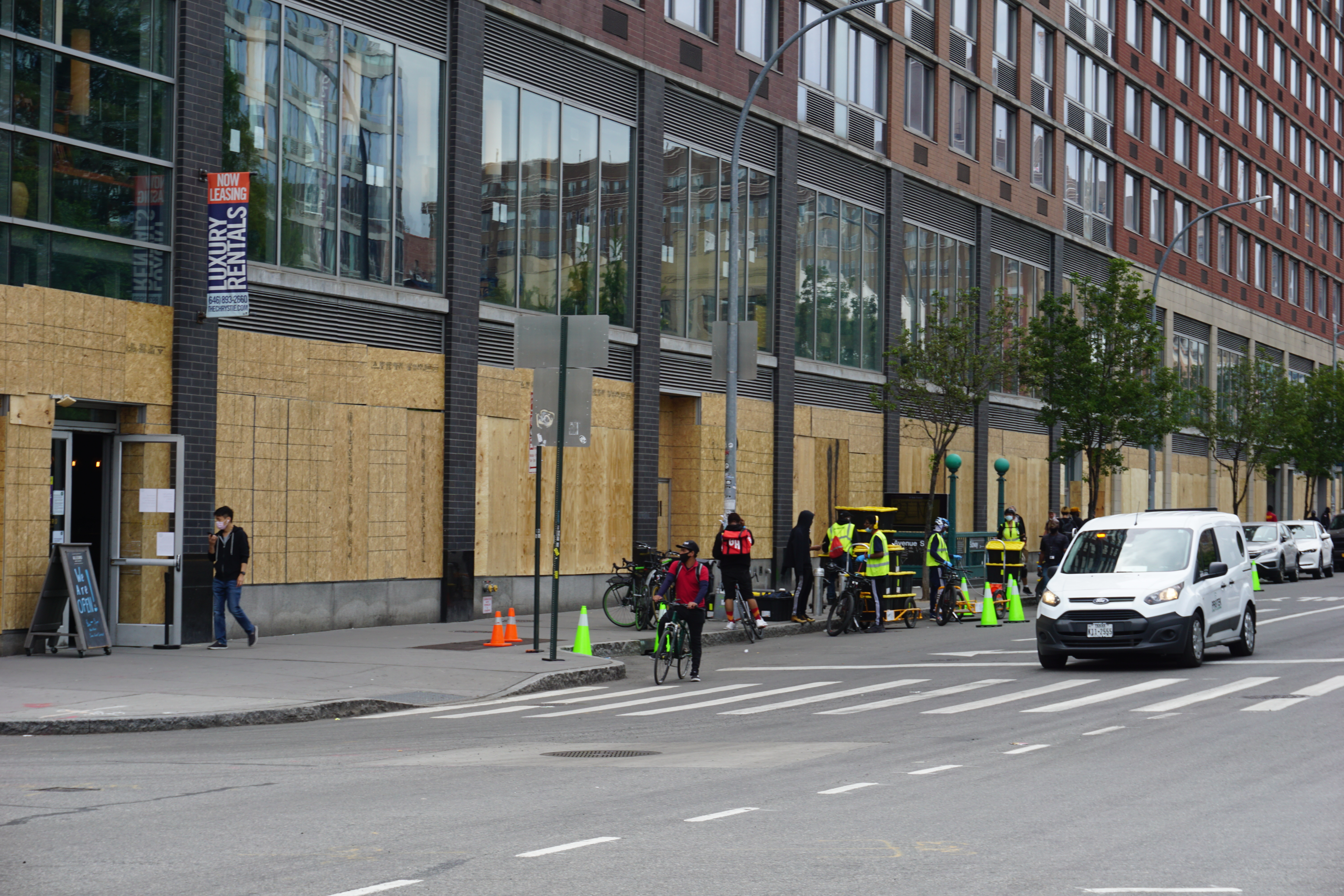
A Whole Foods location on Houston Street boarded up, out of fear of looting, taken on June 2

During the daytime on June 2, protests were less violent than in days prior, and a stricter curfew went into effect requiring people to be indoors by 8:00 pm. Thousands of protesters marched all over the city during the day. There was a peaceful gathering at the National September 11 Memorial, and another event at Foley Square. In Astoria, Queens, about 300 protesters marched from Steinway Street and 30th Avenue to the 114th Precinct on Astoria Boulevard South. In Times Square, more than a hundred doctors convened in a twist on a daily tradition which emerged in the city during the pandemic. Whereas citizens had typically leaned out their windows at 7:00 p.m. to applaud medical personnel and other essential workers, doctors instead turned up to support Black victims of police violence and call attention to systemic inequities through which the coronavirus has similarly disproportionately affected communities of color.

After 8:00 p.m., police began arresting people both for violation of curfew and for suspicion of looting. However, they arrested significantly fewer people than the previous day, with 280 placed under arrest. Some remained outside after the curfew, including a group trying to cross Manhattan Bridge, leading to a standoff with a police that resolved without incident. There were broken windows and reports of looting around Union Square, Astor Place, and Greenwich Village, sometimes thwarted by other protesters. On the night of June 2, members of the anti-crime Guardian Angels organization were beaten by looters attempting to break into a foot locker. Two members were hospitalized during the skirmish.

On the evening of June 3, more defied the curfew, and police were quicker to take action. One group peacefully marching in Brooklyn was met by a line of police in riot gear near Cadman Plaza at about 8:45 p.m. The demonstrators chanted and raised their arms for about 10 minutes while other police in riot gear surrounded them, using a technique called kettling, before moving in, striking protesters with batons, and making arrests. Another group marched from Gracie Mansion towards Central Park after curfew, leading to about 60 arrests near the park. Jumaane Williams, the New York City Public Advocate, expressed outrage at the actions police were taking against peaceful protesters. In Brooklyn, two police officers were reportedly shot and one was stabbed in the neck while guarding against looting during a protest. Their attacker was a Bosnian national who was not involved in the unrest.

Police Chief Monahan said that there would be "no more tolerance ... They have to be off the street, an 8 p.m. curfew. We gave them to 9 p.m., and there was no indication that they were going to leave these streets. We're just not going to take it."

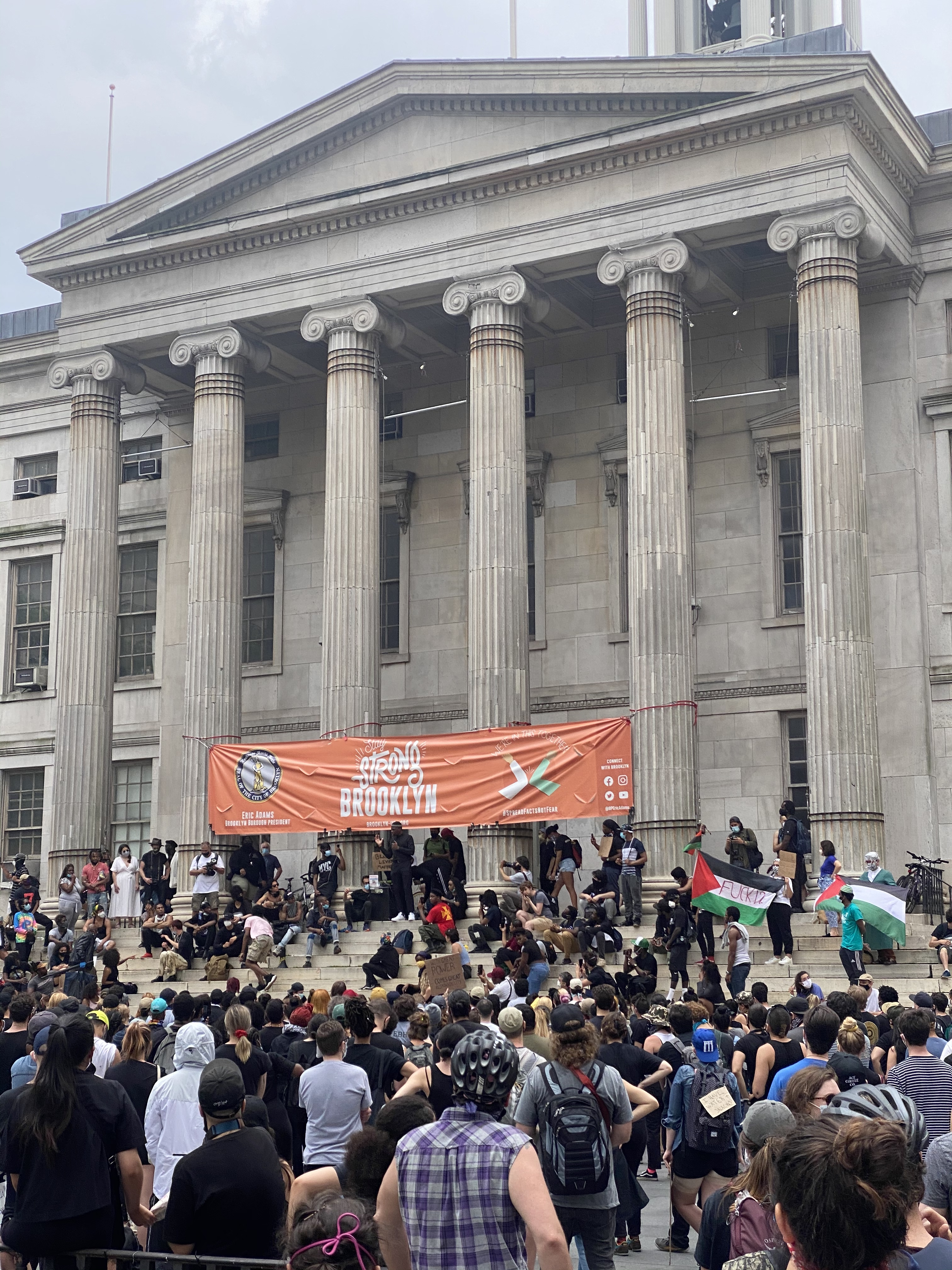
Brooklyn on June 5

On June 4, Terrence Floyd spoke at a memorial for his brother, George Floyd, at Cadman Plaza in Brooklyn, which was attended by more than 10,000 people. Floyd addressed the crowd briefly, after being overcome by emotions and brought to tears. "My brother is gone, but the Floyd name lives on", he said. "I'm just thankful about the movement that's going on." He also added "I'm proud of the protest, but I'm not proud of the destruction ... My brother wasn't about that", condemning the violence and looting that had occurred at some protests. Several other community leaders spoke at the memorial, including Brooklyn clergyman Kevin McCall, State Attorney General Letitia James, Public Advocate Jumaane Williams, Brooklyn Borough President Eric Adams, and Mayor Bill de Blasio, whose appearance marked the first time he spoke to protesters in person. Thousands of attendees marched across the Brooklyn Bridge into Manhattan after the memorial, using the bridge's Manhattan-bound roadway and the raised pedestrian walkway. Drivers in the Brooklyn-bound roadway honked their horns and raised their fists in solidarity with the protesters.

In the afternoon, Assemblywoman Diana Richardson and New York State Senator Zellnor Myrie, along with the Black, Puerto Rican, Hispanic & Asian Legislative Caucus, held a press conference at 20 Grand Army Plaza where they introduced a package of police reform legislation. Attendees of the rally marched peacefully through Brooklyn after the event.

Just before the 8:00 p.m. curfew, police officers trapped hundreds of peaceful protesters in the Mott Haven neighborhood of the South Bronx. People marching down 136th Street encountered armored bicycle police while another group of officers blocked off the other end of the street, pushing protesters into the police on bicycles. Police then pepper sprayed the trapped demonstrators and hit several with batons. Some demonstrators were tackled and arrested. In total, 263 people were arrested, including journalists and at least 11 legal observers of the National Lawyers Guild (NLG). Legal observers were exempt from the curfew, and the local chapter of the NLG said the observers were targets of intentional harassment by police. Terence Monahan, who oversaw the event, as well as the NYPD, were criticized by both local media and neighborhood residents for their aggressive actions. Commissioner Shea said the intervention was "executed nearly flawlessly" and justified police actions by citing "outside agitators" that he said were planning to "burn things down ... injure cops ... [and] cause mayhem."

Aggressive post-curfew policing also occurred later in the evening in Fort Greene and Williamsburg, Brooklyn, where officers charged into a group of demonstrators, tackling protesters to the ground and making multiple arrests. In Clinton Hill, a march was met by police later in the evening, with people pushed to the ground, and hit with batons. As in other incidents, when protesters fled, they were met with another group of police. Public Advocate Jumaane Williams and City Council Member Brad Lander, who were following the procession, intervened with police and participants were allowed to leave.

A total of about 270 people were arrested across the city on June 4, including two delivery workers not engaged with the protests. Video of a man with a food delivery backpack being arrested circulated on social media, leading Mayor de Blasio to condemn the arrest and highlight that the city considered food delivery an essential service. 1,349 people were issued a summons for violating the curfew.

=== Continued peaceful protests (June 5–14) ===
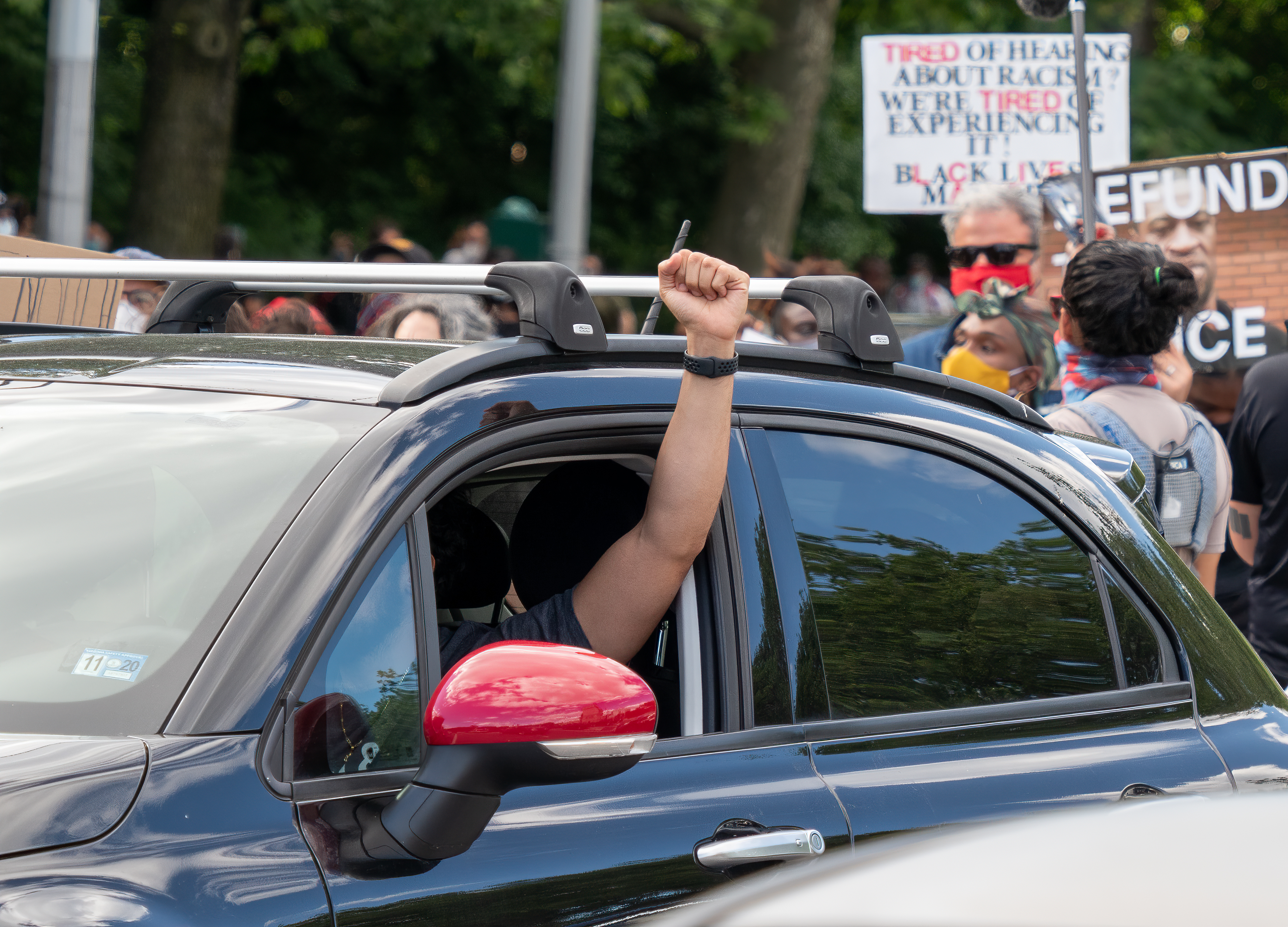
A driver extends a fist in support of protesters amid a march in Brooklyn.

More than 1,000 people demonstrated on June 5 at the Metropolitan Detention Center in Sunset Park, Brooklyn. Two days earlier, an inmate died after being pepper sprayed by guards. Another 500 rallied in Columbus Circle. Though the protests were mostly peaceful during the day, there were again some conflicts after curfew. Police arrested around 40 people near Grand Army Plaza in Brooklyn. The Times reported on groups of volunteers setting up "jail support" sites, providing medical supplies, hand sanitizer, shoelaces, food, and advice to people as they were released after being arrested. Peaceful protests continued on June 6, with the 8:00 p.m. – 5:00 a.m. curfew still in effect. Police arrested four people and issued 24 summonses.

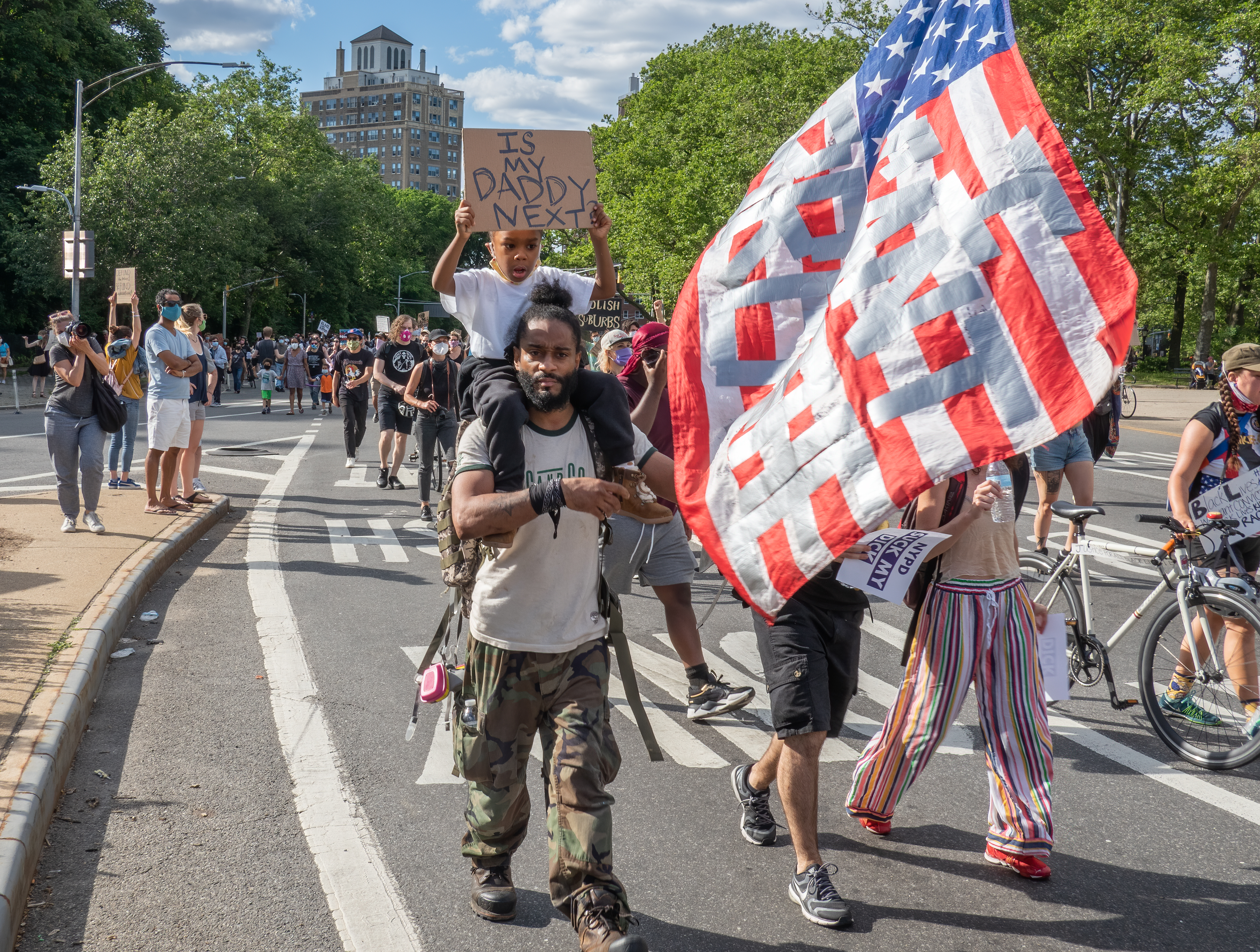
One of several peaceful marches in Brooklyn on June 7

The citywide curfew ended on June 7, a day earlier than expected, after arrests had reduced significantly in the preceding days. According to the Times, marches that day "were largely jubilant, with the police taking a more passive role with protesters, and protesters in turn avoiding clashes with the police". Thousands marched around Columbus Circle. Unlike marches in preceding days, it was not followed by police, officers instead lined up in riot gear nearby. Another group started in Bryant Park, traveled to the West Village, and blocked part of the West Side Highway. Thousands marched from Union Square to Central Park, blocked traffic along the 79th Street transverse, and later went to Gracie Mansion. In Brooklyn, there were rallies and marches in Fort Greene, McCarren Park, Grand Army Plaza, Crown Heights, and Dumbo. The Black Surfing Association organized a "Paddle Out" in Rockaway Beach that drew hundreds of supporters Sunday morning. The event was closely monitored by police.

Hundreds of city workers gathered at City Hall on June 8 to criticize actions taken by the mayor and NYPD during the protests. The group marched east across the Brooklyn Bridge to Cadman Plaza in Downtown Brooklyn. More than a thousand people met in Washington Square Park in the West Village in the late afternoon for a rally before marching uptown without incident.

There was a bicycle protest which started in Grand Army Plaza in the evening, traveled across the Williamsburg Bridge, crossed Manhattan, and went up the West Side Highway before heading back to Brooklyn across Manhattan Bridge. In Clinton Hill, Brooklyn, protesters convened outside the 88th Precinct to demonstrate against Immigration and Customs Enforcement (ICE). ICE officers were seen there in days prior, raising concerns due to New York's sanctuary city status. A statement from the NYPD the following day clarified that ICE, as well as Homeland Security Investigations and the Federal Bureau of Investigation were supporting the police department with personnel and resources while it was under strain during the protests.

An evening rally was held at Brooklyn Borough Hall, hosted by Public Advocate Jumaane Williams. More than a thousand people then moved to cross the Brooklyn Bridge, were temporarily stopped by police, and then permitted to cross on the roadway itself. In the Bronx, people came to Pelham Bay Park for a vigil attended by Akeem Browder, brother of Kalief Browder, who committed suicide after being imprisoned for three years awaiting trial for a petty crime for which he was never convicted. Later in the evening, the marchers that started in Brooklyn joined a protest at City Hall attended by twenty family members of people killed by police, including Eric Garner's mother Gwen Carr, Ramarley Graham's mother Constance Malcolm, Kimani Gray's mother Carol Gray, Amadou Diallo's mother Kadiatou Diallo, Shantel Davis's sister Natasha Duncan, and Sean Bell's mother Valerie Bell.

Mayor de Blasio announced plans to name streets in all of the five boroughs after figures in the Black Lives Matter movement, as well as to paint words associated with the protests on the streets similar to Black Lives Matter Plaza in Washington, DC.

A crowd convened at Washington Square Park on June 10 before moving north to Bryant Park, kneeling and blocking 5th Avenue and ending at New York Public Library. More than a thousand protesters on bicycles gathered again in Grand Army Plaza, riding around Brooklyn and Manhattan. On June 11, a long march began in Harlem and traveled south to Wall Street. According to Gothamist, protesters brought red paint "to drip and paint on the streets to 'symbolize the blood militant forces such as the police cause Black people to shed'". There was only one arrest, involving a man who painted "Black Lives Matter" on a sign, but no action was taken against protesters dripping their red paint.

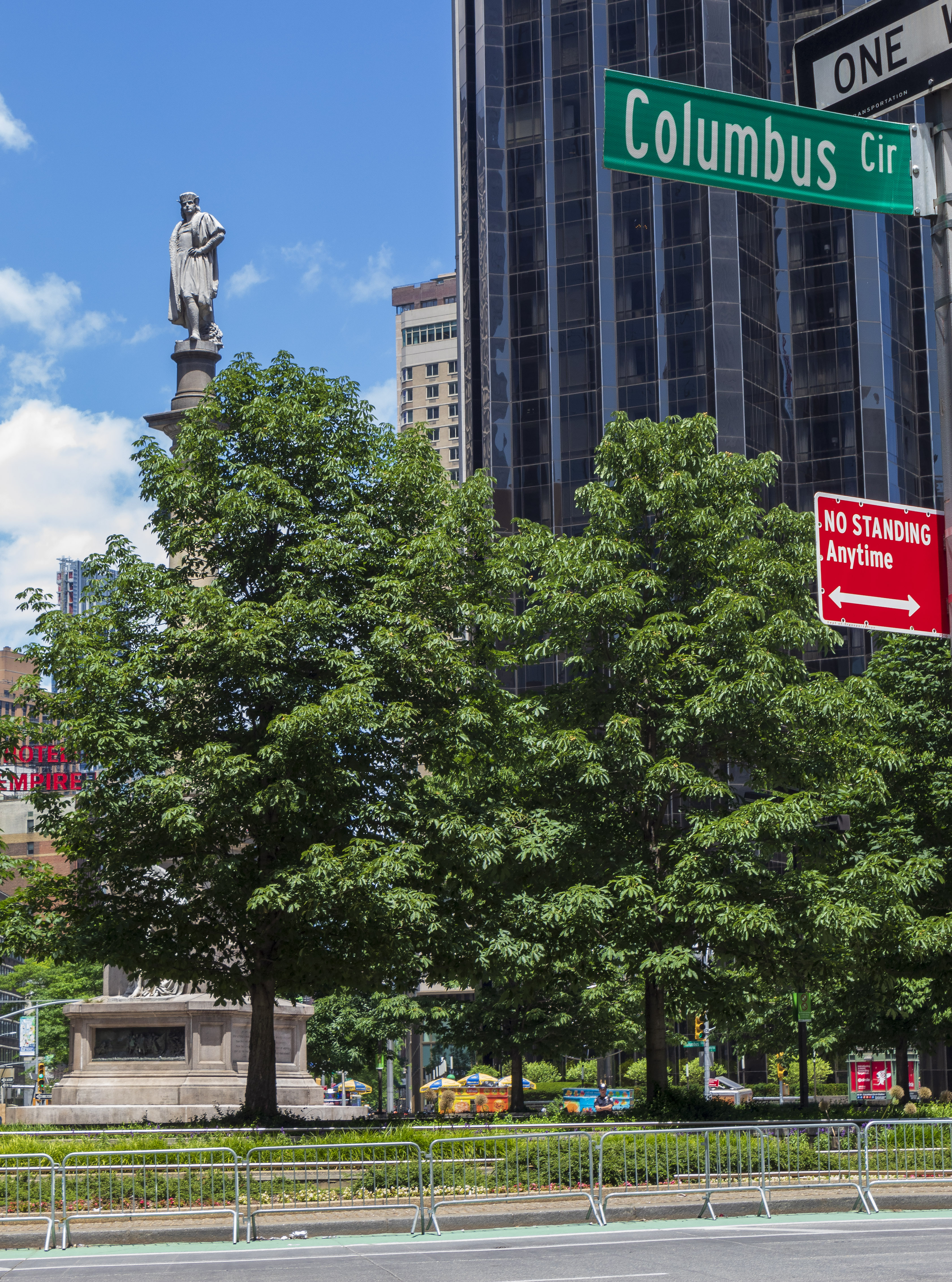
The Columbus Monument blocked off for public access by NYPD crowd control barriers over fears of vandalism

The mayor renewed calls to change the name of a street in Fort Hamilton, Brooklyn, named after Confederate general Robert E. Lee. He had done so before, in 2017, but the Army declined the request. Governor Andrew Cuomo also addressed calls to take down the statue of Christopher Columbus in Columbus Circle in Manhattan. Cuomo said he did not support removing the statue. While he agreed with objections to Columbus's actions, he said "the statue has come to represent and signify appreciation for the Italian-American contribution to New York".

Musician Jon Batiste leads a rally and performance at Barclays Center on June 12

On June 12, there was a rally and concert at Barclays Center titled "WE ARE: A REVIVAL". It was led by musician Jon Batiste, who set up a piano and played music while wearing gloves and a mask and encouraged people to register to vote. Demonstrators also reconvened in the South Bronx where, on June 4, police kettled and arrested hundreds of peaceful protesters. The group demanded the resignation of the officers involved while they were followed by another group of police. There was also another bike protest bicycle ride which began at Grand Army Plaza. Participants bicycled to Manhattan before returning to Brooklyn. Thousands gathered for a "Black Trans Lives Matter" march on June 14 in front of the Brooklyn Museum, with organizers estimating 15,000 people taking part.

=== Occupy City Hall and statue vandalism (June 23–30) ===
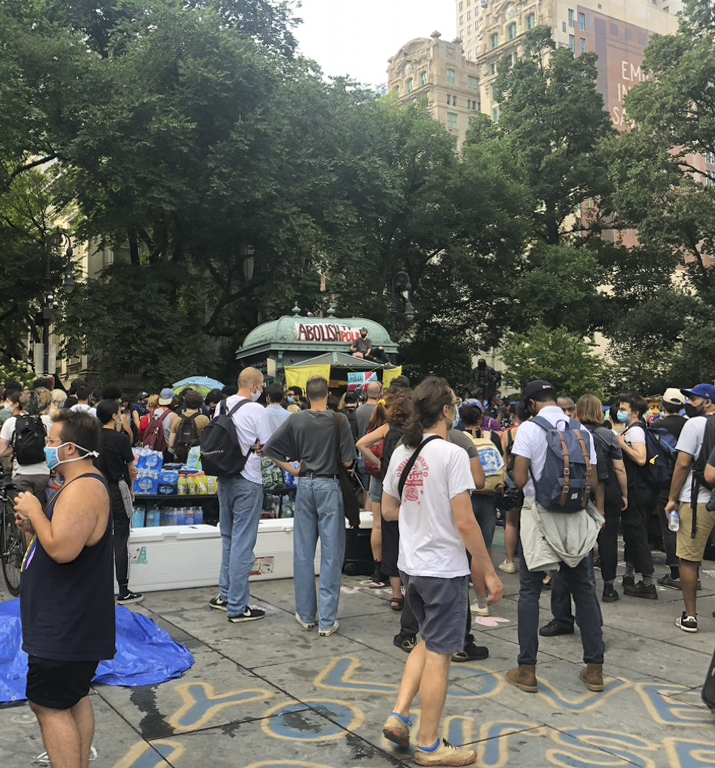
Occupy City Hall Protesters listening to a speech at City Hall Plaza calling for the defunding of the NYPD

On June 23, activists set up a protest encampment in Lower Manhattan's City Hall Park demanding $1 billion in cuts to the NYPD and vowing to stay until June 30, when the City Council and de Blasio were set to finalize the budget. The gathering began with about a hundred protesters, planned by the grassroots organization Vocal-NY, but soon spread to occupy most of the park. According to The New York Times, the event took inspiration from Occupy Wall Street which took place in Lower Manhattan in 2011. The Times reported on how "organizers, largely black and queer, have transformed the plaza. Hand-drawn art covers any semblance of government infrastructure". The group maintained a community library, garden, welcome desk, and tea house, and implemented systems for the collection and distribution of food and supplies, public safety, and wireless internet. On June 25, the grassroots organization Jews For Racial & Economic Justice organized a Shabbat service at the encampment under the banner "Jews For Black Lives." The site became a meeting point for various marches, which had crisscrossed large parts of the city since the protests began. After the budget deadline passed, some remained in the park, but reports of vandalism and homelessness grew and police forcibly cleared the area a month after it began, on July 22. Raymond Spinella, the police department's chief of support services said the area would be closed for several weeks for extensive clean up. This came days after President Trump deployed federal forces in Portland, Oregon and other American cities as part of Operation Legend to protect federal property and subdue occasional violence.

On June 24, someone spray painted "slave owner" on a statue of George Washington in Union Square, Manhattan, one of many incidents of statues and other monuments vandalized or taken down in the wake of the murder of George Floyd. On June 29, two people were caught on camera vandalizing statues of George Washington on the Washington Square Arch by throwing balloons filled with red paint at them. President Donald Trump noted the incident, calling for "Anarchists" to be prosecuted under a new executive order aimed at stopping efforts to remove monuments of slave-owners and racists.

=== 2021 ===
Several events were held a year after the initial protests. At a National Action Network event in Harlem on the anniversary of Floyd's murder, Al Sharpton, Mayor de Blasio, and others took a knee for nine minutes, twenty-two seconds. Participants reflected on the past year's protests and advocated for legislation like the George Floyd Justice in Policing Act. Thousands of people gathered for other events around the city, including a large rally at Barclays Center followed by a march around Brooklyn.

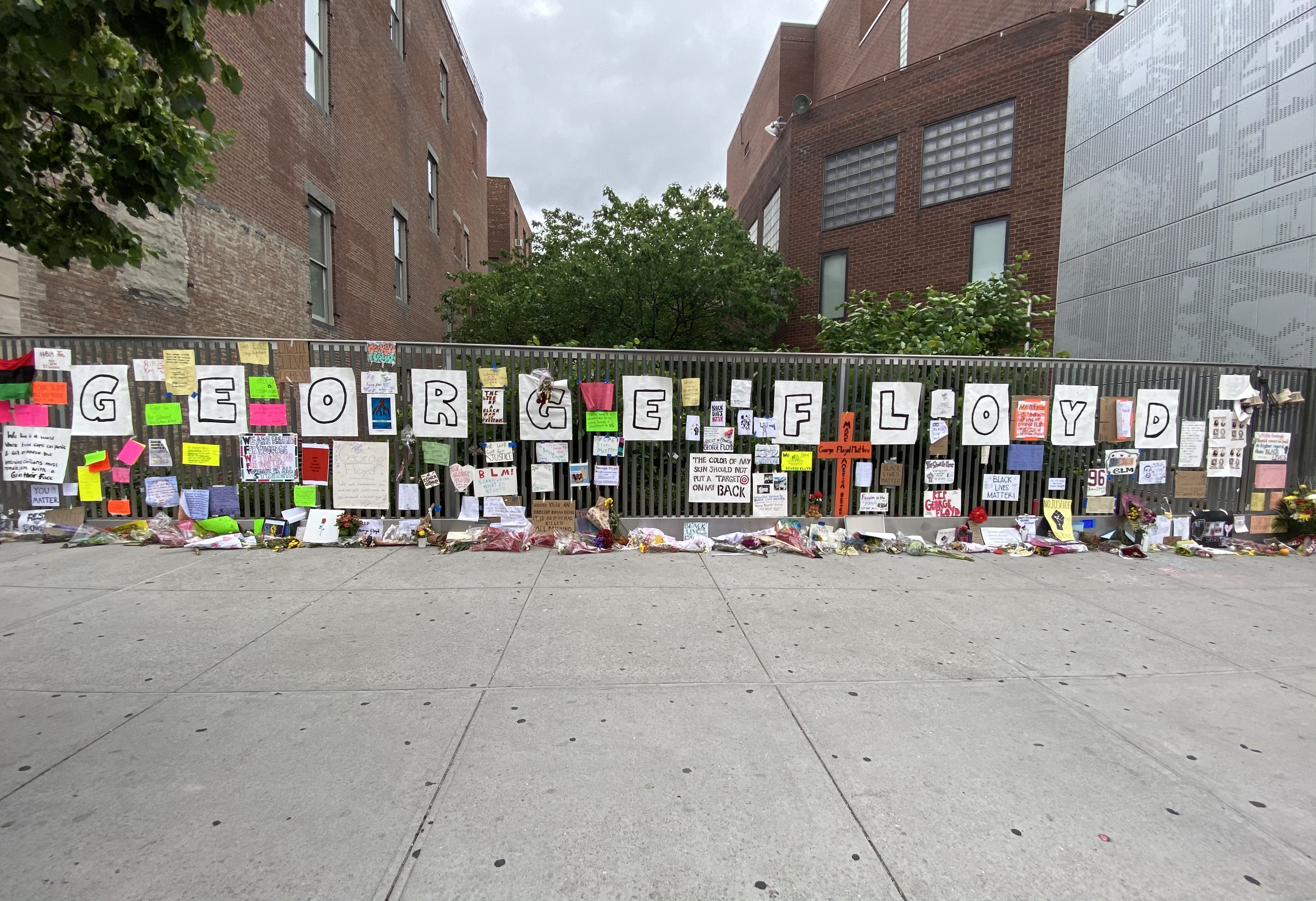
Organized by Harlem resident Gerdine Behrmann, the community created a George Floyd Tribute Wall along the 135th Street side of the Schomburg Center for Research in Black Culture in 2020.

== Government response ==
Arrests between May 28 – June 7
Crime	Pre-curfew arrests	Post-curfew arrests	Total
Commercial burglary	482	68	550
Unlawful assembly	137	60	197
Obstructing governmental administration	109	28	137
Criminal possession of stolen property	112	2	114
Criminal misc.	54	12	66
Assaulting a police officer	29	10	39
Possession of burglary tools	13	10	23
Total arrests reported	936	190	1,126

Curfew summonses by race/ethnicity between June 1–7
Black or Black Hispanic	White	White Hispanic	Asian/Pacific Islander	Unknown/Other	Total
569	413	280	59	28	1,349
42.2%	30.6%	20.8%	4.4%	2%	100%

By June 7, police had arrested 1,126 on a variety of charges, all but 39 non-violent in nature. Most of the arrests were made before a curfew was implemented. 1,349 people were arrested after the curfew went into effect .

=== Curfew ===
On June 1, Mayor Bill de Blasio met with Governor Cuomo and the two declared a curfew for New York City starting at 11 p.m., lasting until 5:00 a.m. Tuesday morning. It was the first city-wide curfew imposed in New York since the Harlem riot of 1943, which followed a white police officer shooting an African American.

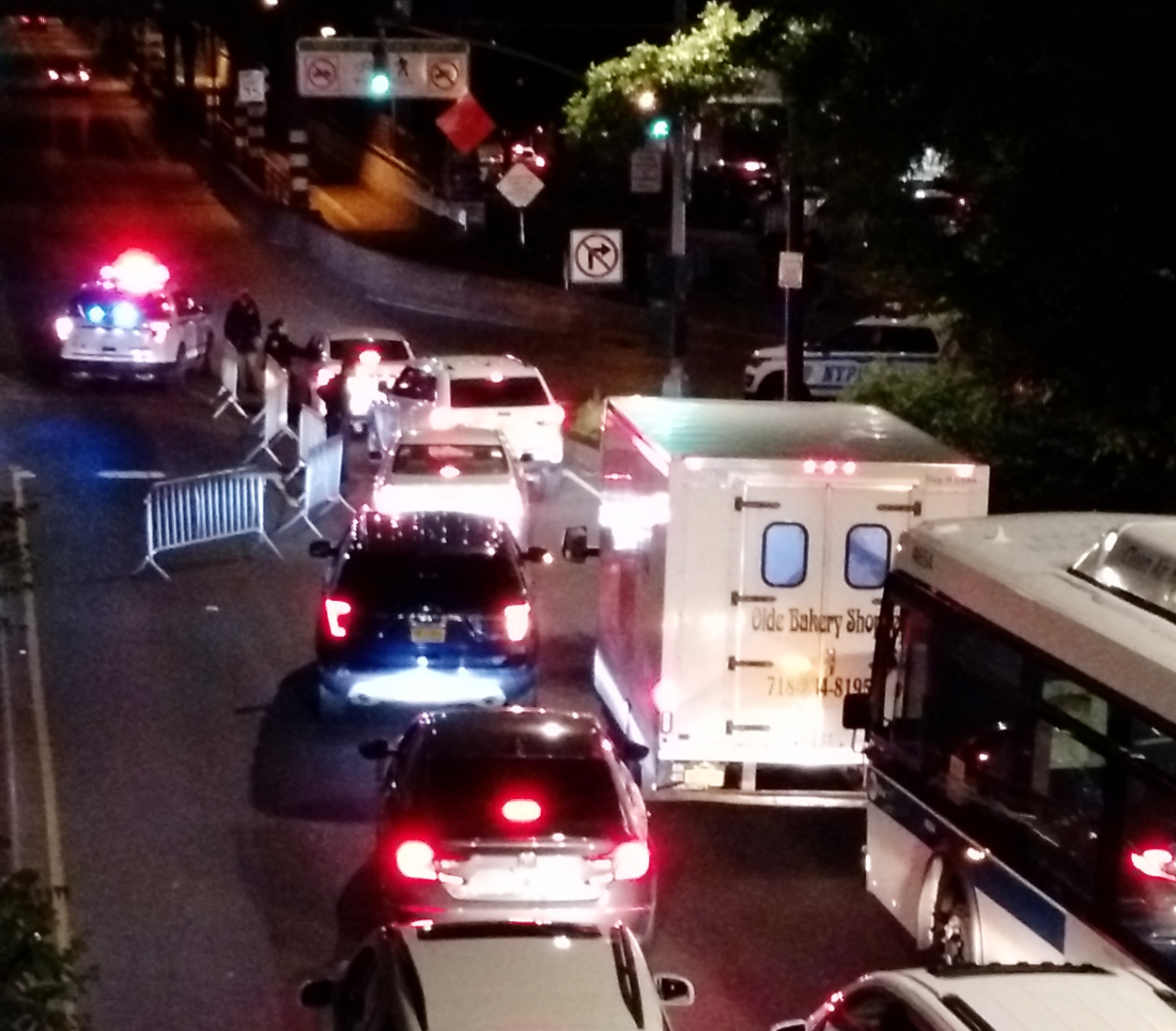
Police checkpoint for vehicles entering Manhattan via the Queensboro Bridge during curfew

There was still some looting and vandalism the first night of the curfew, but most of the conflicts were between police and protesters out after curfew. According to the New Yorker's Emily Witt, "the Mayor appeared to have given the carte blanche to arrest whomever it wanted after nightfall, and process them through a crowded Central Booking, which raised some questions: Whose health? And whose safety? And whose city, exactly, was protected by the order?"

The following day, on June 2, the governor criticized handling of demonstrations the night before: "The NYPD and the mayor did not do their job last night" calling the video evidence of the looting "a disgrace". Cuomo offered to send in the National Guard, but de Blasio opposed the idea. The mayor signed a Declaration of Emergency, Executive Order No. 119, imposing an even earlier curfew of 8:00 pm, in effect from June 3 through June 8. The order exempts from the curfew "police officers, peace officers, firefighters, first responders and emergency medical technicians, individuals traveling to and from essential work and performing essential work, people experiencing homelessness and without access to a viable shelter, and individuals seeking medical treatment or medical supplies". The curfew also stopped Citi Bike rentals, ride shares, scooters, and restricted car traffic in Manhattan below 96th Street.

The New York Times criticized the NYPD's use of kettling as a policing tactic against peaceful protesters after curfew, as in Cadman Plaza on June 3 and in the South Bronx on June 4. The Times' Ali Watkins called it "among the most unsettling symbols of its use of force against peaceful protests". De Blasio defended the approach as necessary to address the persistent looting problem.

The curfew ended on Sunday, June 7, a day earlier than expected.

=== Response by district attorneys ===
In New York City, each of the five boroughs has its own district attorney. On June 5, the Manhattan district attorney, Cyrus Vance Jr., announced that his office would be declining to prosecute those arrested for unlawful assembly or disorderly conduct. According to existing policy, the cases would remain on the books for six months and acted upon only if the defendant committed an additional crime. In a statement, he said, "The prosecution of protesters charged with these low-level offenses undermines critical bonds between law enforcement and the communities we serve." Brooklyn district attorney Eric Gonzalez similarly announced his intention to decline prosecuting unlawful assembly, and added violating curfew to the lesser charges his office would pass on. Police Benevolent Association president Patrick J. Lynch called Gonzalez's decision a "dereliction of duty". In the Bronx, district attorney Darcel Clark issued summonses instead of prosecuting for unlawful assembly or violating curfew.

=== Claims about outside agitators ===
According to Deputy Commissioner John Miller, in the early days of the protests, unidentified bad actors had planned to take advantage of the protests to commit violence, with an organized systems of communication, funding for bail, medical provisions, bicycle scouts, and a supply of destructive materials like rocks and gasoline.

After the South Bronx kettling incident on June 4, Commissioner Shea said that the demonstration was led by "outside agitators" who coordinated bringing guns and gasoline to use in the demonstration, "advertising that they were going to burn things down, that they were going to injure cops, that they were going to cause mayhem". Gothamist reported on the lack of evidence for claims of outside agitators. The NYPD had mentioned a gun and gasoline, but the gun was taken from a gang member hours earlier one-half mile (0.80 km) away and there was no evidence of gasoline. The South Bronx protests were organized by Shannon Jones of Bronxites for NYPD Accountability and Shellyne Rodriguez of Take Back the Bronx, both of whom were arrested.

The Guardian criticized comments by the Police Benevolent Association, which described its members as being "under attack by violent, organized terrorists", as well as Sergeants Benevolent Association president Ed Mullins, who told his members "to report for duty with your helmet and baton and do not hesitate to utilize that equipment in securing your personal safety".

== Incidents of excessive force ==
There were several controversial interactions between police and protesters, including examples of excessive force. The Black, Latino and Asian Caucus of the New York City Council released a statement a few days into the protests saying the NYPD "[acted] with aggression towards New Yorkers who vigorously and vociferously but nonetheless peacefully advocated for justice".

Governor Andrew Cuomo and Mayor de Blasio quickly announced investigations into several reported instances of police violence, and police actions drew criticism from several stakeholders and reporters. On May 30, de Blasio condemned the violence of the night before by both police and protesters. Cuomo spoke with de Blasio and announced an independent review by Attorney General Letitia James of actions taken during the protests that occurred on May 29. The following day, the mayor announced another investigation of police actions to be carried out by Corporation Counsel Jim Johnson and Department of Investigation Commissioner Margaret Garnett.

The New York Times collected videos depicting police use of force during the protests, which it published in July 2020, leading Mayor de Blasio to request investigations of the incidents. The NYPD determined that only five of the sixty-four incidents warranted discipline such as taking vacation days from involved officers. In December 2020, the New York Department of Investigation released a 115-page report on the NYPD's response during the protests. The report describes a lack of training and preparedness, use of excessive force, unnecessary escalation, lack of strategy, inconsistent enforcement of the curfew, and actions taken based on misinformation. The same day, Mayor de Blasio released an apology for the way the protests were handled. According to the Attorney General's January 2021 report, officers "struck protesters with blunt instruments at least 50 times, unlawfully deployed pepper spray against protesters in at least 30 incidents, and used unreasonable force through pushing or striking protesters at least 75 times". As of March 2021, the Civilian Complaint Review Board (CCRB), an independent agency which investigates complaints against NYPD officers, received 297 complaints covering 2,000 allegations related to the protests.

=== Woman shoved to the ground (May 29, 2020) ===
On May 29, NYPD Police Officer Vincent D'Andraia violently shoved Dounya Zayer, 20, to the ground as she marched with a protest in Brooklyn. A reporter for Newsweek recorded a mobile phone video of the act which went viral after it was shared online. It depicts the D'Andraia calling Zayer a "bitch" and shoving her with both hands after she asked about his order to get out of the street. Zayer said that she suffered a concussion and seizures. D'Andraia was suspended without pay. The Brooklyn District Attorney's Office charged him with misdemeanor assault, criminal mischief, harassment and menacing—the first and only officer to be criminally charged for actions taken during the protests. The charges were met with criticism by police union leader Patrick Lynch, who argued the officer's "boss sent him out there, to do a job, was put in a bad situation during a chaotic time". Brooklyn Criminal Court dismissed the charges as part of a restorative justice program with the Zayer's consent. Zayer also sued the NYPD, resulting in a settlement of $387,000, of which D'Andraia was responsible for paying $3,000.

=== NYPD vehicle driven into crowd (May 30, 2020) ===
Officers drove their vehicles into protesters who blocked their path in Brooklyn

A video of a crowd of protesters clashing with the NYPD attracted attention on May 30, showing police officers accelerating into a crowd of people. In response to the video, de Blasio minimized this action by shifting blame to the protesters: "I wish the officers had found a different approach, but let's begin at the beginning. The protesters in that video did the wrong thing to surround that police car, period." After drawing criticism, with multiple publications highlighting that he ran for mayor on a platform of police reform, he walked back those comments on June 1 to say "There is no situation where a police vehicle should drive into a crowd of protesters or New Yorkers." The Guardian wrote that the video, viewed more than 30 million times as of June 4, "quickly shredded years of effort to repair the deeply tarnished image of the NYPD". In December 2023, NYPD Commissioner Edward Caban cleared officers Andrey Samusev and Daniel Alvarez of misconduct charges sought by the Civilian Complaint Review Board for improper use of force.

=== Protester pepper sprayed after mask pulled off (May 30, 2020) ===
Still image from a viral video depicting a protester as a police officer moves to remove his mask and pepper spray him.

On May 30, a video of an incident at a Brooklyn protest circulated on social media depicting a black protester, wearing a mask, with his hands up approached by a police officer who pulls the protester's mask off in order to pepper spray his face. After an investigation, the officer involved was suspended without pay and referred to an internal disciplinary process. Bodycam footage later showed the officer bragging about his actions. The internal disciplinary process did not result in any discipline for the act, although the officer lost ten vacation days for not filling out the correct paperwork and failing to notify his supervisor about the incident.

=== Kettling and aggressive post-curfew policing (June 1–7, 2020) ===
After the curfew was implemented, conflicts between protesters and police largely took place after 8:00 pm. According to Chief Monahan, police showed some leniency at first, but said publicly there would be "no more tolerance" for people protesting after curfew. On the evening of June 3, marchers in Brooklyn ran into a line of police in Cadman Plaza in Downtown Brooklyn. While the crowd chanted and demonstrated, police filled in behind them, hemming the group in using a method known as kettling, before aggressively moving in and arresting people.

On June 4, just before the 8:00 pm curfew, peaceful protesters were kettled in the Mott Haven neighborhood of the Bronx, with police on one end of 136th Street pushing protesters into a group of armored police on bicycles at the other end of the street. Police used pepper spray and batons to arrest 263 people. The police chief and the NYPD received criticism from the media and people in the neighborhood for taking an aggressive approach. Asked for comment, Shea said that it was "executed nearly flawlessly", considering the involvement of "outside agitators". The Deputy Inspector of the nearby 40th Precinct said the response had been necessitated by social media posts that predicted violence, and violence at previous events held by the same organizers. Human Rights Watch published a lengthy report about the Mott Haven incident, finding evidence that the NYPD violated protesters' constitutional and human rights.

Aggressive post-curfew policing also occurred in Fort Greene, Williamsburg, and Clinton Hill, Brooklyn. In the latter, as in other incidents, when protesters fled, they were met with another group of police hemming them in. The Clinton Hill protesters were permitted to disperse after an intervention by local politicians. Among those arrested on June 4 were journalists, delivery workers not involved with the protests, and legal observers who claimed they were targeted by police for harassment.

In Crown Heights, Brooklyn, police responded to a noise complaint at a barbecue outside a residential building. Police told people to go inside because of the curfew, leading to a conflict during which police pushed residents into their building. The curfew did not apply to people gathering on their own private property. Several police pushed their way into the building's foyer, where they attacked residents, attempted to enter residents' apartments, and made numerous arrests. As of June 9, 2020, the incident was under internal review.

1,349 summonses were issued for breaking curfew, and although such summonses would typically just call for a ticket, those who received these summonses were also detained and taken to holding cells.

=== Lawsuits ===
Several of the protesters hurt or otherwise affected by NYPD tactics during the protests filed lawsuits against the department, individual officers, the city, and/or de Blasio. Six of the cases, including a suit filed by Attorney General Letitia James, were consolidated by Judge Colleen McMahon in June 2021 and put on a faster schedule, slated to begin in early 2022. In the process, she decided that while the city could be sued, plaintiffs could not sue Commissioner Shea or Mayor de Blasio in their official capacity. A suit against retired Chief Monahan was allowed to move forward, based on his order to kettle protesters in the June 4 incident in the Bronx. City lawyers were threatened with sanctions for long delays providing requested information during the discovery phase of the trial, using techniques which The Intercept reported as part of a long-term pattern of failing to provide paperwork in cases related to the NYPD. The defense argued the cases should be dismissed on the basis of the legislation and other reforms which had been enacted since the protests. Judge McMahon ruled against the defense's motion in July 2021. A lawsuit against the NYPD by the woman shoved on May 29 was settled in early 2022 for $387,000.

== Legislation and policy proposals ==
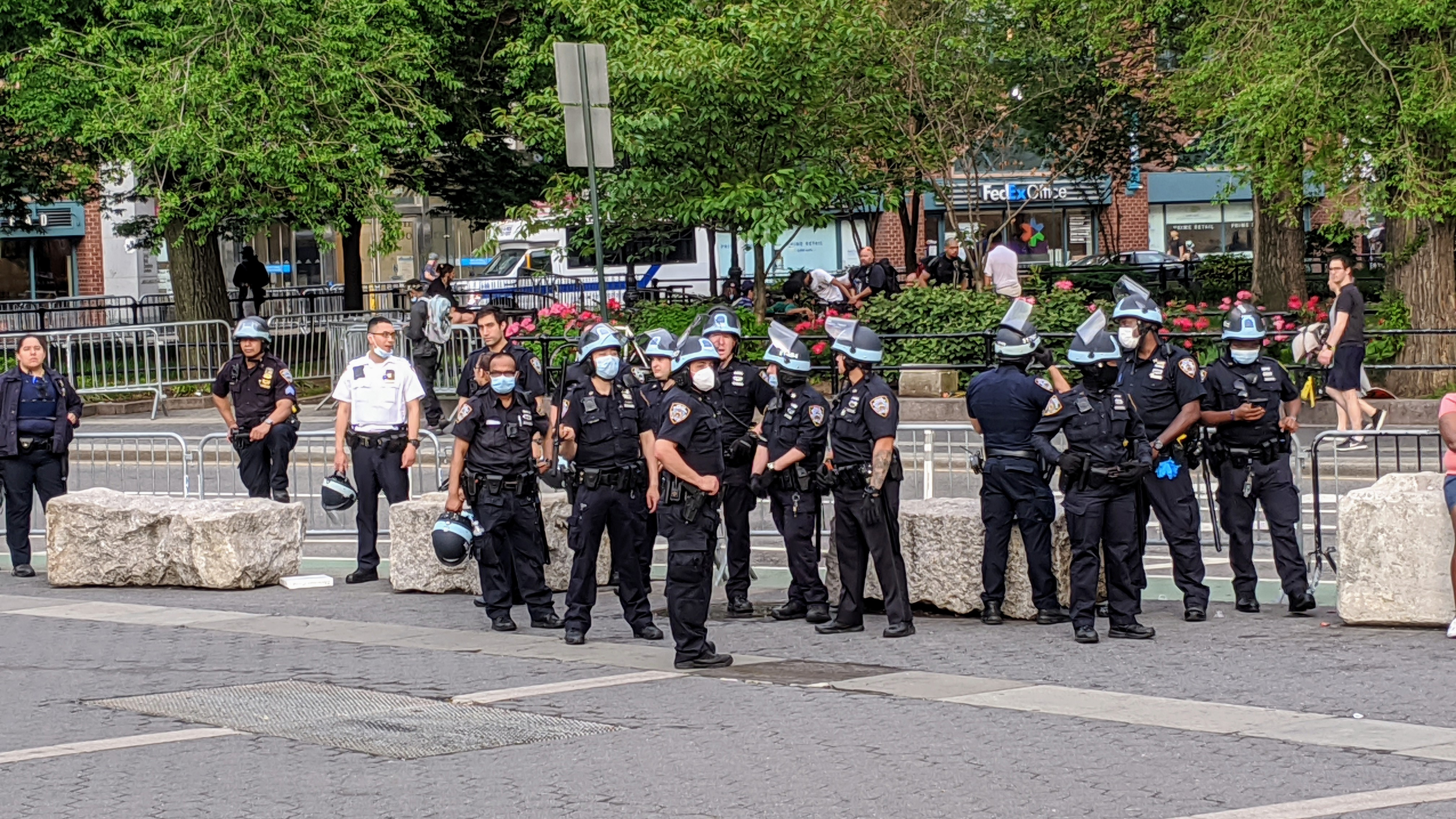
Police officers in riot gear in Union Square, Manhattan, on June 3

=== Anti-chokehold legislation ===
On June 3, Terrence Floyd, George Floyd's brother, spoke with Commissioner Shea by phone. Floyd urged Shea to adopt changes in NYPD practices, including supporting a ban on chokeholds and other techniques that involve neck restraint. The NYPD has been criticized for its use of chokeholds in the past, including in the fallout over the death of Eric Garner in 2014. Though disallowed by police policy, an investigation found officers had used them on several occasions and had experienced minimal or no consequences.

New York City Councilman Rory Lancman first proposed a bill which would criminalize chokeholds in 2014, but it was met with strong criticism from New York's powerful police unions and de Blasio threatened to veto it. In the wake of Floyd's murder, de Blasio expressed support as long as there were an exception for life-threatening circumstances.

On June 6, employees of the Mayor's Office of Criminal Justice issued a statement calling on the mayor to adopt certain strategies for police reform. Among them was support for legislation which would criminalize chokeholds. According to the Times, the bill was "believed to have a veto-proof majority in the [City] Council".

The New York City Council moved on June 8 to pass the legislation, with a scope went beyond its original ban, covering not just chokeholds but any action which "restricts the flow of air or blood by compressing the windpipe, diaphragm, or the carotid arteries" while making an arrest. The New York State Legislature also passed a bill named the "Eric Garner Anti-Chokehold Act". The city law is a misdemeanor charge, whereas the state law is a Class C felony.

=== Repeal of 50-a ===
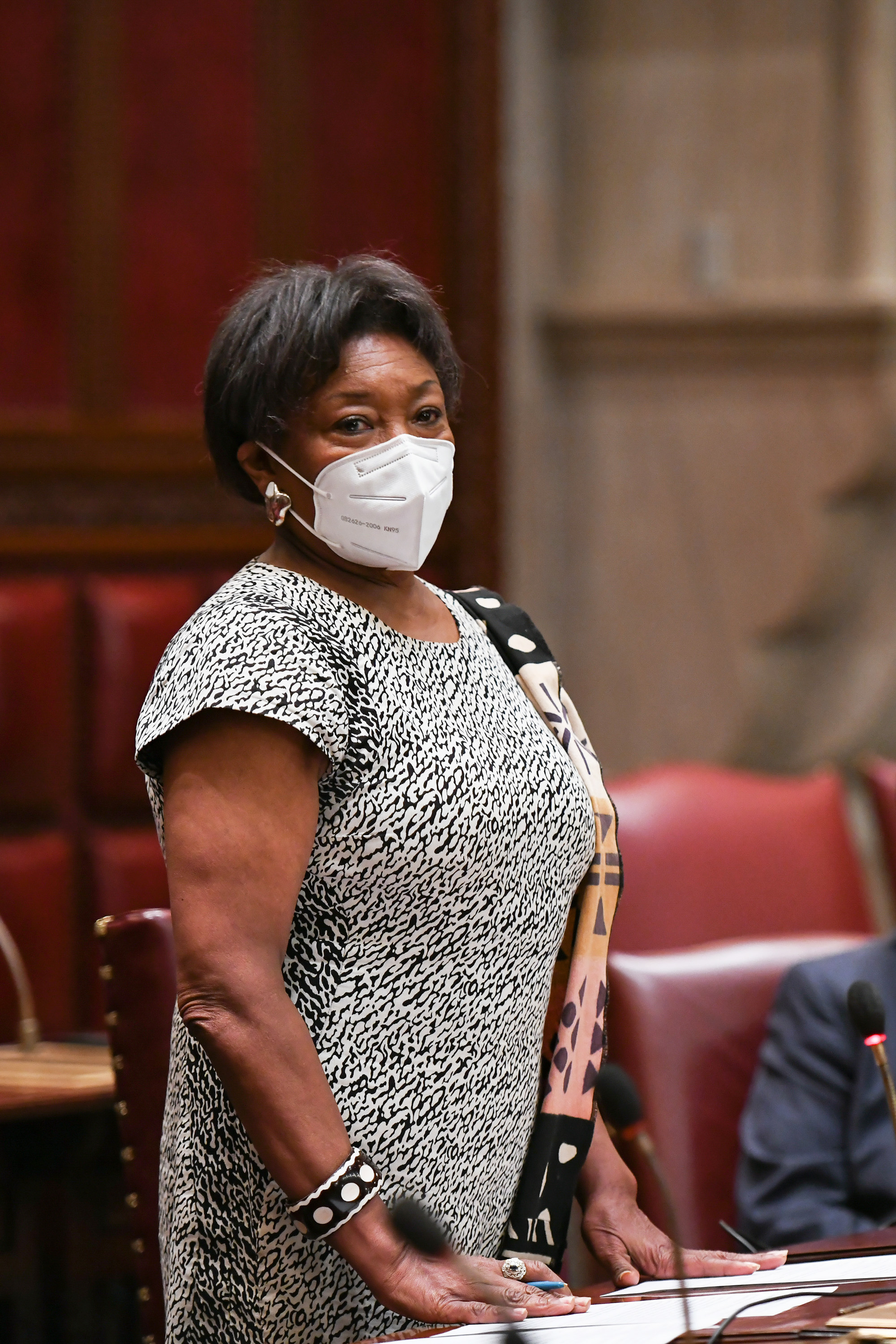
NYS Senate Majority Leader Andrea Stewart-Cousins on June 10

In the 1970s, New York state lawmakers enacted section 50-a of the New York Civil Rights Law, which requires permission by an officer or a judge in order to release any "personnel records used to evaluate performance" of that officer. In the past, the NYPD has worked to broaden the scope of the law to ensure disciplinary hearings could not be made public. Like the chokehold ban, there were significant efforts to repeal the law after the death of Eric Garner. The officer responsible for Garner's death, Daniel Pantaleo, had been the subject of many misconduct complaints that were kept from the public because of 50-a, until finally being leaked. New York State Assemblyman Daniel J. O'Donnell put forward a bill to repeal it, but it was not successful. Since then, organizations like The Legal Aid Society and Communities United for Police Reform have continued efforts to repeal, thus far unsuccessful. According to The New York Times's Gina Bellafante, it "was originally intended to shield good cops from vigilantes. But in practice it has protected habitually delinquent police officers for decades."

50-a was the subject of criticism again following Floyd's murder by Derek Chauvin, a police officer who had eighteen misconduct complaints on his official record. Minnesota, unlike New York, does not have a law like 50-a. The prospect of repeal was met by significant opposition by police unions, which expressed concern about unsubstantiated complaints being released. Governor Cuomo expressed support for the repeal, noting that he knew that support would be met with harsh criticism from unions, while de Blasio supported reform rather than repeal.

On June 9, the State Senate and Assembly passed a bill repealing 50-a. It passed the Senate on a vote of 48–22 during a special session after the official legislative session ended the month before. Patrick Lynch of the Police Benevolent Association objected to being left out of the discussion over the repeal. Governor Cuomo signed the bill into law on June 12 at a ceremony including Valerie Bell and Gwen Carr (mothers of Sean Bell and Eric Garner, respectively), NAACP President Hazel Dukes, Al Sharpton, and leaders from the State Senate and Assembly.

=== Defunding the NYPD ===
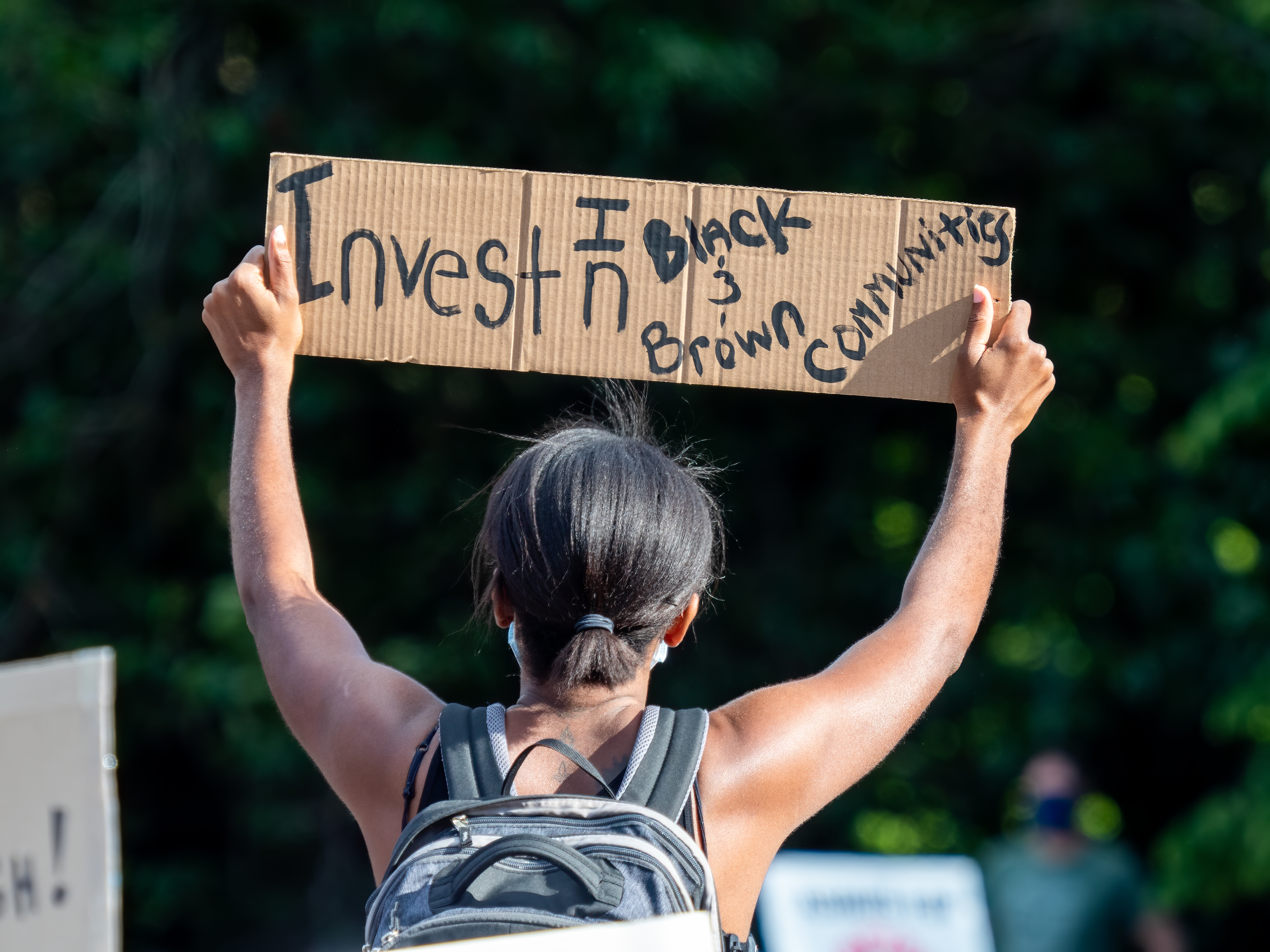
Protester holding a sign in Brooklyn: "Invest in black and brown communities"

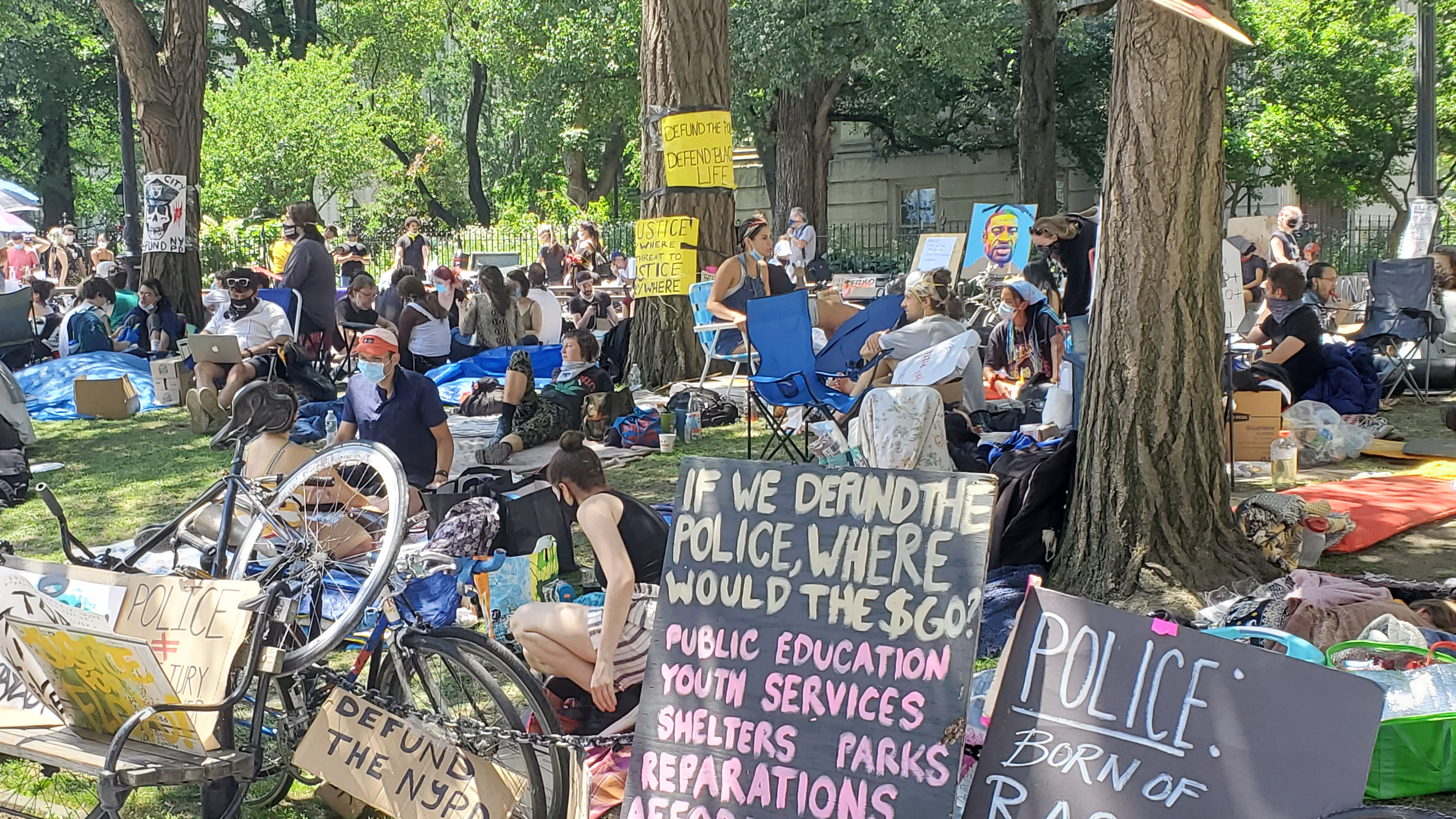
George Floyd protests in June 2020

On June 3, hundreds of former and current de Blasio administration staffers signed a statement regarding the police response to the protests. It made several demands including defunding the NYPD, decreasing its budget from $6 billion to $5 billion. Three days later, staffers on the administration's Office of Criminal Justice issued another statement which likewise called for specific reforms, again including defunding the NYPD. Defunding the police and moving part of the NYPD's budget to support communities in other ways was also one of the demands made by protesters. On June 7, de Blasio announced that "we are committed to shifting resources to ensure that the focus is on our young people" and "doing that ... in a way that we are certain continues to ensure that this city will be safe". The NYPD's annual budget is $6 billion, out of a total city budget of $90 billion. De Blasio did not specify how much funding would be diverted, and expressed intent to work with the City Council to come up with a plan before the July 1 budget deadline. On June 12, the City Council announced that it would be working to cut $1 billion from the budget for 2021. The Police Benevolent Association responded by saying "For decades, every time a city agency failed at its task, the city's answer was to take the job away and give it to the NYPD. if the City Council wants to give responsibilities back to those failing agencies, that's their choice. But they will bear the blame ... They won't be able to throw cops under the bus anymore."

As the budget deadline approached, protesters convened in City Hall Park to "Occupy City Hall", filling the park day and night to call for reducing the NYPD budget.

On June 30, the City Council passed a budget which removes $1 billion from the NYPD. It canceled plans to hire 1,160 new officers and transferred responsibility to monitor vending, homeless populations, and schools to other entities. According to The New York Times, the details of the budget "seemed to please no one". Those seeking reforms to policing did not think it went far enough, while others pointed to increasing crime rates in the city at the time. The budget did not cancel a different wave of police hiring planned for October 2020, while it did continue a freeze on many other city employees like teachers.

=== Other policing changes ===
On June 7, de Blasio announced that the enforcement of street vendor laws and regulations would no longer be carried out by the NYPD. Vendors have several times raised concerns about the way the city polices them, including an incident when police arrested a woman selling churros on the subway, which received media attention.

=== Reports ===
There have been four government reviews into the response to demonstrations. The first was released in July 2020 by state attorney general Letitia James; the second was internal to the NYPD and was not made public, the New York City Department of Investigation (DOI) published the third in December 2020; the Civilian Complaint Review Board released its report in February 2023.

==== Attorney General's report ====
On May 30, Governor Andrew Cuomo requested that Letitia James and the New York State Office of the Attorney General look into the NYPD's response to the George Floyd protests, following news of violence between police and demonstrators. The report, released in July, detailed incidents of violence and excessive force. Among its recommendations were ceasing the use of aggressive crowd control tactics like kettling, legislating rules about use of force otherwise coded only in the department's policies, and moving the responsibility for appointing police commissioners and overseeing hiring and firing of officers from the mayor's office to an independent panel. A spokesperson for de Blasio rejected the latter idea.

==== Department of Investigation report ====
The New York City Department of Investigation (DOI), an independent watchdog for city government, conducted a six-month probe into the actions of the NYPD during the George Floyd protests. It focused more on planning and response at an institutional level than specific incidents involving individual officers. The 111-page report, released in December 2020, was broadly critical of the department's handling of the events, saying that it "lacked a clearly defined strategy tailored to respond to the large-scale protests of police and policing" and "made a number of key errors or omissions that likely escalated tensions, and certainly contributed to both the perception and the reality that the department was suppressing rather than facilitating First Amendment assembly and expression". It found that too few officers were deployed at the early stages of the protests, and that officers were required to work long hours in unfamiliar neighborhoods under unfamiliar supervisors, often without adequate training for such events. Commanders relied on crowd control tactics that were too harsh, like kettling, mass arrests, long detentions, and the use of pepper spray and batons. With these, the report said, the department "often failed to discriminate between lawful, peaceful protesters and unlawful actors and contributed to the perception that officers were exercising force in some cases beyond what was necessary". It pointed to the kettling incident on June 4 in the Bronx as a case study of excessive force based on insufficient information. The report highlighted that the department did not acknowledge that police brutality and racism was driving the protests or factor that into its strategy. The report considered the curfew an exacerbating factor in the clashes between protesters and police, with officers receiving conflicting information from the mayor's office as to how it should be enforced. DOI commissioner Margaret Garnett said at a news conference that "the response really was a failure on many levels".

The report made several recommendations for the future, such as First Amendment rights training or policies and creating a special unit which would lead protest planning and response instead of the department's rapid-response unit, which is trained for dealing with terrorism and emergencies. When engaging with protesters, the DOI suggested improving communication, repeating dispersal orders more, and staging riot gear-clad officers out of public view. Commissioner Dermot Shea said he planned to incorporate all of the recommendations into department policy. Mayor de Blasio expressed agreement with the findings, adding that most officers nonetheless had done their jobs appropriately, and expressing "remorse" for his own role in how the protests were handled.

==== Civilian Complaint Review Board report ====
The Civilian Complaint Review Board, an independent agency which investigates complaints against NYPD officers, published a 590-page report on the department's response to the George Floyd protests in February 2023. In it, the agency recommended radical changes to the way officers are trained and respond to demonstrations. The report was partly based on 321 investigations based on 750 complaints they received. It found that officers struck protesters with batons against police protocol, used pepper spray indiscriminately, concealed names or badge numbers, and failed to properly use body cameras, recommending disciplinary action be taken against 138 officers for 146 incidents. Its recommendations focused on training, developing different tactics, and better documentation and instruction.

== Public health concerns ==
At the time the protests began, New York City was still experiencing high levels of transmission of SARS-CoV-2. Public officials expressed concern about the spread of COVID-19 via the crowded events. Protests can make social distancing difficult, and some common elements of such demonstrations, like chanting and yelling, can increase risk of transmission. In addition to risks taken by protesters, several outlets criticized police working the events for failing to wear face masks as required by policy and by order of the governor. The New York Times described a "confounding scene [that] has played out again and again" whereby "the protesters ... are mostly wearing masks [but] many of the police are not". As the number of arrests increased, many people were detained for long periods, sometimes held in close quarters where social distancing was impossible. Some of the arrested also had inadequate access to water to wash their hands. In some cases, policing has involved use of tear gas, which can lead to respiratory illness on its own, and can also increase risk by causing coughing. Street medics provided first aid to injured or sick participants in the protests, and some came equipped with hand sanitizer or personal protective equipment.

== Murals and memorials ==
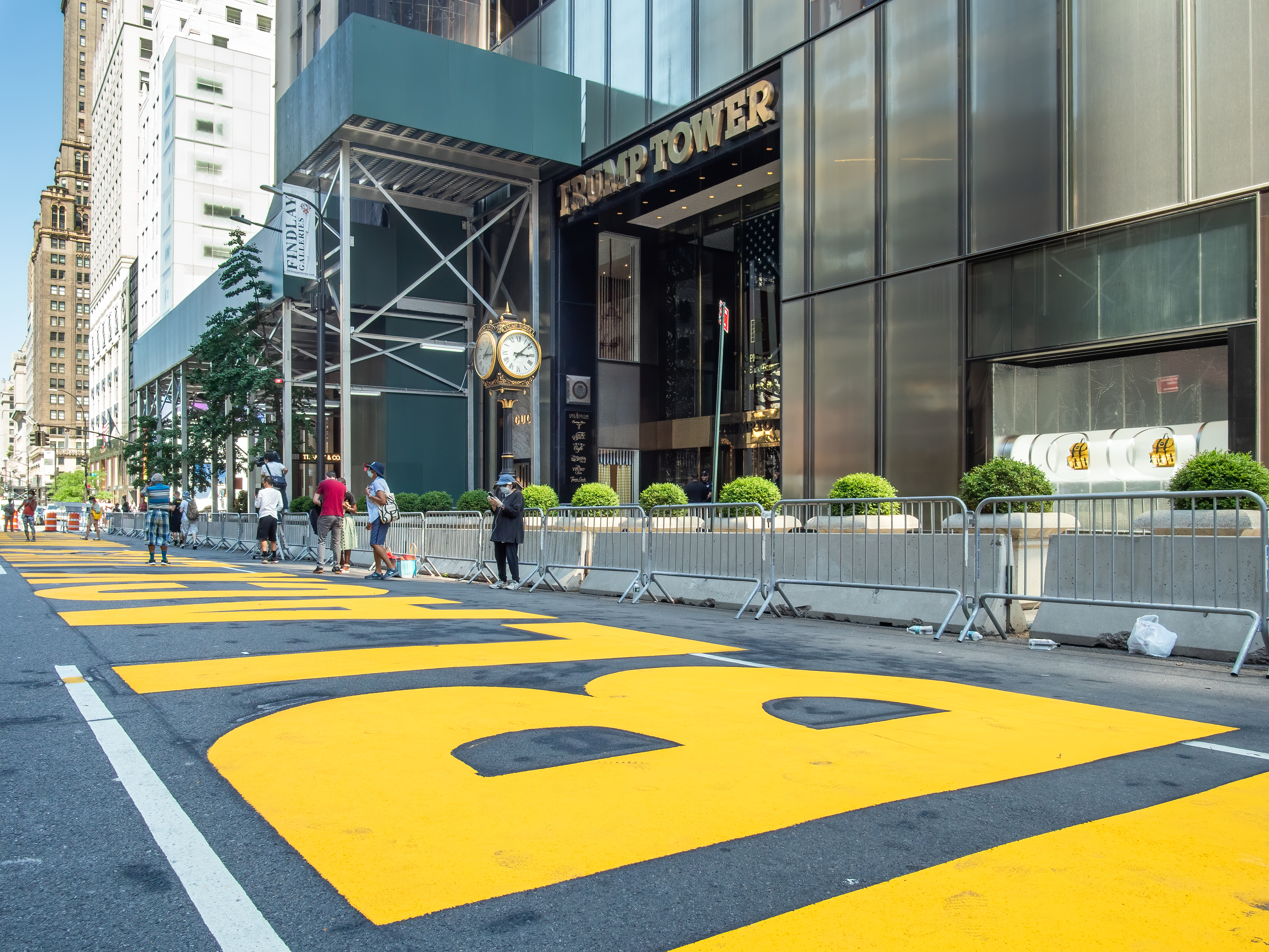
Trump Tower with Black Lives Matter mural painted in front in July 2020

Several memorials were created during and after the protests. On June 14, 2020, a Black Lives Matter mural was completed along Fulton Street in the Bedford-Stuyvesant neighborhood of Brooklyn. Volunteers painted the words "Black Lives Matter" in large yellow letters, accompanied by the names of people killed by racial violence like George Floyd. Another Black Lives Matter mural was painted by city officials on July 9, 2020, on 5th Avenue in Manhattan, directly in front of Trump Tower. Then-president Trump expressed his opposition to the mural after it was announced. In the weeks after it was painted, the mural was repeatedly vandalized and repainted. A George Floyd Tribute Wall was also erected on July 9 at the Schomburg Center for Research in Black Culture in Harlem. In the following days, community members dropped off letters, posters, flowers, sculptures, paintings, and candles at the wall, some of which were archived into the Schomburg's collection.

A statue of George Floyd was unveiled on Juneteenth in 2021 in the Flatbush neighborhood of Brooklyn. Days later, the six-foot (1.8 m) bust was vandalized, painting it black and tagging it with a Patriot Front stencil, the name of a far-right white supremacist group. Its display in Brooklyn was temporary, and it was moved to Union Square in Manhattan on October 1, where it was vandalized again shortly thereafter.
