= 50-a =

New York state law on police misconduct

New York State Legislature
- Full name: New York Civil Rights Law § 50-a
- Signed into law: 1976
- Section: 50-a

Status: Repealed

New York Civil Rights Law § 50-a was a section of the New York Civil Rights Law, enacted in 1976, which required the concealment of disciplinary records of police officers, firefighters, and prison officers from the public. Under the former law, any "personnel records" were "confidential and not subject to inspection or review," unless the officer granted permission for their release or a court order permitting access.

The stated rationale for the law was to protect law enforcement officers who served as witnesses for the prosecution in trials. In particular, the law was meant to protect officers from subpoenas seeking misconduct records issued by defense attorneys. Section 50-a was a major source of controversy from its enactment, with civil rights activists blaming it for a lack of police accountability, saying that it served to preserve institutional racism, and calling it one of the strongest police secrecy laws in the country.

On June 12, 2020, then-Governor Andrew Cuomo signed to repeal the law as part of New York State Assembly/Senate Bill A10611/S8496.

== Criticism ==
Critics have argued that the law was used to hide records of police misconduct and wrongdoing from the public and that this contributed to a culture in which misconduct by the New York City Police Department often goes unpunished and oversight is rare Media organizations complained also that the law created difficulty in investigating police misconduct as well.

According to the New York Civil Liberties Union, "50-a was arguably the worst law in the nation when it comes to the public's ability to access these records."

== Repeal ==
Beginning in 2014, following the killing of Eric Garner, a coalition of activists began to call for the repeal of Section 50-a. Some organizations that advocated for the repeal of the law include Communities United for Police Reform, New York Communities for Change, East Coast Coalition for Tolerance and Non-Discrimination, Make the Road New York, New York City Bar Association, the New York Civil Liberties Union, and Moms Rising. In 2016, Mayor Bill de Blasio issued a written statement that "public interest was disserved" by the law. Following the murder of George Floyd, large-scale protests began in many parts of the world, including in New York, calling for police reforms and police accountability.

On June 10, 2020, the New York State Legislature voted to repeal Section 50-a and on June 12, Governor Andrew Cuomo signed an act amending the Civil Rights Law to totally repeal Section 50-a.

== Aftermath ==
In July 2020, Judge Katherine Polk Failla of the United States District Court for the Southern District of New York temporarily blocked the release of records covered by the former Section 50-a. Failla issued the temporary restraining order upon the request of New York City police, fire and correctional unions, citing potential "employment" and "safety" issues.

Despite initially siding with the police unions and temporarily blocking release, Failla later decided that the release of records should be permitted prior to trial (with the exception of certain minor "technical infractions") and reversed most of the initial order. However, Failla also agreed to maintain the restraining order long enough for the unions to appeal the decision.

In February 2021, the United States Court of Appeals for the Second Circuit agreed that the records should be released. The Second Circuit ruling affirmed Failla's order and permitted almost all of the disclosures that the police unions wished to block, while maintaining the exception for technical infractions.

In January 2021, it was reported that police departments had continued to find ways to hide their discipline records. A joint effort by USA Today Network New York, MuckRock, Brechner Center for Freedom of Information, and Syracuse University journalism made a total of 600 record requests from 400 police agencies. Only 40 agencies provided records in response to the requests.

== See also ==
- California Senate Bill 1421
