= List of killings by law enforcement officers in the United States, March 2013 =

This is a list of people reported killed by non-military law enforcement officers in the United States in March 2013, whether in the line of duty or not, and regardless of reason or method. The listing documents the occurrence of a death, making no implications regarding wrongdoing or justification on the part of the person killed or officer involved. Killings are arranged by date of the incident that caused death. Different death dates, if known, are noted in the description. The table below lists 100 people.

== March 2013 ==
Date	Name (Age) of Deceased	Race	State (City)	Description
2013-03-31	Jonathan Lee Cunningham (35)	White	North Carolina (Raleigh)	
2013-03-31	Gregory Allen Bridges (44)	White	Texas (The Woodlands)	
2013-03-31	Melissa Anne Jenkins (60)	White	North Carolina (Tarboro)	
2013-03-30	Huggins, Broderick (32)	Black	California (Oakland)	Huggins, from Modesto, was fatally shot by an Alameda County sheriff's deputy after he refused to get out of the vehicle and drove off, dragging one of those deputies, who had been trying to undo Huggins' seat belt.
2013-03-30	Taurino Martinez Guevara (46)	Hispanic	California (Delano)	
2013-03-30	Tomas G. Ramirez Gonzalez (24)	Hispanic	Arizona (Phoenix)	
2013-03-29	Larry Albert Bohannon	White	New Hampshire (Walpole)	Bohannon, a suspect in a Vermont armed robbery was pursued and killed by gunshot wounds to the head, chest, and abdomen.
2013-03-29	Cody Ramseyer (49)	White	Utah (Willard)	
2013-03-29	Waylen J. Wealot (21)	White	Missouri (Kansas City)	
2013-03-28	Rick Marlowe (49)	White	Washington (Hoquiam)	
2013-03-28	Samuel E. George (53)	Unknown race	Maryland (Rawlings)	
2013-03-27	George Golden (42)	Black	Tennessee (Memphis)	
2013-03-27	Preston Phillips Jr. (72)	White	Arizona (Scottsdale)	
2013-03-26	Stahl, David "D.J." W., II (20)	White	Ohio (West Lafayette)	Three officers in two vehicles attempted a traffic stop on Stahl who was driving at a high speed. Stahl allegedly rammed one of the cruisers. Two officers from the other cruiser approached Stahl's vehicle on foot in an attempt to arrest him. Sheriff's Deputy Ernest Snyder shot and killed Stahl when he accelerated toward them, police say.
2013-03-26	Mark E. Warner (59)	Unknown race	Arizona (Buckeye)	
2013-03-25	John Arganda (43)	Unknown race	California (Pomona)	
2013-03-25	Wesley Davis (35)	White	New Mexico (Carlsbad)	
2013-03-25	Andres Castro-Badillo (25)	Hispanic	Georgia (Rocky Face)	
2013-03-24	Yanitza Luciano Bonilla (33)	Hispanic	Puerto Rico (Sabana Grande)	Agent Pedro Juan López Maldonado shot and killed his ex-wife, Luciano Bonilla, and another man, Ayala del Valle, in the parking lot of a baseball park. He then fatally shot himself.
2013-03-24	Omar Ayala del Valle (28)	Hispanic	Puerto Rico (Sabana Grande)	Agent Pedro Juan López Maldonado shot and killed his ex-wife, Luciano Bonilla, and another man, Ayala del Valle, in the parking lot of a baseball park. He then fatally shot himself.
2013-03-24	Khari Neville Illidge (25)	Black	Alabama (Phenix City)	
2013-03-23	Abel Reyna Jr. (69)	Unknown race	Texas (Lancaster)	
2013-03-23	Jimmy Wayne Birchfield (36)	White	Oklahoma (Enid)	
2013-03-22	Rhodes, Daniel (49)	Black	Florida (West Palm Beach)	
2013-03-22	Terrence Barry (49)	White	California (Castro Valley)	
2013-03-22	Smith, Russell (51)	Black	Washington (Seattle)	Members of the Bellevue Police Department SWAT team were serving a warrant at a Seattle home for the arrest of suspects in a series of robberies in Bellevue.
2013-03-20	Kenneth Knight (45)	Black	Indiana (Fort Wayne)	
2013-03-21	Matthew Cheyenne Simmons (28)	White	Texas (Hebbronville)	
2013-03-21	Ian Christopher Berrier (20)	White	California (Huntington Beach)	
2013-03-21	Howard Johnson Tungseth (87)	Unknown race	California (Modesto)	
2013-03-21	Theodore Jones IV (27)	White	Tennessee (Maryville)	
2013-03-21	Evan Spencer Ebel (28)	White	Texas (Decatur)	
2013-03-19	Barry Caldwell (42)	Black	South Carolina (Orangeburg)	
2013-03-19	Kendall Carroll (21)	Black	New Mexico (Albuquerque)	
2013-03-19	Ronald Manuel Ontiveros (37)	Hispanic	Utah (Salt Lake City)	
2013-03-19	David "Dizzy" Martinez (39)	Hispanic	California (Los Angeles)	
2013-03-19	Ryan Rogers (27)	Black	Illinois (East Hazel Crest)	
2013-03-19	Acre, Jeremy (35)	Unknown	Alabama (Deatsville)	Police responded to Acre's residence after receiving a call from a third party who claimed that there was a domestic dispute. When they arrived at the residence, the deputies knocked on the door and was met by Acre who was welding a handgun, Franklin said. Acre was told repeatedly to put his gun down, but he refused to comply. At some point during the exchange, a deputy deployed his Taser, which sent Acre to the ground, he said. But, before deputies could disarm Acre, he removed one of the probes and got back on his feet.When again Acre wouldn't put his gun down or be subdued, the supervisor fired his service weapon one time hitting Acre in the upper torso, Franklin said. Acre died at the scene.
2013-03-18	Meija, Elias (27)	Hispanic	California (San Jose)	Police were looking for Meija in connection with a homicide and spotted him in a stolen vehicle and blocked his car. Meija allegedly tried to ram his way out. San Jose officer Bruce Barthelemy shot and killed Meja after getting out of an unmarked police vehicle when Meja drove toward him.
2013-03-18	Transcini Richerson (30)	Black	Texas (Waco)	
2013-03-18	Alvarez, Jared Albert (32)	Hispanic	Texas (Houston)	Two Houston Police officers were on patrol when they observed Alvarez driving erratically. The officers initiated a traffic stop, but Alvarez refused to stop his vehicle and drove into a cul-de-sac at 600 Saddle Rock Drive. When Alvarez reached the end of the street he attempted to reverse his vehicle but became stuck on a large rock. One of the officers exited the squad car and began to approach Alvarez's vehicle on foot. As the officer was approaching, Alvarez pulled out a gun and shot the officer in both arms. The second officer discharged his weapon, fatally striking Alvarez.
2013-03-17	Bailey, Kevin M. (22)	Black	Ohio (Solon)	Bailey was shot four times by officers after fleeing a traffic stop, crashing his vehicle, and shooting at officers still in their cruisers.
2013-03-17	William Alfred Shaw (46)	White	Arizona (Phoenix)	
2013-03-16	Jeffrey Alan Langenhorst (50)	Unknown race	California (Ontario)	
2013-03-16	Sonia Angelita Castaneda-Montoya (28)	Hispanic	California (Pomona)	
2013-03-16	Esau Castellanos-Bernal (26)	Hispanic	Illinois (Chicago)	
2013-03-15	Jason Erling Hallstrom (41)	White	California (Santa Ana)	
2013-03-15	Angelo D. Moreno (27)	Unknown race	California (American Canyon)	
2013-03-15	Michael Marselle (45)	White	Georgia (Roswell)	
2013-03-15	Skyler Stewart (20)	Black	Pennsylvania (Paxtonia)	
2013-03-14	Myers, Kurt (64)	White	New York (Herkimer)	The Herkimer County shootings. On March 13, Myers started a fire in his apartment before going on a shooting spree, killing two people and wounding two others in a barbershop in Mohawk, New York, and killing two more at a car wash in the adjacent village of Herkimer. He was cornered in an abandoned bar in Herkimer. The standoff ended when Myers shot a police dog and the police returned fire, killing him.
2013-03-14	Clifford Jung Min Park (29)	Asian	California (Ventura)	
2013-03-14	Tyrique Rashad Johnson (21)	Black	Texas (Dallas)	
2013-03-14	Bradley Wilson (30)	White	Idaho (Chubbuck)	
2013-03-14	John Harris (58)	Black	Illinois (Chicago)	
2013-03-13	Rodriguez, Juan (44)	Hispanic	Florida (Miami)	
2013-03-13	Jones, Wayne Arnold (50)	Black	West Virginia (Martinsburg)	Jones was stopped by police while walking on South Queen Street. He told officers he was carrying a weapon. Jones did not comply with a search for the weapon and reportedly threatened the officers with a knife.
2013-03-13	Stephen P. Bethea (53)	White	Illinois (Bloomington)	
2013-03-13	Jose Manuel Cantu (78)	Hispanic	Texas (Del Valle)	
2013-03-13	Willie Lee Bingham Jr. (20)	Black	Mississippi (Cleveland)	
2013-03-12	Johnston, Daniel (58)	White	Connecticut (Willimantic)	Police were responding to a report of a man acting in a threatening manner. Officers arrived and found Johnston armed with a hatchet, and after a confrontation where Johnston refused to drop the hatchet, they shot and killed him.
2013-03-12	Austin Ryan Thomas (17)	Black	Michigan (Southfield)	
2013-03-12	Alvin T. Clark (47)	Unknown race	Nebraska (Valentine)	
2013-03-10	Whiting, Horace (61)	Black	Tennessee (Memphis)	Police responded to a call reporting an armed person. On arrival they found Whiting standing in the street holding a shotgun. Police stated that Whiting refused to drop the gun and, in fact, fired it instead, at which point they shot and killed him.
2013-03-10	Salameh, Taleb Hussein Yousef (28)	White	Iowa (North Liberty)	Police responded to a 911 call reporting domestic violence. When they arrived at the scene gunshots were exchanged, and Salameh was shot and killed.
2013-03-10	Rawls, Anthony (49)	Blacks	Georgia (Warner Robins)	Police allegedly received a call that Rawls had a gun and was threatening his wife. Officers shot and killed him outside his home.
2013-03-10	Dixon, Arthur, Jr. (43)	White	Florida (St. Petersburg)	Police were responding to a 911 call from a woman who said her son was threatening suicide. Two officers shot the man to death after he allegedly threatened them with a pair of scissors.
2013-03-10	Gilkerson, James L. (42)	White	Ohio (Middlefield)	Gilkerson was pulled over for a routine traffic stop when he got out and began shooting at two officers with an AK-47, police say. Both officers returned fire and killed him.
2013-03-10	Allen, Clinton	Black	Texas (Dallas)	Police were responding to a disturbance call involving Allen, whom they had dealt with before. Officer Clark Staller shot and killed Allen during a struggle between the two.
2013-03-10	Carlos Ribot (32)	Hispanic	New Jersey (Newark)	
2013-03-09	Dashaude J. Carr (19)	Black	Texas (Houston)	
2013-03-09	Gray, Kimani (16)	Black	New York (Brooklyn)	Gray and some other people were standing outside a building when they were approached by plainclothes officers. The officers stated that Gray attempted to leave the area when he saw them. They stated that he adjusted his waistband and "continued to act in a suspicious manner." The officers said that Gray then drew a gun and pointed it at them, at which point they shot and killed him. However, witness reports seem to contradict this story.
2013-03-09	Wright, Jeffrey Allen (55)	White	Florida (Navarre)	Wright was shot and killed by SWAT members Sgt. Nathan Hall, Deputy Brian Miller, and Detective Jerry Nash after allegedly pointing a pistol at them inside his home. Police were attempting to serve a felony warrant for counterfeiting. Wright barricaded himself in his home, and SWAT was called in.
2013-03-08	Khalid Bouaiti (44)	Black	New Jersey (Jersey City)	
2013-03-08	Jason Glover (32)	White	Louisiana (Abita Springs)	
2013-03-08	Jason Welch (34)	White	Nebraska (Omaha)	
2013-03-08	Thomas Hawes (45)	White	Arizona (Scottsdale)	
2013-03-08	Donohue, Adam (20)	Black	Florida (Boca Raton)	Officers attempted to pull over a taxi cab that was alleged to have been stolen by Donohue. A struggle then ensued, where Donohue was shot and tased. One of the officers suffered minor injuries.
2013-03-08	Saenz, Daniel (37)	White	Texas (El Paso)	An officer shot and killed Saenz, an inmate he was escorting to a hospital for a medical release. The two men allegedly got into a struggle before the officer shot him several times. Saenz was handcuffed at the time.
2013-03-07	Clifton Joel Day	White	Florida (Jacksonville)	Trying to repeatedly smash his ex-wife's car, the SWAT officers came to the scene. She told police he was trying to kill her. He had a gun, police told him to put it down, and later when he tried to reach for it they fired at him six times, killing him.
2013-03-07	William Washington (32)	Unknown race	Pennsylvania (Philadelphia)	
2013-03-06	Ayala, Ramon (27)	Hispanic	Washington (Sunnyside)	Officers responded to a report of a man shooting a gun into the air on a busy street corner. An officer shot and killed Ayala when he ignored their commands and allegedly pointed the gun towards them.
2013-03-06	Scott Edward Evans (40)	White	Tennessee (New Market)	
2013-03-06	Eckel, Brandon Wesley (27)	Unknown	California (Livingston)	Police pulled Eckel over after witnessing him littering and threatened to tow his truck because of a suspended license. Eckel drove away and a high-speed chase ensued, ending when Eckel crashed his truck. Police say he pulled out a rifle and pointed it at officers, who fired at him. Officers later stated that Eckel shot himself when the police began firing at him.
2013-03-06	Kelley, Eulice Troy (47)	White	Georgia (Columbus)	Police were responding to a domestic dispute. Officers shot and killed Kelley after he allegedly fired a weapon at them.
2013-03-05	Dennison, Parrish (41)	White	New Mexico (Albuquerque)	Dennison ran from police after being confronted while allegedly trying to sell stolen property. Police claim that he pointed a handgun at them as he was running. The Albuquerque SWAT team locked down the area. Police stated that when they located Dennison he ran toward them with a gun in his hand, at which point they shot and killed him.
2013-03-05	Terence Anderson (37)	Black	Missouri (St. Louis)	
2013-03-05	Richard J. Aubin (28)	White	New York (North Hudson)	
2013-03-04	Cisneros, Santiago A., III (32)	Hispanic	Oregon (Portland)	Cisneros was shot and killed by Officers Brad Kula and Michele Boer in a parking garage after allegedly firing a shotgun at them.
2013-03-04	Garza, Jimmy James, Jr. (31)	Hispanic	Texas (San Antonio)	Garza was shot after a SWAT standoff when he reportedly bolted from his home toward officers while holding a rifle. Police were responding to a report that he had assaulted his ex-girlfriend.
2013-03-04	Meeks, Anthony Desean (22)	Black	North Carolina (Concord)	The U.S. Marshals Service, FBI, and local police were responding to a tip about a wanted suspect and allegedly found Meeks at a window with a gun. They shot and killed him after he reportedly came out of the window with the gun.
213-03-03	Lowry, Jeffrey (43)	White	Florida (Fort Lauderdale)	
2013-03-03	Stoddard-Nunez, Shawn Joseph Jetmore (19)	White	California (Hayward)	Stoddard-Nunez was riding with 24-year-old Arthur Pakman to a friend's house when police attempted a traffic stop and Pakman allegedly rammed his car into a police cruiser. The officer fired into the vehicle and hit Stoddard-Nunez twice, killing him. Police say they seek to charge Pakman with his friend's death.
2013-03-02	McMillan, Jesse Ray (26)	White	Washington (Kelso)	Police were investigating a hit-and-run incident where the driver, McMillan, had fled into a nearby residence. He eventually came outside and allegedly began firing, striking Kelso officer Ralph Hines in the leg. Hines and Cowlitz County Sheriff's Deputy Danny O'Neill shot and killed McMillan.
2013-03-02	Smith, Amos G. (26)	Black	California (Union City)	Smith was pulled over by officers and attempted to flee, police say. Police shot and killed him after he allegedly pointed a gun at officers.
2013-03-02	Aduddell, Ronald (28)	White	California (San Jose)	Police attempted a traffic stop when they felt a vehicle looked suspicious, and a chase ensued. After reportedly ramming several police cars, Aduddell got out of the vehicle and was shot to death by Officers Ian Cooley and Adam Jenkins, who say his hands were on his waistband area. Police did not locate a weapon at the scene.
2013-03-02	Sawyer, Aaron (23)	White	California (San Francisco)	Daly City police spotted Sawyer behind the wheel of a stolen vehicle and chased him into San Francisco. Sawyer eventually abandoned the car and fled on foot. After Sawyer allegedly raised a gun at officers, a Daly City officer shot him in the torso, killing him.
2013-03-01	Patterson, Marcus Dewayne (35)	Black	Oklahoma (Oklahoma City)	Police say they were responding to a call about a possible drug deal when Sgt. Charles Schamel, an undercover officer, shot and killed a person driving a car. Patterson, the driver, allegedly attempted to run over Schamel.
2013-03-01	Schaefer, John (70)	White	Texas (Austin)	Schaefer called police to report being attacked by a pit bull in his yard that was not his. Officer Jonathan Whitted shot and killed Schaefer when he refused to surrender his pistol to the officer and allegedly pointed it at him. Schaefer was an instructor at the Austin Rifle Club.
2013-03-01	Myers, Daniel John (47)	White	Texas (El Paso)	Myers was killed in a shootout with El Paso police and a US Border Patrol Agent. He was wanted for robbery charges in Michigan.

== See also ==
- Death in custody § United States
- Henry A. Wallace Police Crime Public Database
- List of cases of police brutality
- List of countries with annual rates and counts for killings by law enforcement officers
- List of law enforcement officers killed in the line of duty in the United States
- List of law enforcement officers convicted for an on-duty killing in the United States
- List of shootings by US immigration agents
- List of police reforms related to the George Floyd protests
- List of unarmed African Americans killed by law enforcement officers in the United States
- Lists of killings by law enforcement officers
- Police brutality in the United States
- Police misconduct § United States
- Police riot § United States
- Police use of deadly force in the United States
