= National Fraternal Order of Police =

US fraternal organization of police officers

Fraternal Order of Police
- National Fraternal Order of Police
- FOP star
- Abbreviation: FOP
- Founded: 1915
- Headquarters: Nashville, Tennessee
- Location: United States
- Members: 373,000 (2023)
- Key people: Patrick Yoes (President)
- Website: fop.net

The National Fraternal Order of Police (FOP) is a fraternal organization consisting of sworn law enforcement officers in the United States. It reports a membership of over 355,000 members organized in 2,100 local chapters (lodges), state lodges, and the national Grand Lodge. The organization attempts to improve the working conditions of law enforcement officers and the safety of those they serve through education, legislation, information, community involvement, and employee representation.

FOP subordinate lodges may be police unions and/or fraternal organizations, as the FOP has both Labor Lodges and Fraternal Lodges, and describes itself as a "full service member representation organization." It lobbies Congress and regulatory agencies on behalf of law enforcement officers, provides labor representation, promotes legal defense for officers, and offers resources such as "legal research."

== History ==
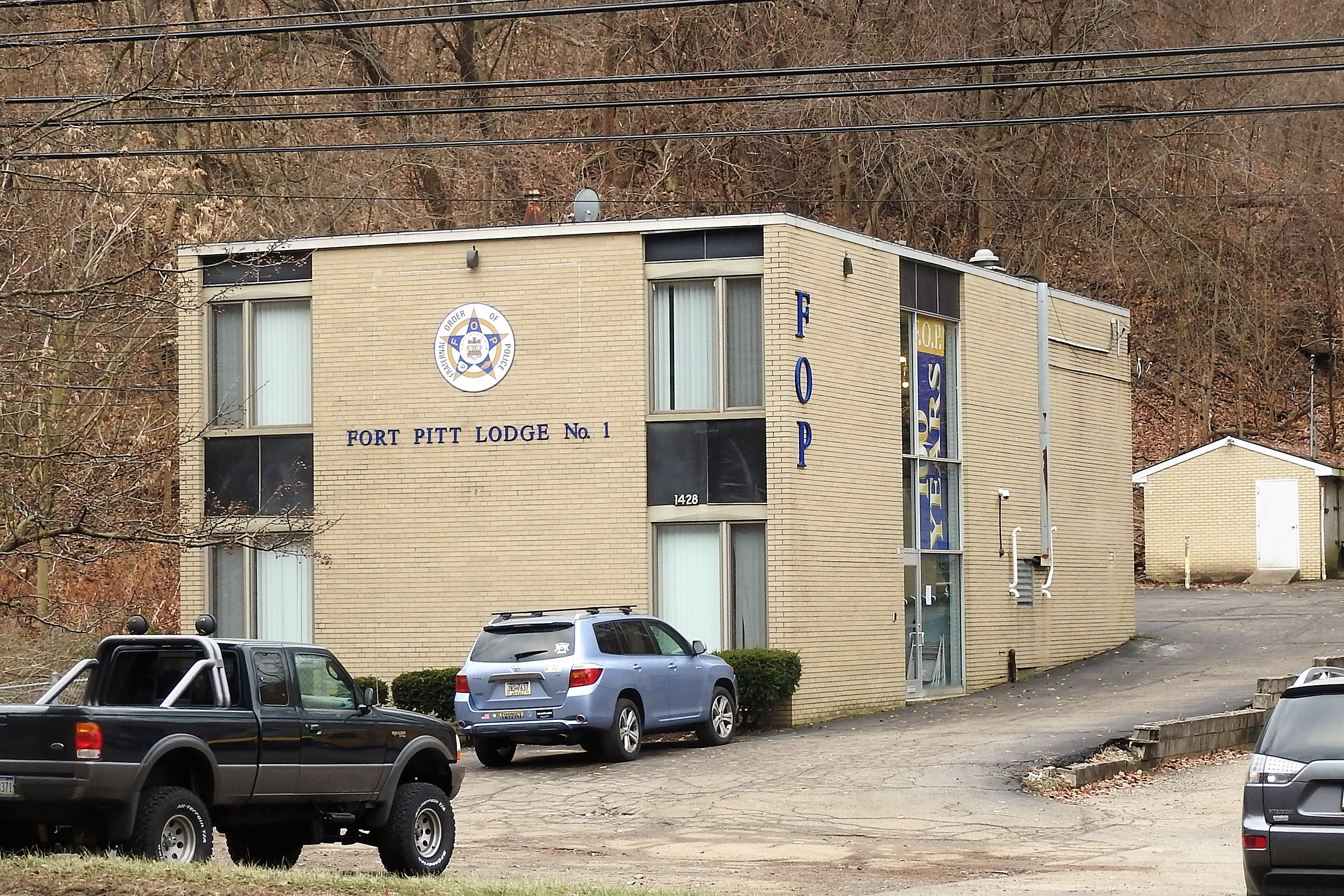
Fort Pitt Lodge # 1, Pittsburgh

The Fraternal Order of Police was founded in 1915 by two Pittsburgh, Pennsylvania, patrol officers, Martin Toole and Delbert Nagle. They and 21 other members of the Pittsburgh Bureau of Police met on May 14, 1915, establishing the first local of the Fraternal Order of Police, Fort Pitt Lodge #1. The FOP official history states that the founders decided to not use the term "union" because of "the anti-union sentiment of the time," but nevertheless acted as a union, telling Pittsburgh mayor Joseph G. Armstrong that the FOP would "bring our grievances before the Mayor or Council and have many things adjusted that we are unable to present in any other way...we could get many things through our legislature that our Council will not, or cannot give us."

In 1918, it was decided that the Order should become a national organization. The Order's constitution stated that "Race, Creed or Color shall be no bar". The constitution also had a no strike pledge, but this has not been enforced since 1967 when FOP police in Youngstown, Ohio refused to work during a salary dispute. In 1974 and 1975 the FOP stated that it would take no action against members who violated the anti-strike clause until all efforts were exhausted on the local and state level.

During the 1960s the FOP opposed the creation of police review boards, spearheaded by Robert F. Kennedy, at one point describing them as a "sinister movement against law enforcement". The FOP also clashed with the American Civil Liberties Union (ACLU) on the issue of police brutality, seeing it as a "liberal attempt to discredit law enforcement". The Order was "heartened by Richard Nixon's emphasis on law and order", though it claimed to remain strictly apolitical.

== Emblem and motto ==
The Fraternal Order of Police emblem is a five-pointed star. According to the FOP:

The five-cornered star tends to remind us of the allegiance we owe to our Flag and is a symbol of the authority with which we are entrusted. It is an honor the people we serve bestow upon us. They place their confidence and trust in us; serve them proudly.
Midway between the points and center of the star is a blue field representative of the thin blue line protecting those we serve. The points are of gold, which indicates the position under which we are now serving. The background is white, the unstained color representing the purity with which we should serve. We shall not let anything corrupt be injected into our order. Therefore, our colors are blue, gold and white.
The open eye is the eye of vigilance ever looking for danger and protecting all those under its care while they sleep or while awake. The clasped hands denote friendship. The hand of friendship is always extended to those in need of our comfort. The circle surrounding the star midway indicates our never ending efforts to promote the welfare and advancement of this order. Within the half circle over the centerpiece is our motto, "Jus, Fidus, Libertatum" which translated means "Law is a Safeguard of Freedom."

When adopted, the motto was believed to be Latin and assumed to mean "Fairness, Justice, Equality" or "Justice, Friendship, Equality". Actually, the motto is a grammatically impossible and hardly translatable sequence of Latin words; the current interpretation is the best that could be made of it.

In the center of the star is the coat of arms of Pittsburgh, itself based on William Pitt's own coat of arms.

== Organization and membership ==
The FOP constitution and bylaws provide that active membership is open to "any regularly appointed or elected and full-time employed law enforcement officer of the United States, any state or political subdivision thereof, or any agency may be eligible for membership" and that "each state and subordinate lodge shall be the judge of its membership." Local lodges often have provisions for retired law enforcement officers. The subordinate lodges are supported by state lodges which are subordinate to the Grand Lodge. The Grand Lodge is the national structure of the order.

In 1978, the Order had 138,472 members, 1,250 lodges and 34 state structures.

In the late 1970s, the Order's headquarters were located in Indianapolis, Indiana. The national organization has three offices: the Labor Services Division in Columbus, Ohio, the Steve Young Law Enforcement Legislative Advocacy Center in Washington, D.C., and the Grand Lodge "Atnip-Orms Center" National Headquarters in Nashville, Tennessee.

=== Fraternal Order of Police Auxiliary ===
The Fraternal Order of Police Auxiliary (FOPA) is the auxiliary organization of FOP for family members of FOP members. It was formed by a group of wives of Pittsburgh police officers in 1920, and Kathryn M. Milton became its first national president, in 1941 as the Fraternal Order of Police Ladies Auxiliary. It reports over 2,000 members in 140 Auxiliaries in 25 states. In 1985, males older than 18 were admitted for the first time; in 1987, the current name was adopted, dropping the term "Ladies."

=== Fraternal Order of Police Associates ===
The Fraternal Order of Police Associates (FOPA) is a civilian affiliate organization that is made up of FOP supporters not eligible for membership. Its members include friends and family of members, businesspeople, professionals, and other citizens. It is a 501(c)(3) tax-exempt organization.

== Political advocacy ==
Passed legislation supported by FOP includes the Law Enforcement Officers Safety Act, Law Enforcement Officers Equity Act, and HELPS Retirees Act. Pending legislation that FOP lobbies for includes the Social Security Fairness Act, the Public Safety Employer-Employee Cooperation Act of 2007, and the State and Local Law Enforcement Officers' Discipline, Accountability and Due Process Act.

The FOP distributes questionnaires for candidates for U.S. president and Congress asking them about their views on issues relating to police officers.

FOP has the following issue positions:

- Supports the Social Security Fairness Act, which would repeal the Windfall Elimination Provision (WEP) and the Government Pension Offset (GPO) in current law.
- Supports the recommendations of the President's Commission To Strengthen Social Security to privatize Social Security, and opposes "mandating participation in the Social Security system for either current or newly hired state and local government employees that do not currently participate in Social Security.
- Supports "minimal collective bargaining rights for public safety employees," including law enforcement officers and firefighters, and supports the Public Safety Employer-Employee Cooperation Act of 2007.
- Supports due process rights of law enforcement officers in non-criminal administrative proceedings and supports the State and Local Law Enforcement Discipline, Accountability and Due Process Act.
- Supports the Law Enforcement Officers Equity Act, which would expand the definition of "law enforcement officer" under the Civil Service Retirement System and the Federal Employees Retirement System to include all U.S. federal police officers, as well as Customs and Immigration Inspectors.
- Supports the REAL ID Act.
- In response to the 2014 murders of NYPD policemen, then President Chuck Canterbury asked Congress to consider making crimes against police officers fall under the category of hate crimes.

In 2008, the president of the Fraternal Order of Police Lodge No. 53, Eddison Ricketts, wrote Broward County Sheriff Scott Israel that the union supported him.

On September 16, 2016, the FOP endorsed Republican Party candidate Donald Trump for U.S. president. This endorsement was opposed by Blacks in Law Enforcement of America for not reflecting the will of the membership. It endorsed Trump again on September 4, 2020.

During the COVID-19 pandemic, the FOP vehemently opposed vaccine requirements for police. COVID-19 was the top killer of police officers in 2020 and 2021.

On September 6, 2024, The FOP officially endorsed Donald Trump's 2024 presidential campaign. This marks the third time the police union has backed Trump. One of President Trump's first decisions when he returned to office was to grant blanket clemency to more than 1,500 people convicted for their role in the January 6 attack on the U.S. Capitol. The FOP criticized the move, saying it "sends a dangerous message."

=== Boycotts ===
The National Fraternal Order of Police has called for boycotts of various individuals and organizations throughout its history. In August 1999, the Fraternal Order of Police called for a boycott against all individuals and organizations that support Mumia Abu-Jamal, a journalist who was convicted of killing a Philadelphia police officer in 1981. FOP also called for a boycott of the Beastie Boys and Rage Against the Machine for their support of Abu-Jamal. In August 2007, FOP called for a boycott of eBay for selling police equipment. In 2015, the Fraternal Order of Police called for a boycott of Quentin Tarantino's films following his comments against police brutality at a protest in New York. The boycott of Tarantino was joined by the Border Patrol, as well as police unions in California, Philadelphia, New York, and New Jersey. After athletic company Nike aired an ad featuring former NFL player Colin Kaepernick in 2018, FOP condemned it and called it an insult. Fraternal Order of Police president Chuck Canterbury said Kaepernick's views were "uninformed and inflammatory" but declined to call for a boycott, saying that "in our experience, boycotts and similar exercises do not succeed and often serve only to enrich the company." Aside from the national organization, many local police unions have separately called for boycotts.

== Data breach ==
In January 2016, the site was hacked and files released to a dark web activist known as Cthulhu.

== Controversies ==
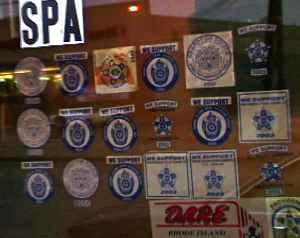
Front door of a Providence spa with multiple police stickers

In 1991, the FOP was under scrutiny from the public in part because of the Rodney King incident. Dewey Stokes, the FOP president at the time, contextualized the incident by saying, "You have to put things in proper perspective. [...] These are not common occurrences. They are the result of stress on the job, emphasis of the system on the criminal and not the victim, and the media's exploitation of the negatives of law enforcement."

The human rights group Amnesty International has criticized the Fraternal Order of Police in Philadelphia for their vocal support of the death penalty in the case of Mumia Abu-Jamal.

Then New York mayor Michael Bloomberg has called the FOP a "fringe organization" for opposing his efforts to repeal the Tiahrt Amendment.

On September 18, 2009, The Providence Journal reported the Fraternal Order of Police representing several Rhode Island police departments had solicited donations from city massage parlors or "spas". Watchdog groups have claimed that these massage parlors are fronts for prostitution.

On August 27, 2017, as the FOP was holding its annual conference at the Gaylord Opryland Resort & Convention Center in Nashville, Tennessee, protesters compared the FOP to the Ku Klux Klan by putting up banners on interstate overpasses, one of which read, "Grand Wizards to Grand Lodges. White Supremacy By Another Name".

In June 2018, Fraternal Order of Police Tri-County Lodge #3 in South Carolina objected to the inclusion of award-winning novel The Hate U Give by Angie Thomas, and All American Boys by Jason Reynolds and Brendan Kiely in a high school summer reading list, because of their depictions of violence by police officers. The National Coalition Against Censorship offered the high school support, while prominent authors such as Hari Kunzru and Neil Gaiman pointed out the alarming nature of police officers trying to police what children read.

After the May 2020 murder of George Floyd in Minneapolis Police custody, the FOP said, in part: "...police officers should at all times render aid to those who need it... need to treat all of our citizens with respect and understanding and should be held to the very highest standards for their conduct..." In June 2020, the Fraternal Order of Police's Brevard County, Florida chapter offered on Facebook to recruit police officers from forces involved in police brutality controversies from Buffalo, Atlanta, and Minneapolis. The Brevard County sheriff denounced the remarks.

In October 2020, the FOP posted a photo to Twitter and Facebook of a policewoman holding a toddler, claiming he had been found wandering the streets of Philadelphia amid the protests over the killing of Walter Wallace. The toddler had in fact been pulled from the back of a vehicle unrelated to the protests after the police had surrounded it and violently arrested his mother and another passenger without probable cause. The posts were later deleted.

On April 15, 2021, the same day Chicago Police Department body camera footage of the Adam Toledo shooting was released, John Catanzara, president of Lodge 7 Chicago of the Fraternal Order of Police, said the officer was justified in his actions. "He was 100% right," Catanzara said. "The offender still turned with a gun in his hand." This claim is heavily disputed as the video appears to show Toledo turning toward the officer and raising both hands with nothing in them when he was shot and killed.

On August 13, 2023, HBO released Telemarketers, a 3-part limited documentary series exploring the controversial telemarketing and fundraising practices of various state and local lodges of the Fraternal Order of Police nationwide. The series and investigation stars former heroin addict and legendary telemarketer Patrick J. Pespas, and graffiti artist turned filmmaker Sam Lipman-Stern.

On September 6, 2024, FOP officially endorsed Donald Trump for the 2024 US Presidential Election. This endorsement was criticized as some people felt Trump was responsible for the January 6 United States Capitol attack and was also found guilty of falsifying business records. More than 60 other police officials endorsed Harris. On January 21, 2025, FOP made an official statement denouncing Trump for the pardon of January 6 United States Capitol attack defendants.

== See also ==
- Fraternal Order of Police v. City of Newark
- Fraternal Order of Police of Ohio
- Peace Officers Memorial Day
- Steve Young Memorial Scholarship Program
- Telemarketers—Documentary series on HBO
