= Police brutality in the United States =

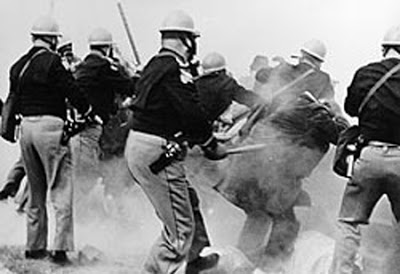
March 7, 1965: Alabama police attack the Selma to Montgomery marchers on "Bloody Sunday".

Police brutality is the use of excessive or unwarranted force by law enforcement, resulting in physical or psychological harm to a person. It includes beatings, killing, intimidation tactics, racist abuse, and/or torture.

In the 2000s, the federal government attempted tracking the number of people killed in interactions with US police, but the program was defunded. In 2006, a law was passed to require reporting of homicides at the hands of the police, but many police departments do not obey it. Some journalists and activists have provided estimates, limited to the data available to them. In 2019, 1,004 people were shot and killed by police according to The Washington Post, whereas the Mapping Police Violence project counted 1,098 killed. Statista claimed that in 2020, 1,021 people were killed by police, while the project Mapping Police Violence counted 1,126. From 1980 to 2018, more than 30,000 people have died by police violence in the United States, according to a 2021 article published in The Lancet. For 2023, Mapping Police Violence counted at least 1,247 individuals killed, making it the deadliest year on record. In the US, police have killed more people compared to any other industrialized democracy, with a disproportionate number of people shot being people of color. Since 2015, around 2,500 of those killed by police were fleeing.

Since the 20th century, there have been many public, private, and community efforts to combat police corruption and brutality. These efforts have identified various core issues that contribute to police brutality, including the insular culture of police departments (including the blue wall of silence), the aggressive defense of police officers and resistance to change in police unions, the broad legal protections granted to police officers (such as qualified immunity), the historic racism of police departments, the militarization of the police, the adoption of tactics that escalate tension (such as zero tolerance policing and stop-and-frisk), the inadequacies of police training and/or police academies, and the psychology of possessing police power. The US legal doctrine of qualified immunity has been widely criticized as "[having] become a nearly failsafe tool to let police brutality go unpunished and deny victims their constitutional rights," as summarized in a 2020 Reuters report.

Regarding solutions, activists and advocates have taken different approaches. Those who advocate for police reform offer specific suggestions to combat police brutality, such as body cameras, civilian review boards, improved police training, demilitarization of police forces, and legislation aimed at reducing brutality (such as the Justice in Policing Act of 2020). Those who advocate to defund the police call for the full or partial diversion of funds allocated to police departments, which would be redirected toward community and social services. Those who advocate to dismantle the police call for police departments to be dismantled and rebuilt from the ground up. Those who advocate to abolish police departments call for police departments to be disbanded entirely and to be replaced by other community and social services.

== History ==
=== Slave patrols roots ===
In the Southern United States, some of the earliest roots of policing can be found in slave patrols. Beginning in the 18th century, white volunteers developed slave patrols (also known as "paddyrollers"), which were squadrons that acted as vigilantes. In 1704, the first slave patrol was established in South Carolina. Eventually, all states with legal slavery had slave patrols, and they functioned as the first publicly funded police force in the South. These patrols focused on enforcing discipline and policing of African-American slaves. They captured and returned fugitive slaves, quashed slave rebellions, terrorized slaves in order to prevent rebellions (including beatings and searches of slave lodges), broke up slave meetings, and kept slaves off roadways. The patrols also administered discipline of indentured servants. The patrols had broad influence and powers; they could forcefully enter any person's house, if they suspected the person of sheltering fugitive slaves. During the American Civil War, slave patrols remained in place. After the Civil War, in the Reconstruction period, the former slave patrol groups joined with other white militias and groups, such as the Ku Klux Klan. Meanwhile, early police forces of the South began to take on the role of policing and regulating the movement of African-Americans who had gained their freedom. New laws were put in place to restrict their rights, which were known as Black Codes. According to some historians, the transition from slave patrols to police forces in the South was a seamless one.

=== Texas Rangers ===
In 1823, the Texas Rangers was established by Stephen F. Austin. The Rangers used violence, harassment, and intimidation to protect the interests of white colonists. They worked in an area that was governed by Mexico, which later became the Republic of Texas, followed by the state of Texas. The Rangers were known to be particularly active across the Mexico-United States border. Their work included capturing indigenous people who were accused of attacking white settlers, investigating crimes such as cattle raiding, and raiding Mexican vaquero cattle ranches. They intimidated Mexican and Mexican-American people into leaving their land and homes, in support of white colonial expansion. In the late 19th and early 20th centuries, the Texas Rangers supported and participated in extrajudicial killings and lynch mobs, such as La Matanza (1910–1920) and Porvenir massacre (1918).

=== Early police departments ===
In 1838, the United States developed its first formal police department, located in Boston. This was followed by New York City (1845), San Francisco (1849), Chicago (1851), New Orleans (1853), Cincinnati (1853), Philadelphia (1855), Newark, New Jersey (1857), Baltimore (1857). By the 1880s, all major US cities had police departments. As written by Dr. Garry Potter, "Early American police departments shared two primary characteristics: they were notoriously corrupt and flagrantly brutal. This should come as no surprise in that police were under the control of local politicians." The local political ward leader, who was often a tavern owner or gang leader, would appoint the chief of police of a neighborhood. The chief would be expected to follow the orders and expectations of the ward leader, which often included intimidating voters, harassing political opponents, and ensuring that the ward's business interests remained intact. The police officers typically had little qualifications or training as law enforcement officers, and they often took bribes and kickbacks. If conflicts arose, it was common for police officers to use force and brutality.

In the 19th century, police brutality was often directed at European immigrant communities, particularly those from Ireland, Italy, Germany, and Eastern Europe. The different cultures of these communities were often framed as "dangerous", which called for the enforcement of law and order. For example, Irish immigrants were considered a "dangerous" class, and they experienced discrimination by nativists. Meanwhile, organized crime and political parties were often intertwined, and police typically cast a blind eye toward gambling and prostitution, if managed by politically influential figures.

=== Strike breaking ===
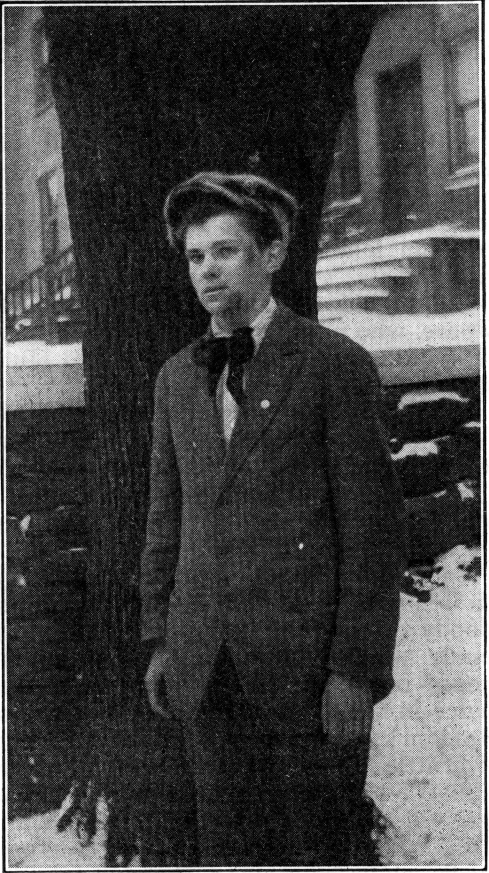
Person beaten by police during the 1912–1913 Little Falls textile strike in Little Falls, New York

After the Civil War, industrialization and urbanization grew rapidly in the United States. This was accompanied by a rising organized labor movement, in which workers formed unions and joined in organized actions, such as strikes. Between 1880 and 1900, New York City had 5,090 strikes and Chicago had 1,736 strikes. The economic elites of the era typically characterized these strikes as "riots", and they encouraged the police to break the strikes. Consequently, the police broke up strikes through two primary methods: extreme violence and making "public order" arrests at a mass scale. Some state governments authorized privatized police forces to repress strikes, such as the Coal and Iron Police in Pennsylvania. Private detective agencies, such as Pinkerton, often supervised these efforts. Violent confrontations came out of this system, such as the Latimer Massacre (1897), in which 19 unarmed miners were killed, and the Coal Strike of 1902, which involved a pitched battle for five months. Ultimately, state governments decided that it would be easier to police labor with public forces, leading to the establishment of state police forces (such as the Pennsylvania State Police, formed in 1905).

=== Jim Crow South ===
By the late 19th century, local and state governments began to pass Jim Crow laws. These laws enforced strict racial segregation in schools, parks, neighborhoods, restaurants, and other public places. This era saw a rise in lynchings and mob murders of African-Americans, with the police not arresting the perpetrators. It was estimated that "at least one-half of the lynchings are carried out with police officers participating, and that in nine-tenths of the others the officers either condone or wink at the mob action," as reported by Arthur F. Rapper in 1933. Meanwhile, African-Americans suffered police brutality, such as the 1946 beating of Isaac Woodward in Batesburg, South Carolina. Due to the brutality of Jim Crow laws, many African-Americans fled to Northern and Western cities in the Great Migration, where they experienced police brutality, as well.

=== Professionalization of police ===
In the United States, the passage of the Volstead Act (popularly known as the National Prohibition Act) in 1919 had a long-term negative impact on policing practices. During Prohibition (1919–33), the problem of police corruption was only worsened, as crime was growing dramatically in response to the demand for illegal alcohol. Many law enforcement agencies stepped up the use of unlawful practices. Police officers were commonly bribed so that bootlegging and speakeasies could continue, in addition to the flourishing organized crime underworlds of cities such as Chicago, New York City, and Philadelphia. Some police officers became employed by organized crime syndicates, and they helped perform duties, such as harassment and intimidation of rivals.

By the time of the Hoover administration (1929–1933), the issue had risen to national concern and a National Committee on Law Observation and Enforcement (popularly known as the Wickersham Commission) was formed to look into the situation. The resulting "Report on Lawlessness in Law Enforcement" (1931) concluded that "[t]he third degree—that is, the use of physical brutality, or other forms of cruelty, to obtain involuntary confessions or admissions—is widespread." In the years following the report, landmark legal judgments such as Brown v. Mississippi helped cement a legal obligation to respect the due process clause of the Fourteenth Amendment.

The result was the beginning of a new era in law enforcement in the United States, which aimed to professionalize and reform the industry. It was decided that police should function separately from political wards or leaders, and police precincts were altered to no longer overlap with political wards. Police departments became more bureaucratic with a clear chain of command. New practices were put into place to recruit, train, and reward police officers. By the 1950s, police officers began to win collective bargaining rights and form unions, after a long period of not being allowed to form unions (particularly after the Boston police strike in 1919).

However, these changes were not welcomed by all community members. Police departments adopted tactics that often antagonized people, such as aggressive stop and frisk. Police departments also became increasingly insular and "isolated from public life" as a result of these changes, according to crime historian Samuel Walker. For these reasons, among other reasons, they were particularly unequipped to handle the cultural and social upheaval of the 1960s.

=== Civil Rights Movement era ===
The Civil Rights Movement was the target of numerous incidents of police brutality in its struggle for justice and racial equality, notably during the Birmingham campaign of 1963–64 and during the Selma to Montgomery marches of 1965. Media coverage of the brutality sparked national outrage, and public sympathy for the movement grew rapidly as a result. Martin Luther King Jr. criticized police brutality in his speeches. Furthermore, the period was marked by riots in response to police violence against African-Americans and Latinos, including the Harlem riot of 1964, 1964 Philadelphia race riot, Watts riots (1965), Division Street riots (1966), and 1967 Detroit riot. In 1966, the Black Panther Party was formed by Huey P. Newton and Bobby Seale, in order to challenge police brutality against African-Americans from disproportionately white police departments. The conflict between the Black Panther Party and various police departments often resulted in violence with the deaths of 34 members of the Black Panther Party and 15 police officers.

In 1968, the American Indian Movement was organized in Minneapolis, Minnesota, in response to widespread police brutality used against urban Native Americans. Founded by Dennis Banks, Clyde Bellecourt, Vernon Bellecourt, and Russell Means, the movement grew while 75 percent of Native Americans had moved to urban areas, becoming Urban Indians as a result of federal Indian Termination Act and other policies. A.I.M. was later accepted by traditional Elders living at Native American reservations.

The Civil Rights Movement and A.I.M. were also targeted by the FBI in a program called COINTELPRO (1956–79, and beyond). Under this program, the FBI would use undercover agents and police to create violence and chaos within political groups, such as the American Indian Movement, Socialist Worker's Party, the Black Panther Party, and the Organization of Afro-American Unity. The police and undercover agents would harm organizers and assassinate leaders. Black Panther leaders Mark Clark and Fred Hampton, were killed in a 1969 FBI raid at Hampton's apartment in Chicago.

External videos
- 3/7/91: Video of Rodney King Beaten by Police Released

In the United States, race and accusations of police brutality continue to be closely linked, and the phenomenon has sparked a string of race riots over the years. Especially notable among these incidents was the uprising caused by the arrest and beating of Rodney King on March 3, 1991, by officers of the Los Angeles Police Department. The atmosphere was particularly volatile because the brutality had been videotaped by a civilian and widely broadcast afterward. When the four law enforcement officers charged with assault and other violations were acquitted, the 1992 Los Angeles Riots broke out.

=== Anti-war demonstrations ===
During the Vietnam War, anti-war demonstrations were sometimes quelled through the use of billy clubs and tear gas. One notorious assault took place during the August 1968 Democratic National Convention in Chicago. Some rogue police officers took off their badges, in order to escape identification, and brutally assaulted protesters. Journalists were assaulted inside the convention hall. The actions of the police were later described as a "police riot" in the Walker Report to the U.S. National Commission on the Causes and Prevention of Violence. On May 15, 1969, police opened fire on protesters in People's Park in Berkeley, California, which resulted in serious injuries for some protesters. The 1970 Kent State shootings of 13 university students by the National Guard have been described as the culmination of such violent confrontations.

=== War on drugs ===
In June 1971, President Richard M. Nixon declared a war on drugs. This new "war" brought in stricter policing and criminal laws, including no-knock warrants and mandatory sentencing. As was the case with Prohibition, the war on drugs was marked by increased police misconduct. War on drugs policing—notably stop and frisk and Special Weapons and Tactics (SWAT) teams—contributed to police brutality, especially targeting minority communities. Years later, Nixon aide John Ehrlichman, explained: "The Nixon campaign in 1968, and the Nixon White House after that, had two enemies: the antiwar left and black people... We knew we couldn't make it illegal to be either... but by getting the public to associate the hippies with marijuana and blacks with heroin, and then criminalizing both heavily, we could disrupt those communities. We could arrest their leaders, raid their homes, break up their meetings, and vilify them night after night on the evening news." Throughout a series of court cases, the 4th amendment has been interpreted in differing ways. Terry v. Ohio ruled frisks constitutional if the police officer had "reasonable suspicion". As time progressed, frisks have become more similar to arrests. Stop and frisk used to not involve any handcuffs, weapons, or arrest, now they do. The war on drugs has increased the amount of power police officers have.

The war on drugs has been seen as responsible for police misconduct towards African-Americans and Latinos. While white people and African-Americans both use and sell drugs at roughly similar rates, African-Americans are over six times as likely to be incarcerated for drug-related charges, according to 2015 data. Specifically, the use of stop and frisk tactics by police have targeted African-Americans and Latinos. In looking at data from New York in the early 2000s up to 2014, people who had committed no offense made up 82% to 90% of those who were stopped and frisked. Of those people stopped, only 9% to 12% were white. People who were stopped felt that they had experienced psychological violence, and the police sometimes used insults against them. Stop and frisk tactics caused people to experience anxiety about leaving their homes, due to fears of police harassment and abuse.

With the militarization of the police, SWAT teams have been used more frequently in drug possession situations. SWAT teams can be armed with weapons like diversionary grenades. In cases where SWAT teams were used, only 35% of the time were drugs found in peoples' homes. African-Americans and Latinos are disproportionately the targets of these raids, and according to the ACLU, "Sending a heavily armed team of officers to perform 'normal' police work can dangerously escalate situations that need never have involved violence."

=== Torture ===
Police brutality also constitutes the use of torture for investigative or punishment purposes. From 1972 to 1991, Jon Burge and other members of the Chicago Police Department tortured over 120 people, 118 of them being African-American. They used electrical shocks, assault, suffocation tactics, burning, and more methods to coerce false confessions out of their victims. Many of these victims were found innocent in recent years, including four people that were on death row due to the maltreatment. Burge and the other officers were never charged with torture against these victims. In 2015, the Chicago City Council passed the Reparations Ordinance, which provided compensation to survivors of police torture by the CPD.

=== Post 9/11 ===
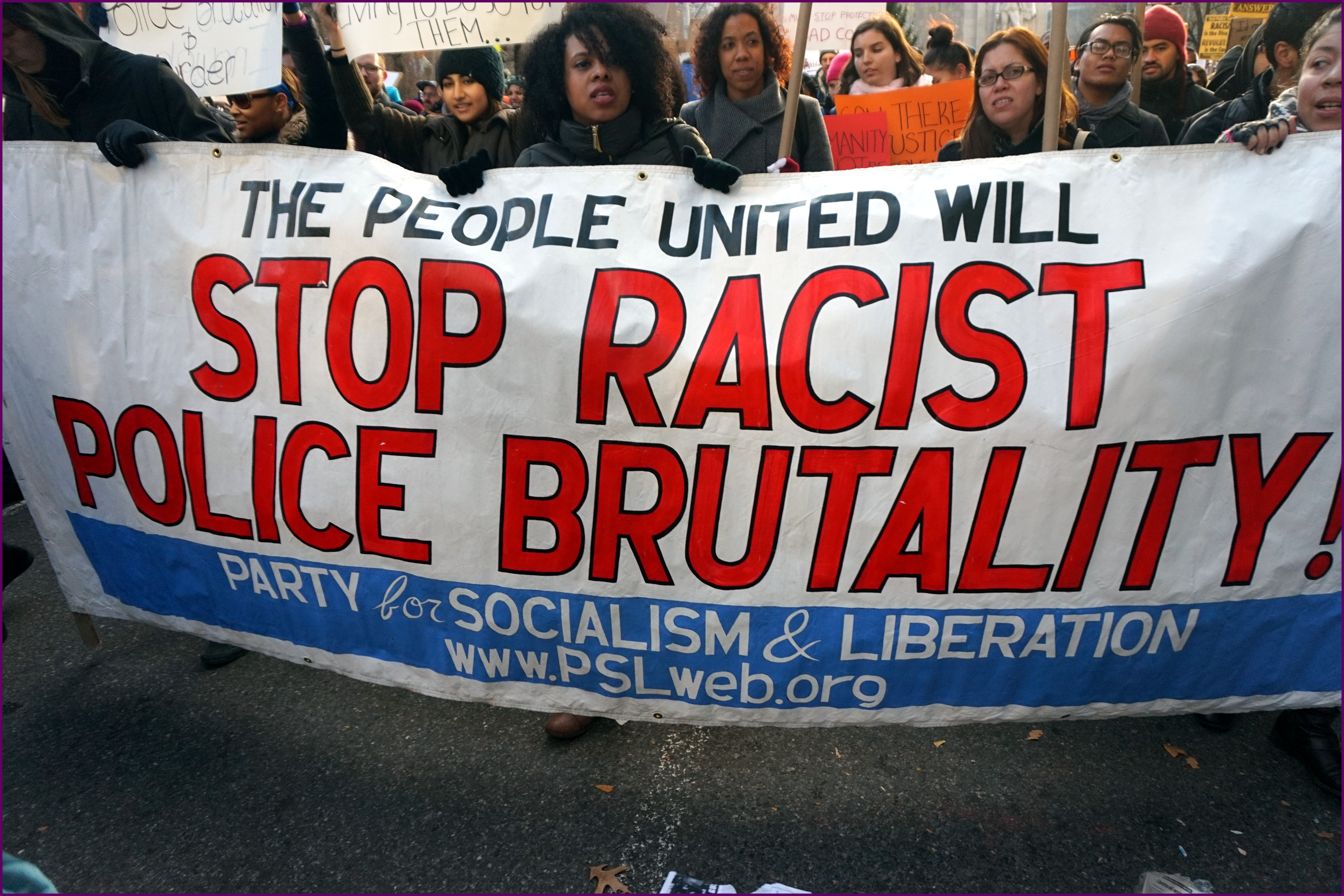
Protest against police brutality in New York City, December 2014

After the attacks of September 11, 2001, human rights observers raised concerns about increased police brutality in the U.S. An extensive report prepared for the United Nations Human Rights Committee, published in 2006, stated that in the U.S. the war on terror "created a generalized climate of impunity for law enforcement officers, and contributed to the erosion of what few accountability mechanisms exist for civilian control over law enforcement agencies. As a result, police brutality and abuse persist unabated and undeterred across the country." The culture of impunity for police is reinforced by law enforcement operations with the FBI's Joint Terrorism Task Force, which undertakes "disruption" actions against suspects instead of investigations and criminal charges. During the "war on terror", there have been noted increases in enforcement power for officers. By 2007, discussion on the appropriateness of using racial profiling and force against people of color has decreased since 9/11. Racial profiling specifically increased for those of South Asian, Arab, Middle Eastern, and Muslim origins. An example of increased use of police use of force has been in the use of tasers. From 2001 to 2007, at least 150 deaths were attributed to tasers and many injuries occurred. People of color have been the main people who have been targeted the most with regards to increased taser use.

=== Recent incidents ===
==== Undercover officers and sex workers ====
A decision by the House and the Senate in Hawaii was expected in May 2014 after police agreed in March 2014 not to oppose the revision of a law that was implemented in the 1970s, allowing undercover police officers to engage in sexual relations with sex workers during the course of investigations. (A similar program in the United Kingdom resulted in physical and emotional abuse of victims, and children born without fathers when the undercover operation ended; see UK undercover policing relationships scandal). Following initial protest from supporters of the legislation, all objections were retracted on March 25, 2014. A Honolulu police spokeswoman informed Time magazine that, at the time of the court's decision, no reports had been made in regard to the abuse of the exemption by police, while a Hawaiian senator stated to journalists: "I suppose that in retrospect the police probably feel somewhat embarrassed about this whole situation." However, the Pacifica Alliance to Stop Slavery and other advocates affirmed their knowledge of police brutality in this area and explained that the fear of retribution is the main deterrent for sex workers who seek to report offending officers. At a Hawaiian Senate Judiciary Committee hearing, also in March 2014, an attorney testified that his client was raped three times by Hawaiian police before prostitution was cited as the reason for her subsequent arrest.

==== Ferguson unrest ====
In August 2014, an unarmed 18-year-old African American named Michael Brown was shot by Darren Wilson, a white police officer in Ferguson, Missouri. The predominately black city erupted after the shooting. Riots following the shooting generated much debate about the treatment of African-Americans by law enforcement.

==== Kisela v. Hughes ====
In May 2010, police responded to a call of a woman, Amy Hughes, erratically hacking a tree with a large kitchen knife. Hughes began advancing on a civilian, later identified to be Hughes' roommate. Officer Kisela decided to fire four shots toward Hughes and she was later treated for non-life-threatening injuries. It was later discovered that Hughes had a history of mental illness. Hughes filed a lawsuit against Officer Kisela, claiming excessive use of force and a violation of her Fourth Amendment right. The Supreme Court ruled in favor of the officer, stating that the officer had probable cause to believe that the suspect posed a serious threat to the public and to other officers. The Court ruled that Officer Kisela is entitled to immunity.

==== Water protectors ====
Water protectors have faced police brutality at the hands of militarized law enforcement. Notable cases include the Dakota Access Pipeline protests in 2016 when the Morton County sheriff's department (supplemented by officers from six states) attacked hundreds of water protectors with concussion grenades, tear gas, rubber bullets, and water cannons in sub-freezing temperatures. They subjected water protectors to strip searches after arrest. Energy Transfer Partners (the pipeline company) also employed a private security firm that used attack dogs and pepper spray against water protectors who were attempting to defend sacred burial sites from being bulldozed. Several water protectors were treated for dog bites. Police observed but did not intervene.

At the Stop Line 3 pipeline protests in Minnesota, militarized police have subjected water protectors to pepper spray and rubber bullets during a series of arrests, and protesters who've been jailed have reported mistreatment from officers such as lack of proper food, solitary confinement, and denial of medications. Over 600 people were arrested between January and August 2021. Enbridge (the pipeline company) enables increased police militarization by funding an escrow account that law enforcement uses to buy equipment and to train and pay officers. Enbridge had paid $2 million to law enforcement agencies through escrow by August 2021.

==== #SayHerName movement ====
The campaign #SayHerName was created in December 2014 by Kimberlé Crenshaw. This movement was brought about to raise awareness for the victims of police brutality that were black women. The #SayHerName movement is a social movement inside the Black Lives Matter movement. As Crenshaw told NPR, "Say Her Name is trying to raise awareness by insisting that we say their names because if we can say their names we can know more about their stories."

The name of Breonna Taylor was part of the Say Her Name movement. Taylor was killed by police in Louisville, Kentucky in March 2020. Police officers forced entry into her apartment, and Taylor was shot six times after her boyfriend Kenneth Walker shot officer Jonathan Mattingly. Breonna Taylor's death lead to worldwide protests and outrage.

==== George Floyd protests ====
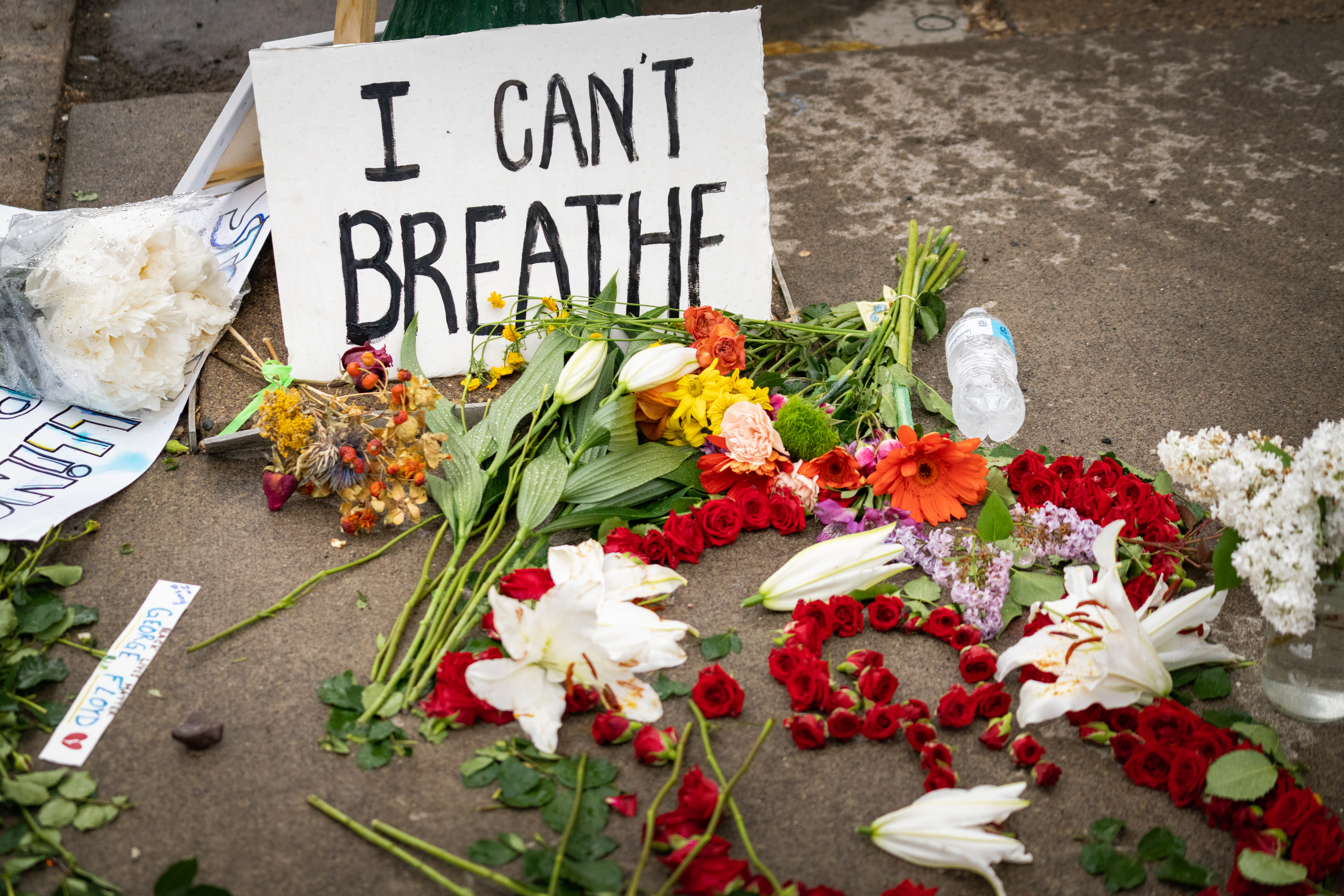
A memorial for George Floyd, who was murdered by a police officer

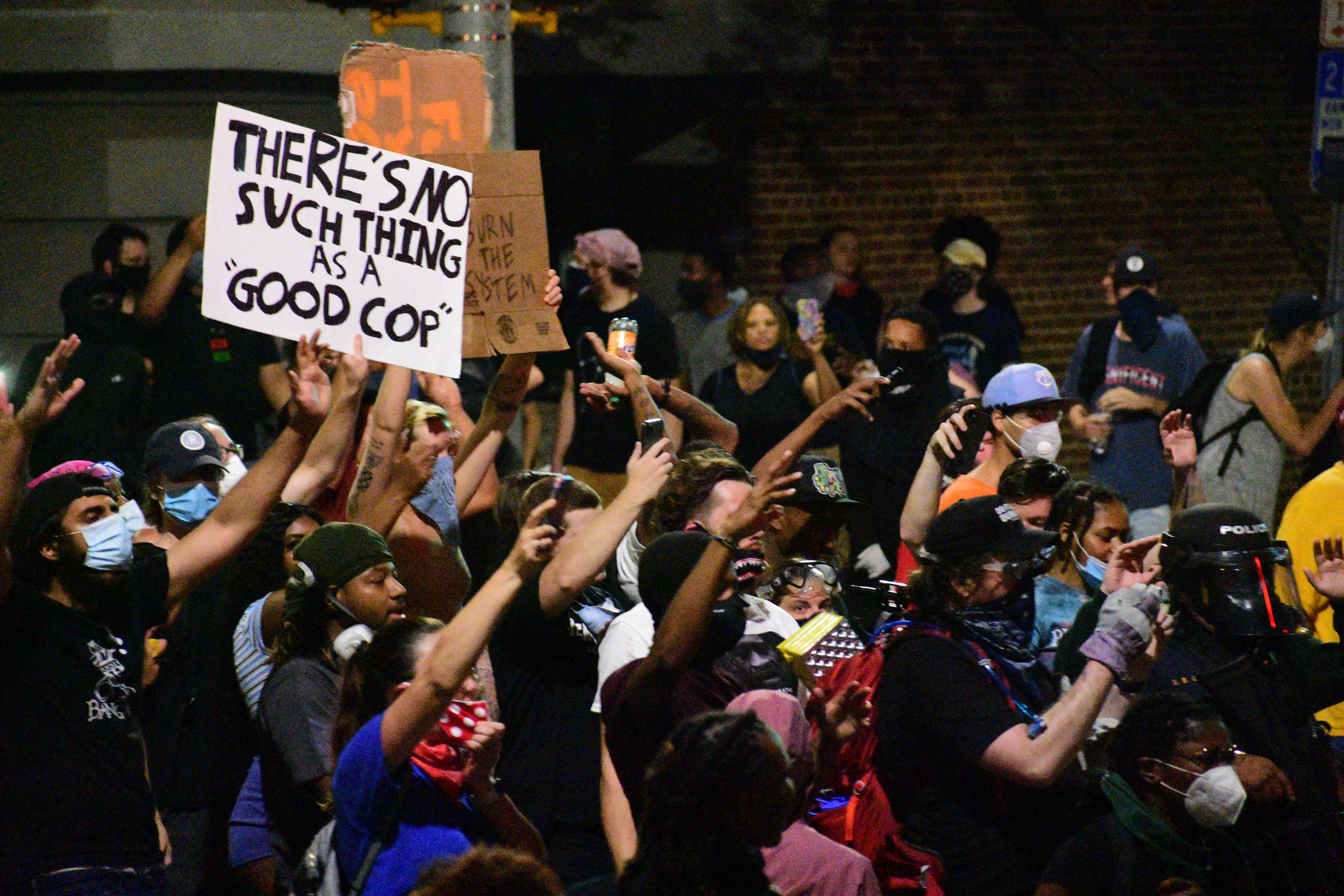
George Floyd protests in Raleigh, North Carolina on May 30, 2020

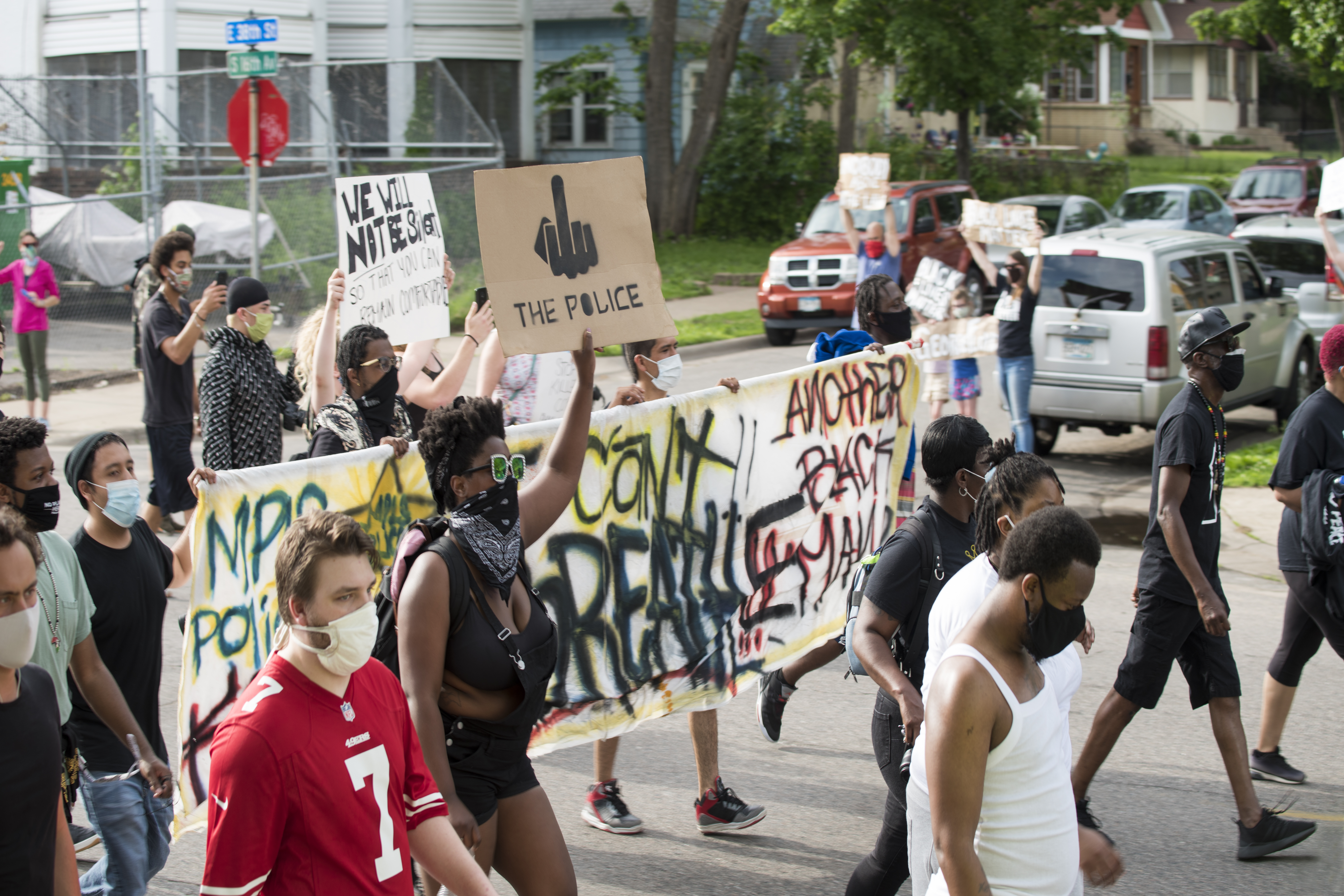
Protesters in Minneapolis on 26 May 2020, the day after the murder of George Floyd

In May 2020, the issue of police brutality saw a surge in public response following the murder of George Floyd in Minneapolis. Related protests occurred nationwide and internationally beginning in Minneapolis, Minnesota on May 26, 2020. These protests were attended by thousands of people across the United States and had a worldwide impact on the outlook of police brutality.

==== Kenosha unrest ====
On 23 August 2020, a Black man in Kenosha, identified as Jacob Blake, was shot by police multiple times in the back. He was shot in front of his three young sons and suffered critical injuries. Later, he was reported by Civil Rights attorney Ben Crump to be in stable condition but remained in an intensive care unit. The shooting came as demonstrators continued to decry police violence in the American cities. It was later determined that Kenosha police officers were responding to a domestic violence call concerning Blake made by his girlfriend, and at the time of the shooting, "Blake was armed with a knife and had resisted arrest despite multiple Taser shots" and commands by police to drop the weapon. In a report published on January 5, 2021, Kenosha County District Attorney Michael Graveley declined to issue criminal charges against the three officers involved in the shooting, concluding that their "use of force… was justified, in keeping with Wisconsin Law, in keeping with the Kenosha Police Department's use of force training and policy, and widely accepted law enforcement use of force standards."

==== Operation Metro Surge ====
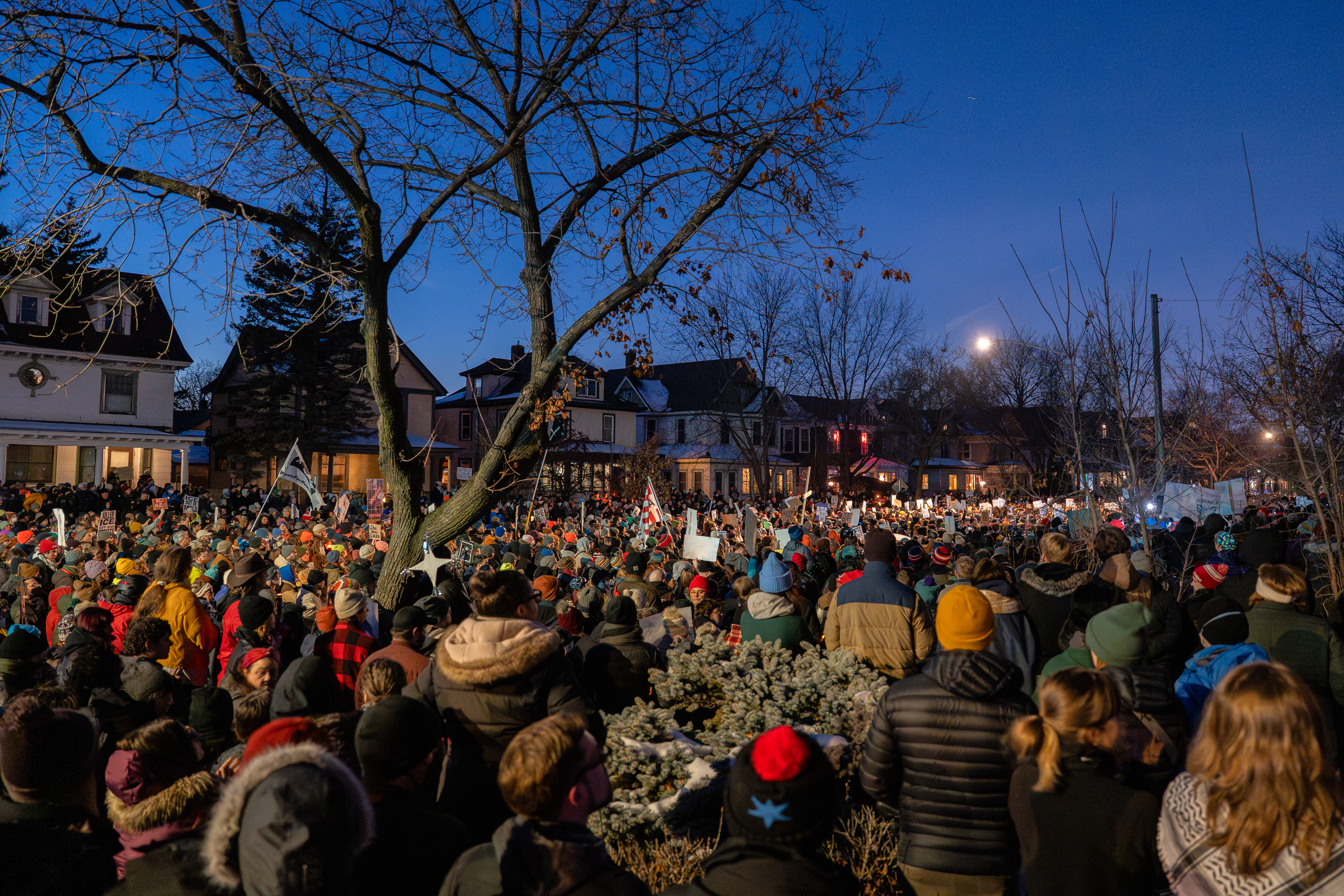
Vigil in Minneapolis for Renée Good

In December 2025, the United States Immigration and Customs Enforcement (ICE) and Customs and Border Protection (CBP) began Operation Metro Surge to apprehend and deport undocumented immigrants.

On January 7, 2026, Renée Good, a 37-year-old American citizen, was shot and killed by an ICE agent named Jonathan Ross in Minneapolis. Good was in her car, parked sideways on the street. Ross walked around the car, then went back and around it again. Other agents came up and one told her to get out of the car while reaching through her open window. Good briefly drove in reverse, then started moving forward and to the right into traffic. At that moment, Ross was standing at the front-left side of the car and fired three shots, killing her as her car passed him and turned away from him. The incident led to widespread protests across the country and several investigations.

On January 24, 2026, Alex Pretti a 37-year-old American intensive care nurse was shot killed by two CBP officers in Minneapolis. Pretti was filming CBP agents outside a restaurant with his phone, when he was pepper sprayed, wrestled to the ground and shot at least ten times, continuing after he lay motionless.

The killings of Grace and Pretti resulted in widespread protests across the country.

== Statistics ==
An extensive U.S. Department of Justice report on police use of force released in 2001 indicated that in 1999, "approximately 422,000 people 16 years old and older were estimated to have had contact with police in which force or the threat of force was used."

However, the prevalence of police brutality is not comprehensively documented, and the statistics on police brutality are much less available. The few statistics that exist include a 2006 Department of Justice report, which showed that out of 26,556 citizen complaints made in 2002 about excessive use of police force among large U.S. agencies (representing 5% of agencies and 59% of officers), about 2,000 were found to have merit.

Other studies have shown that most police brutality goes unreported. In 1982, the federal government funded a "Police Services Study", in which over 12,000 randomly selected civilians were interviewed in three metropolitan areas. The study found that 13.6 percent of those surveyed claimed to have had cause to complain about police service (including verbal abuse, discourtesy and physical abuse) in the previous year. Yet only 30 percent of those filed formal complaints. A 1998 Human Rights Watch report stated that in all 14 precincts it examined, the process of filing a complaint was "unnecessarily difficult and often intimidating."

Research shows that measures of the presence of black and Hispanic people and majority/minority income inequality are related positively to average annual civil rights criminal complaints.

== Investigation ==
In the United States, investigation of cases of police brutality has often been left to internal police commissions and/or district attorneys (DAs). Internal police commissions have often been criticized for a lack of accountability and for bias favoring officers, as they frequently declare upon review that the officer(s) acted within the department's rules, or according to their training. For instance, an April 2007 study of the Chicago Police Department found that out of more than 10,000 police abuse complaints filed between 2002 and 2003, only 19 (0.19%) resulted in meaningful disciplinary action. The study charges that the police department's oversight body allows officers with "criminal tendencies to operate with impunity," and argues that the Chicago Police Department should not be allowed to police itself.

Investigations can be conducted by civilian complaint review board (CCRB), which act as an independent agency that can investigate, conduct hearings, and make recommendations in response to complaints of police brutality. However, only 19% of large municipal police forces have a CCRB, such as the Civilian Complaint Review Board (New York City), Civilian Office of Police Accountability (Chicago), Citizen Police Review Board (Pittsburgh), and Police Review Commission (Berkeley). Law enforcement jurisdictions that have a CCRB have an excessive force complaint rate against their officers of 11.9% verses 6.6% complaint rate for those without a CCRB. Of those forces without a CCRB, only 8% of the complaints were sustained. Thus, for the year 2002, the rate at which police brutality complaints were sustained was 0.53% for the larger police municipalities nationwide.

The ability of district attorneys to investigate police brutality has also been called into question, as DAs depend on help from police departments to bring cases to trial. It was only in the 1990s that serious efforts began to transcend the difficulties of dealing with systemic patterns of police misconduct.

Logo on T-shirts sold at Daytona Beach Police Department headquarters in Florida, cited in a lawsuit against the DBPD alleging police brutality, is said to show the DBPD condones violence.

Beyond police departments and DAs, mechanisms of government oversight have gradually evolved. The Rodney King case triggered the creation of the Independent Commission on the Los Angeles Police Department, informally known as the Christopher Commission, in 1991. The commission, mandated to investigate the practices of the LAPD, uncovered disturbing patterns of misconduct and abuse, but the reforms it recommended were put on hold. Meanwhile, media reports revealed a frustration in dealing with systemic abuse in other jurisdictions as well, such as New York and Pittsburgh. Selwyn Raab of The New York Times wrote about how the "Blue Code of Silence among police officers helped to conceal even the most outrageous examples of misconduct."

Within this climate, the police misconduct provision of the Violent Crime Control and Law Enforcement Act of 1994 was created, which authorized the Attorney General to "file lawsuits seeking court orders to reform police departments engaging in a pattern or practice of violating citizens' federal rights." As of January 31, 2003, the Department of Justice had used this provision to negotiate reforms in twelve jurisdictions across the U.S. (Pittsburgh Bureau of Police, Steubenville Police Department, New Jersey State Police, Los Angeles Police Department, District of Columbia Metropolitan Police Department, Highland Park, Illinois Police Department, Cincinnati Police Department, Columbus Police Department, Buffalo Police Department, Mount Prospect, Illinois Police Department, Seattle Police Department, and the Montgomery County, Maryland Police Department).

Data obtained by the Associated Press in 2016 showed a racial disparity in officers' use of stun guns.

On 15 May 2020, Amnesty International suggested that American authorities should avoid repressive measures that unduly restrict human rights in the name of "protecting" people from COVID-19. The videos verified by researchers and Amnesty's Crisis Evidence Lab claimed the use of detention as a first resort; excessive and unnecessary use of force in the enforcement of COVID-19 lockdowns; and the imposition of mandatory quarantines in inhumane conditions.

On 22 June 2020, the University of Chicago reported that the police departments in the 20 largest American cities were failing to meet even the most basic international human rights standards governing the use of lethal force. The study revealed that America's biggest police forces lack legality, as they are not answerable to human rights compliant laws authorizing the use of lethal force.

== Causes ==
Numerous doctrines, such as federalism, separation of powers, causation, deference, discretion, and burden of proof have been cited as partial explanations for the judiciaries' fragmented pursuit of police misconduct. However, there is also evidence that courts cannot or choose not to see systemic patterns in police brutality. Other factors that have been cited as encouraging police brutality include institutionalized systems of police training, management, and culture; a criminal-justice system that discourages prosecutors from pursuing police misconduct vigorously; a political system that responds more readily to police than to the residents of inner-city and minority communities; and a political culture that fears crime and values tough policing more than it values due process for all its citizens. Around 1998, it was believed that without substantial social change, the control of police deviance was improbable at best.

=== Legal protections ===
Police officers often still hold significant advantages in legal proceedings and in courts. Records of officer performance and misconduct are sometimes hidden from public view through laws, such as 50-a in New York (repealed in 2020). The law of qualified immunity often shields police officers from prosecution, since it only permits lawsuits against government officials when they have violated a "clearly established" constitutional or statutory right. When cases of police are investigated for crimes, the collection of evidence is typically conducted by police officers, including witness statements, and police may have been the only witnesses. Prosecutors tend to have a close working relationship with police officers, which creates another conflict of interest, and they are often reluctant to aggressively pursue cases against law enforcement. Furthermore, courts tend to sympathize with police officers over civilians, who are often viewed as the "good party" in the case. In 2015, The Washington Post reported that 54 officers had been charged with fatally shooting someone while on duty over the preceding decade. In the 35 cases that had been resolved, a total of 21 officers were acquitted or their charges were dropped.

=== Police unions ===
There is a direction on or around correlation between rates of police union membership and number of people killed by police. Collective bargaining rights introduced by police unions from the 1950s onward (which are negotiated largely in secret) led to a substantial increase of police killings and other abuses especially towards people from racial minorities. Unions have negotiated labor contracts that stop law enforcement agencies firing officers after egregious acts of misconduct. A University of Oxford study of the 100 largest US cities found that increased protections for officers directly correlated with increased levels of violence and other abuses against citizens by police officers. A study by the University of Chicago found that after deputies gained collective bargaining rights in Florida sheriff's offices incidents of violent misconduct increased by around 40%. Researchers at the University of Victoria also found a 40% increase of killing when collective bargaining rights we enacted, with the overwhelming majority of people being killed being non white, the authors of the study described unions as "protection of the right to discriminate". A systemic pattern of "serious violations of the U.S. Constitution and federal law," was found by a Justice Department investigation of Baltimore's police department. A Minneapolis councilperson described the Minneapolis Police Union as a "protection racket".

=== Blue wall of silence ===
Police departments in the United States typically follow an unofficial cultural code, known as the "blue wall of silence". This can also be referred to as the "curtain of silence", "cocoon of silence", "blue code", or "blue shield". According to this rule, police officers do not report misconduct or abuse committed by other officers, and they will not step in when their colleagues are engaging in illegal or abusive behavior. This is because police officers typically consider themselves as part of a larger "brotherhood" or family among other officers. However, when neglected, officers are influenced to further speak out against the police officer that made the offense. On the other hand, if an officer does decide to speak out against another police officer, that same police officer may be subjected to harassment and in some cases, be ostracized. The Blue Wall of Silence is ultimately held together by fear of exile, and when the police force is often treated as a "brotherhood", speaking against "brothers" gives a perceived reality of betrayal and infidelity. This perception often steers officers away from breaking The Wall, leading into a spiral that ends in the wall remaining amidst.

=== Racial profiling ===
Police brutality can be associated with racial profiling. Differences in race, religion, politics, ability, or socioeconomic status often exist between police and the citizenry.

In 2016, about 27% of sworn in police officers were people of color. The leadership of police department and police unions tend to be primarily white, as well. Meanwhile, police officers often work in non-white communities. Some police officers may view the population (or a particular subset thereof) as generally deserving of punishment.

Portions of the population may perceive the police to be oppressors. In addition, there is a perception that victims of police brutality often belong to relatively powerless groups, such as racial or cultural minorities, the disabled, and the poor.

According to a 2015 and 2016 project by The Guardian, more white people are killed by police in raw numbers than black people are, but after adjusting this finding based on the fact that the black population is smaller than the white population, twice as many black people are killed by police per capita than white people are. A 2019 study showed that people of color face a higher likelihood of being killed by police than white men and women do, that risk peaks in young adulthood, and men of color face a nontrivial lifetime risk of being killed by police. A 2015 study shows that racial biases in police departments are likely to occur in major metropolitan counties with greater levels of financial disparity, a higher percentage of Black population, and low median incomes.

Beginning in the 1960s, police departments began to offer cultural sensitivity and diversity trainings. However, these trainings are generally found to be ineffective and removed from the everyday reality of policing.

Since the 1970s, police departments have increasingly hired more non-white officers, following a court order to diversify police departments. The percentage of non-white officers doubled (14% to 27%) between 1987 and 2016. However, according to studies, there is no evidence that non-white officers are less aggressive to non-white civilians. Furthermore, there is no correlation between non-white officers and lower rates of police brutality or community satisfaction with policing. For example, police forces in New York and Philadelphia have comparatively diverse police forces, but they have been criticized for their aggressive tactics and racial profiling. This is explained by the fact that police department priorities are set by politicians and the larger systematic issues of police culture and racism are still prevalent.

=== Militarization of police ===
Police brutality is often linked to the "warrior mentality" and militarization of police departments. Under this system, new recruits enter police academies, where they may be instructed in a manner similar to paramilitary training or what is called a "warrior training". Some police academies even employ independent training companies, such as Close Quarters Battle, which has trained the United States Marine Corps, Navy Seals, and the special forces of other countries. These trainings focus on fear and defensive tactics, rather than community interaction and outreach. The recruits will focus on learning how to kill and aggressively manage crisis situations, as well as engaging in drill formations and standing at attention. Recruits will learn that any situation, including seemingly routine ones (such as traffic stops) can turn deadly, and they receive minimal training in how to manage complex social situations. As noted by Rosa Brooks, "Many police recruits enter the academy as idealists, but this kind of training turns them into cynics."

Once they are trained and working, police often think of crime as a war, in which they are "warriors", and some people are their enemies. The police are provided with military equipment, such as tanks, and some work in militarized units, such as Special Weapons and Tactics (SWAT) teams. Their equipment partially comes from the Department of Defense, due to the 1033 program. Established in 1990 by President George H. W. Bush, the program allows the DoD to give law enforcement their excess equipment (local authorities only pay for shipping costs), with an estimated $7.4 billion of property transferred since the program began. Furthermore, an estimated 19% of police officers are military veterans, documenting a "revolving door" between the military and the police, a phenomenon also found among FBI agents. Internal police records—provided by the Boston and Miami departments—"indicate that officers with military experience generate more civilian complaints of excessive force."

=== Broken windows theory ===
Since the 1980s, police departments have adopted the broken windows theory, as advocated by criminologists like George L. Kelling and James Q. Wilson. This theory posits that signs of disorder or decay in neighborhoods (such as broken windows, graffiti, loitering, drug use, prostitution, etc.) create an impression that the area is neglected, thereby leading to further chaos and crime. Therefore, if police departments directly respond to smaller neighborhood issues, they can help prevent larger issues. By the 1990s, police departments had increasingly adopted this philosophy, and they adopted policing methods inspired by it, such as stop-and-frisk in New York City (adopted in 2001). Police departments were empowered to intervene in civilian life and act as moral authorities. Meanwhile, the problems associated with poor living standards were blamed on civilians, rather than political or economic forces. Consequently, police were given the ability to increase arrests, aggressive policing, and harassment of civilians, which further contributed to police brutality and racial profiling.

=== Threat hypothesis ===
Academic theories such as the threat hypothesis and the community violence hypothesis have been used to explain police brutality. The threat hypothesis implies that "police use force in direct response to a perceived threat from racial and/or economic groups viewed as threatening to the existing social order." According to the community violence hypothesis, "police use force in direct response to levels of violence in the community." This theory explains that force is used to control groups that threaten the community or police themselves with violence. This theory is applied mostly to shield non minorities from competition, fear, and perceived inconveniences. This is usually exercised on a minority, usually of African descent, without evidence or reasonable doubt. The strain minorities feel, weaken their mental health and discourages them. This ultimately caters to a white community as they no longer must worry about an African potentially winning over their economic position. Additionally, Threat Hypothesis also enables a "safer" environment for whites, as whites generally don't feel safe when around people of color. Usually, when around people of color, whites tend to police them. This makes the environment unsafe for nonwhites.

This style of policing is a less grotesque way of wrongly punishing people of color, the far more intense example would be the act of lynching, which would display a person of color be murdered and tortured in front of an audience.

=== Police dogs ===
A 2020 investigation coordinated by the Marshall Project found evidence of widespread deployment of police dogs in the U.S. as disproportionate force and disproportionately against people of color. A series of 13 linked reports, found more than 150 cases from 2015 to 2020 of K-9 officers improperly using dogs as weapons to catch, bite and injure people. The rate of police K-9 bites in Baton Rouge, Louisiana, a majority-Black city of 220,000 residents, averages more than double that of the next-ranked city, Indianapolis, and nearly one-third of the police dog bites are inflicted on teenage men, most of whom are Black. Medical researchers found that police dog attacks are "more like shark attacks than nips from a family pet" due to the aggressive training police dogs undergo. Many people bitten were not violent and were not suspected of crimes. Police officers are often shielded from liability, and federal civil rights laws don't typically cover bystanders who are bitten by mistake. Even when victims can bring cases, lawyers say they struggle because jurors tend to love police dogs.

== Solutions ==
=== Body cameras ===
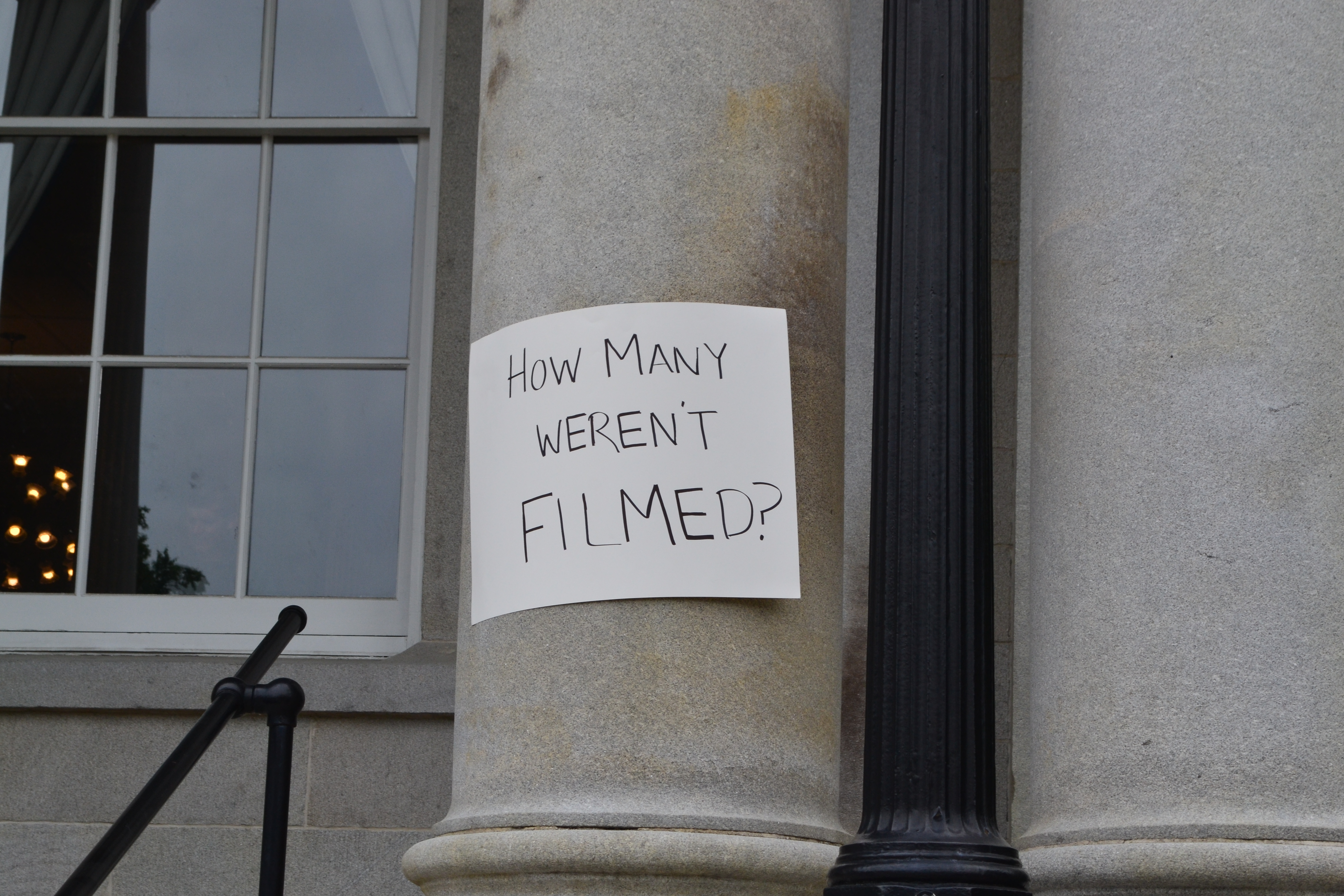
Protest sign at a 2020 Black Lives Matter rally in Concord, New Hampshire

Many policies have been offered for how to prevent police brutality. One proposed solution is body worn cameras. The theory of using body cameras is that police officers will be less likely to commit misconduct if they understand that their actions are being recorded. The United States Department of Justice under Obama's administration supplied $20 million for body cameras to be implemented in police departments. During a case study attempting to test the effects that body cameras had on police actions, researchers found evidence that suggested that police used less force with civilians when they had body cameras.

Police are supposed to have the cameras on from the time they receive a call of an incident to when the entire encounter is over. However, there is controversy regarding police using the equipment properly. The issue regarding an officer's ability to turn on and off the record button is if the police officer is trustworthy. In 2017, Baltimore Police Officer Richard A. Pinheiro Jr. was caught planting evidence. The officer did not realize 30 seconds of footage was available even before switching the camera on. To solve this problem, it has been proposed to record police officers' entire shift and not allowing access for police officers to turn on and off the record button. This can cause technical and cost issues due to the large amount of data the camera would accumulate, for which various solutions have been proposed.

Another possible issue that can occur is the public's inability to access the body camera footage.

According to a survey done by Vocativ in 2014, "41 cities use body cams on some of their officers, 25 have plans to implement body cams and 30 cities do not use or plan to use cams at this time." There are other issues that can occur from the use of body cameras as well. This includes downloading and maintenance of the data which can be expensive. There is also some worry that if video testimony becomes more relied upon in court cases, not having video evidence from body cameras would decrease the likelihood that the court system believes credible testimony from police officers and witnesses

=== Civilian review boards ===
Civilian review boards have been proposed as another solution to decreasing police brutality. Benefits of civilian review boards can include making sure police are doing their jobs and increasing the relationship the police have with the public. Civilian review boards have gotten criticism though. They can be staffed with police who can weaken the effectiveness of the boards. Some boards do not have the authority to order investigations into police departments. They can also lack the funding to be an effective tool. The origins of the Civilian Review Boards date back as far as 1950, when "18 organizations formed the "Permanent Coordination Committee on Police and Minority Groups" to lobby the city to deal with police misconduct in general." Due to the political climate of the time, the Civilians Boards were used as a false solution to help the public feel as if they were heard. Unbeknownst to the public, the Civilian Review Boards would ultimately house Officers among its staff, decreasing the effectiveness.

=== Lawsuits and qualified immunity ===
Excessive use of force is a tort, and police officers may be held liable for damages should they take unconstitutional actions. The ability to sue in federal court was first introduced as a remedy for police brutality and misconduct in 1871 during the Reconstruction era as the Third Enforcement Act. The act allowed plaintiffs to sue directly in federal courts which were important as it allowed plaintiffs to bypass state courts during the Jim Crow era. The theory behind this solution to police brutality is that by taking the civil action to a federal court level, the case will be heard fairly and the financial judgments are intended to have a deterrent effect on future police misconduct in that department.

Since 1967, this remedy has been restricted by Supreme Court precedents through qualified immunity which grants police officers immunity from lawsuits unless their actions violated "clearly established" law. In practice, most jurisdictions rely on court precedent to define clearly established law, so to be successful plaintiffs often must show that a previous court case found the particular act at hand unlawful. For example, the Sixth Circuit Court of Appeals granted immunity to an officer who shot a 14-year-old who dropped a BB gun as he raised his hands, because unlike a 2011 case where an officer was held liable for shooting a man who lowered a shotgun, the boy had pulled the BB gun from his waistband. This is often a stringent requirement, and in a majority of cases since 2005, police officer have been granted immunity for their actions. Lawsuits are sometimes successful, however. For example, in a 2001 settlement, New York City was required to pay a plaintiff $7.125 million in damages and the Patrolmen's Benevolent Association was required to pay $1.625 million. At that time, it was the most money the city had ever paid to settle a police brutality lawsuit and is considered the first time that a police union has paid a claim to settle a brutality suit.

=== Redirecting funds to other departments (defund the police) ===
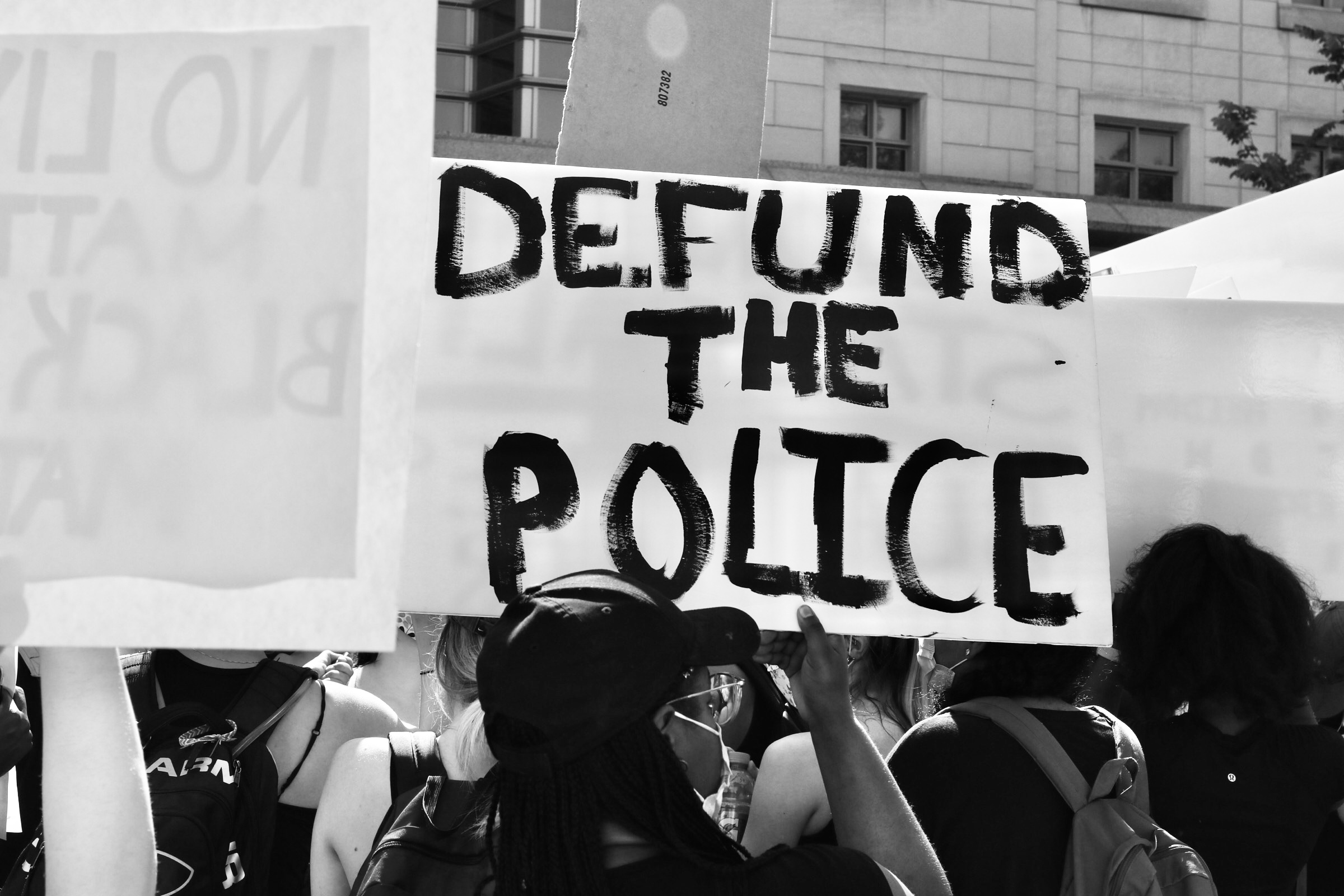
Marchers holding "Defund The Police" during George Floyd protests, June 5, 2020

After the murder of George Floyd, there have been widespread calls to defund the police. The idea behind this is that money is diverted from policing to the areas needed to prevent crime, for example, housing, employment, welfare, etc. There have been calls for this since society has seen a lack of reform in policing around police brutality and discrimination.

=== Police abolition ===
The police abolition movement is a political movement that advocates replacing policing with other systems of public safety. Police abolitionists believe that policing, as a system, is inherently flawed and cannot be reformed—a view that rejects the ideology of police reformists. While reformists seek to address the ways in which policing occurs, abolitionists seek to transform policing altogether through a process of disbanding, disempowering, and disarming the police. Abolitionists argue that the institution of policing is deeply rooted in a history of white supremacy and settler colonialism and that it is inseparable from a pre-existing racial capitalist order, and thus believe a reformist approach to policing will always fail.

Police abolition is a process that requires communities to create alternatives to policing. This process involves the deconstruction of the preconceived understandings of policing and resisting co-option by reformists. It also involves engaging in and supporting practices that reduce police power and legitimacy, such as defunding the police.

=== New York anti-restraint law ===
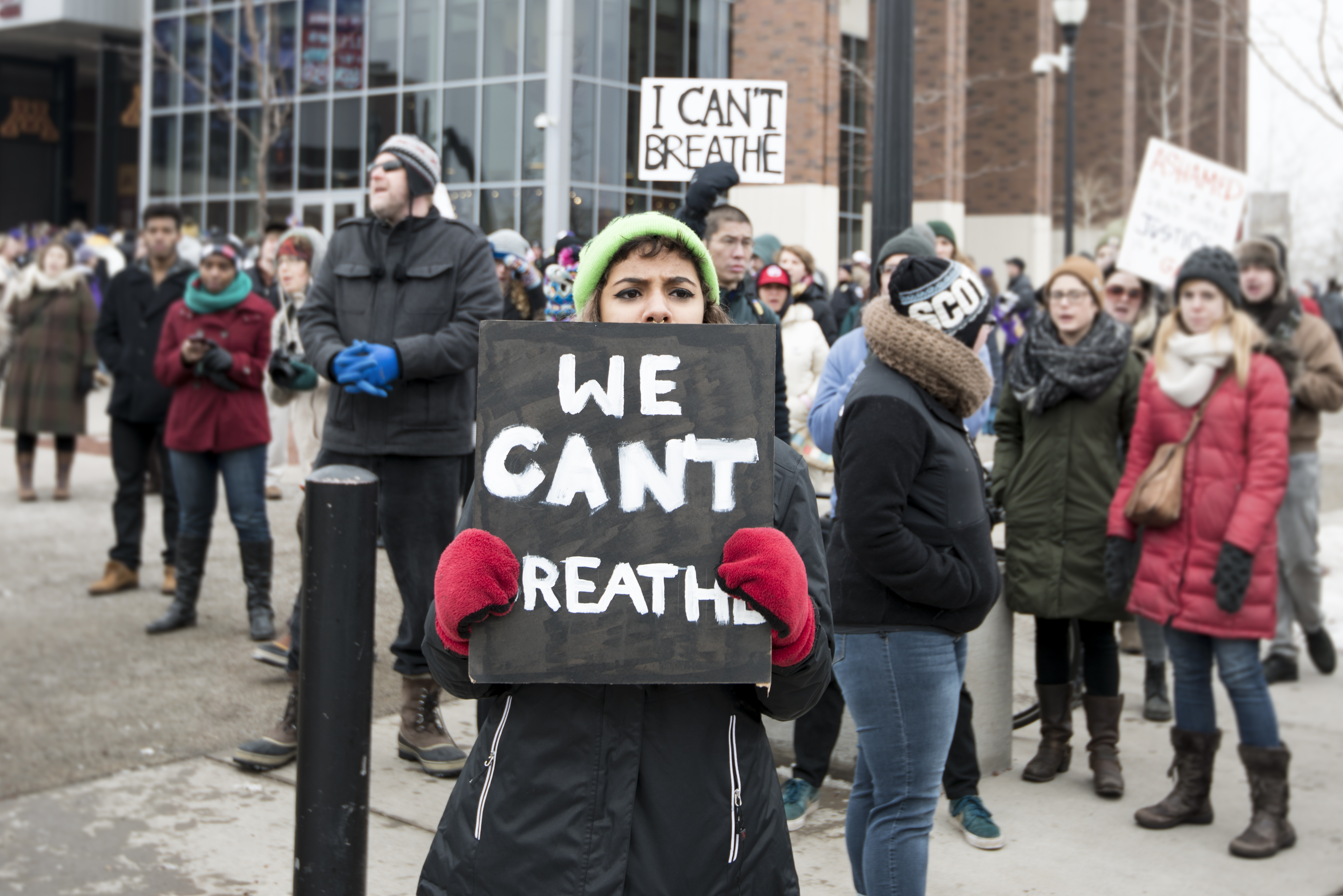
Protesters holding "We Can't Breathe" during Eric Garner protests, December 7, 2014

On June 8, 2020, both houses of the New York state assembly passed the Eric Garner Anti-Chokehold Act, which makes it so any police officer in the state of New York who injures or kills somebody through the use of "a chokehold or similar restraint" can be charged with a Class C felony, punishable by up to 15 years in prison. New York Governor Andrew Cuomo signed the "long overdue" police reforms into law on June 12, 2020.

== Effects ==
Police brutality is the unlawful use of excessive or otherwise unwarranted force against individuals or groups of people. Some definitions also include verbal harassment, intimidation, and other non-physical actions that may cause harm. The World Health Organization names police brutality as a form of violence, and defines violence as "the intentional use of physical force or power, threatened or actual, against oneself, another person, or against a group or community that either results in or has a high likelihood of resulting in injury, death, psychological harm, maldevelopment or deprivation."

Data from 2021, published by Mapping Police Violence, shows that the excessive force imposed by police officers had increased in the decade prior to its publication and caused social misinterpretations of the role that police officers play in the community. Political scientist Marie Gottschalk writes in 2025 that homicides by police officers have been increasing in rural and suburban areas, meaning that, while black Americans in urban communities are more than twice as likely than white Americans to be killed by police, the latter are subjected to police violence to a much greater extent than their counterparts in Canada and Western Europe. She posits that police use of excessive force is a major barometer - second only to mass incarceration - of state and structural violence and control in a society.

According to Gallup, Inc., in 2015, the percentage of people who have "a great deal" or "quite a lot" of confidence in the police hit its lowest since 1993 at 52 percent. Of this 52 percent, Democrats saw the biggest drop in confidence. Democrats' confidence in police dropped to 42% from 2017 to 2018 compared with 2012–2013, a larger change than for any other subgroup. Over the same period, Independents' (51%) and Republicans' (69%) confidence in the police has not changed. By mid-2020, Gallup reported that the overall trust in police had fallen further, with only 48% of Americans asserting "a great deal" or "quite a lot" of confidence in the police. However, faith in the police from Republicans had risen to 82% in the same poll.

=== Firearms usage ===
The Supreme Court Decision of Tennessee v. Garner made it possible to shoot a fleeing suspect only if they may cause harm to innocent people to prevent officers from shooting every suspect that tries to escape.

=== Stereotypes ===
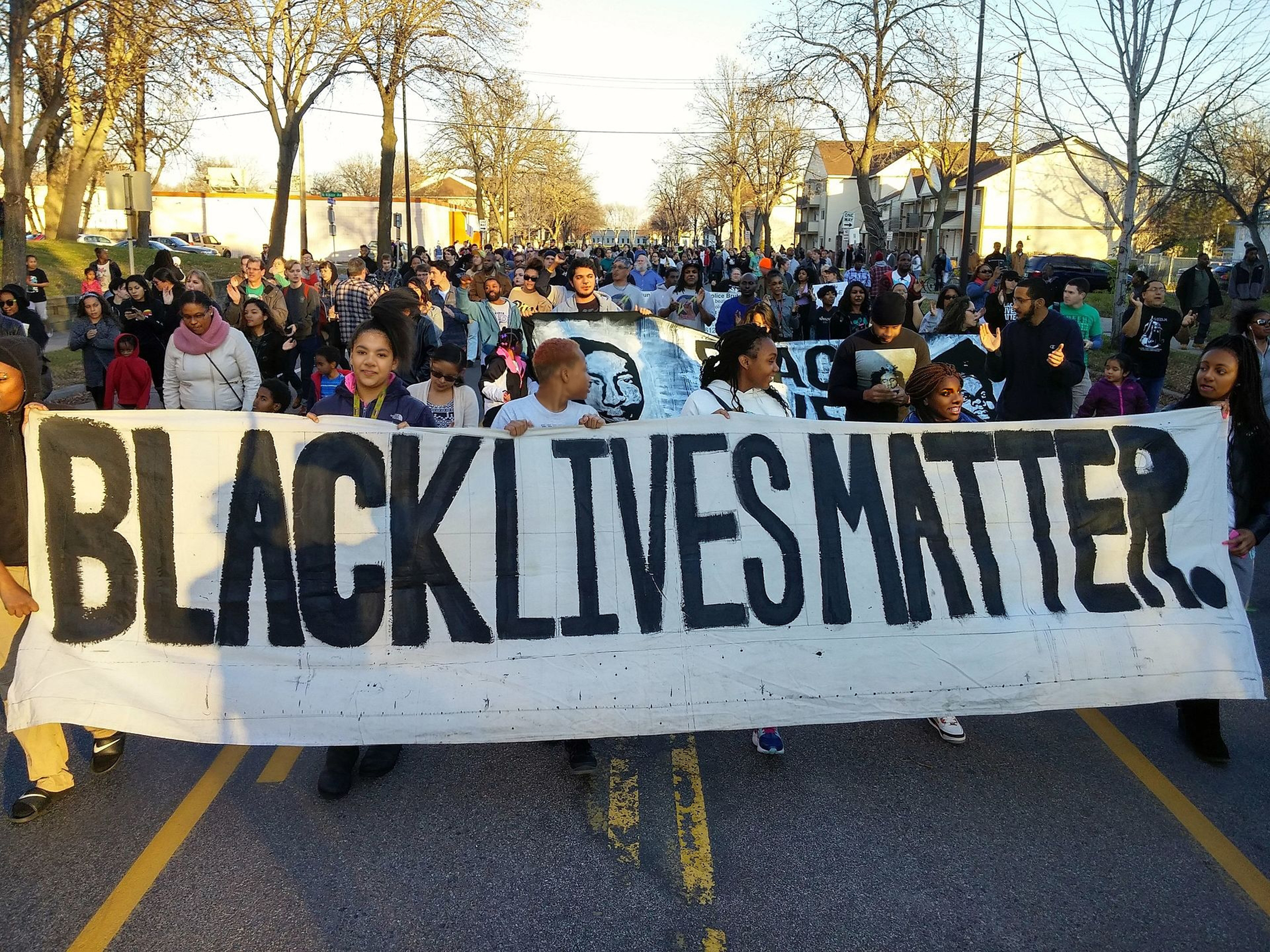
Protest march in response to the Jamar Clark shooting, Minneapolis, Minnesota

Lorie Fridell, Associate Professor of Criminology at University of South Florida, states that "racial profiling was the number one issue facing police [in the 1990s]", which led her to two conclusions: "bias in policing was not just a few officers in a few departments and, overwhelmingly, the police in this country are well-intentioned." According to a Department of Justice report, "Officers, like the rest of us, have an implicit bias linking blacks to crime. So the black crime implicit bias might be implicated in some of the use of deadly force against African-Americans in our country".

A 2014 experiment conducted on white undergraduate female students showed that there was a higher degree of fear of racial minorities. The paper concluded that people with a higher fear of racial minorities and dehumanization had "a lower threshold for shooting Black relative to White and East Asian targets".

While the Justice Department reported that Cleveland police officers used "excessive deadly force, including shootings and head strikes with impact weapons; unnecessary, excessive, and retaliatory force, including Tasers, chemical sprays, and their fists" on the victim, there was no real repercussions from their actions.

=== Black Americans and the US police ===
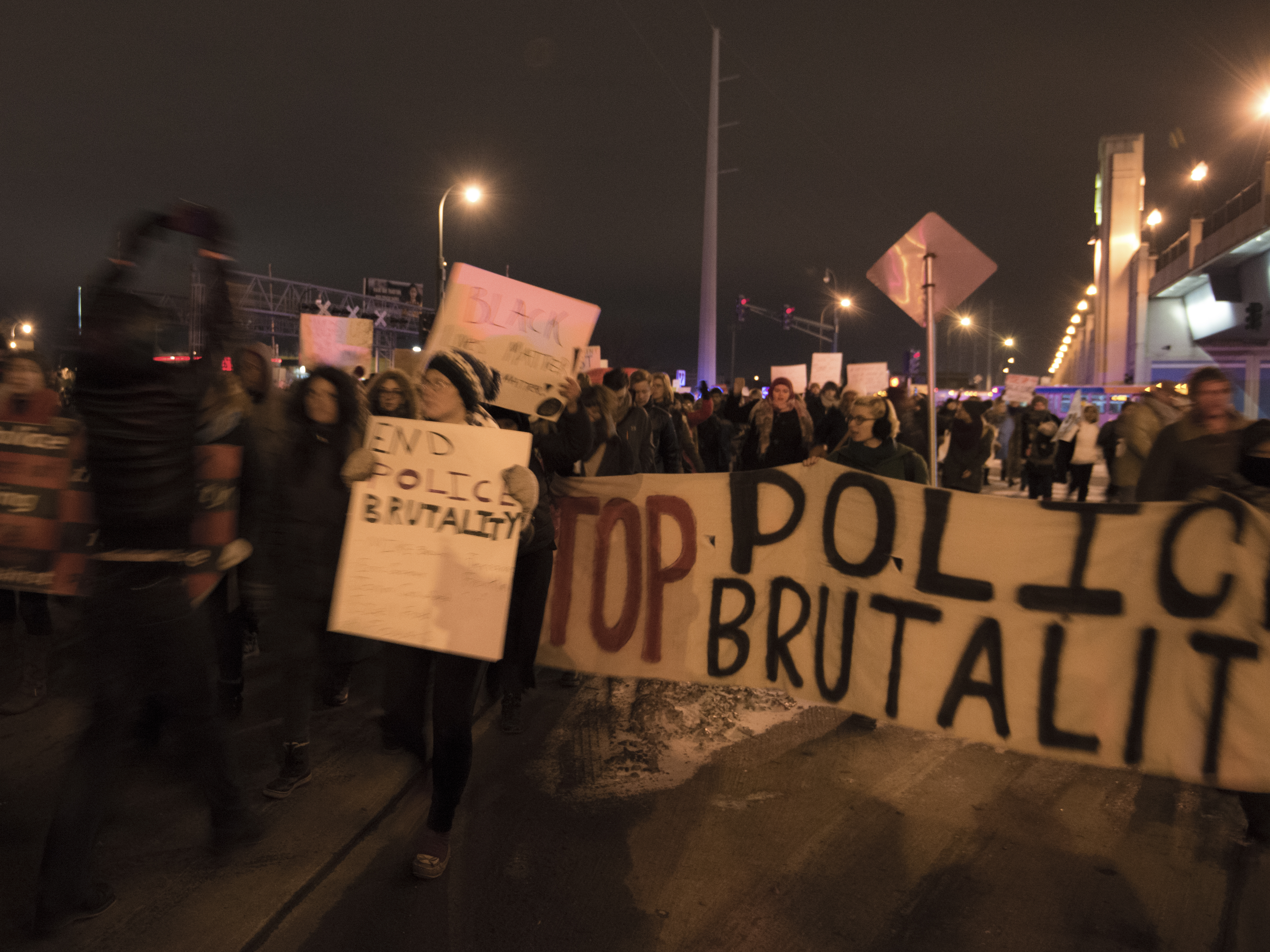
Protest against police brutality after the shooting of Michael Brown

In a report released concerning the shooting of Michael Brown in Ferguson, Missouri, the Department of Justice admitted to Ferguson Police Departments pattern of racial bias. The department argued that it is typically an effort to ticket as many low-income black residents as possible in an attempt to raise local budget revenue through fines and court fees.

=== Statistics ===
Data released by the US Bureau of Justice Statistics (2011) showed that from 2003 to 2009 at least 4,813 people died while being arrested by local police. Of the deaths classified as law enforcement homicides, there were 2,876 deaths; of those, 1,643 or 57.1% of the deaths were "people of color".

According to the police violence tracking website fatalencounters.org showed the records of over 29,000 people were killed in police interactions across the US since 2000. In 2016, police killed 574 White Americans, 266 African Americans, 183 Hispanics, 24 Native Americans, and 21 Asians. However, for every million in population, police killed 10.13 Native Americans, 6.66 African Americans, 3.23 Hispanics, 2.9 White Americans, and 1.17 Asians.

According to the 2020 Police Violence Report, 1,126 people were killed by police, of which in 16 cases police officers were charged with a crime. 620 of the deaths began with police officers responding to reports of non-violent offenses or no crime. 81 people killed by the police were unarmed.

Sam Sinyangwe, founder of the Mapping Police Violence project, stated in 2015 that "black people are three times more likely to be killed by police in the United States than white people. More unarmed black people were killed by police than unarmed white people last year, even though only 14% of the population are black people." According to the Mapping Police Violence project, in 2019, there were only 27 days where police in the United States didn't kill someone.

Critics of police brutality also note that sometimes this abuse of force or power can extend to police officer civilian life as well. For example, critics note that women in around 40% of police officer families have experienced domestic violence and that police officers are convicted of misdemeanors and felonies at a rate of more than six times higher than concealed carry weapon (CCW) permit holders.

== Public reaction ==
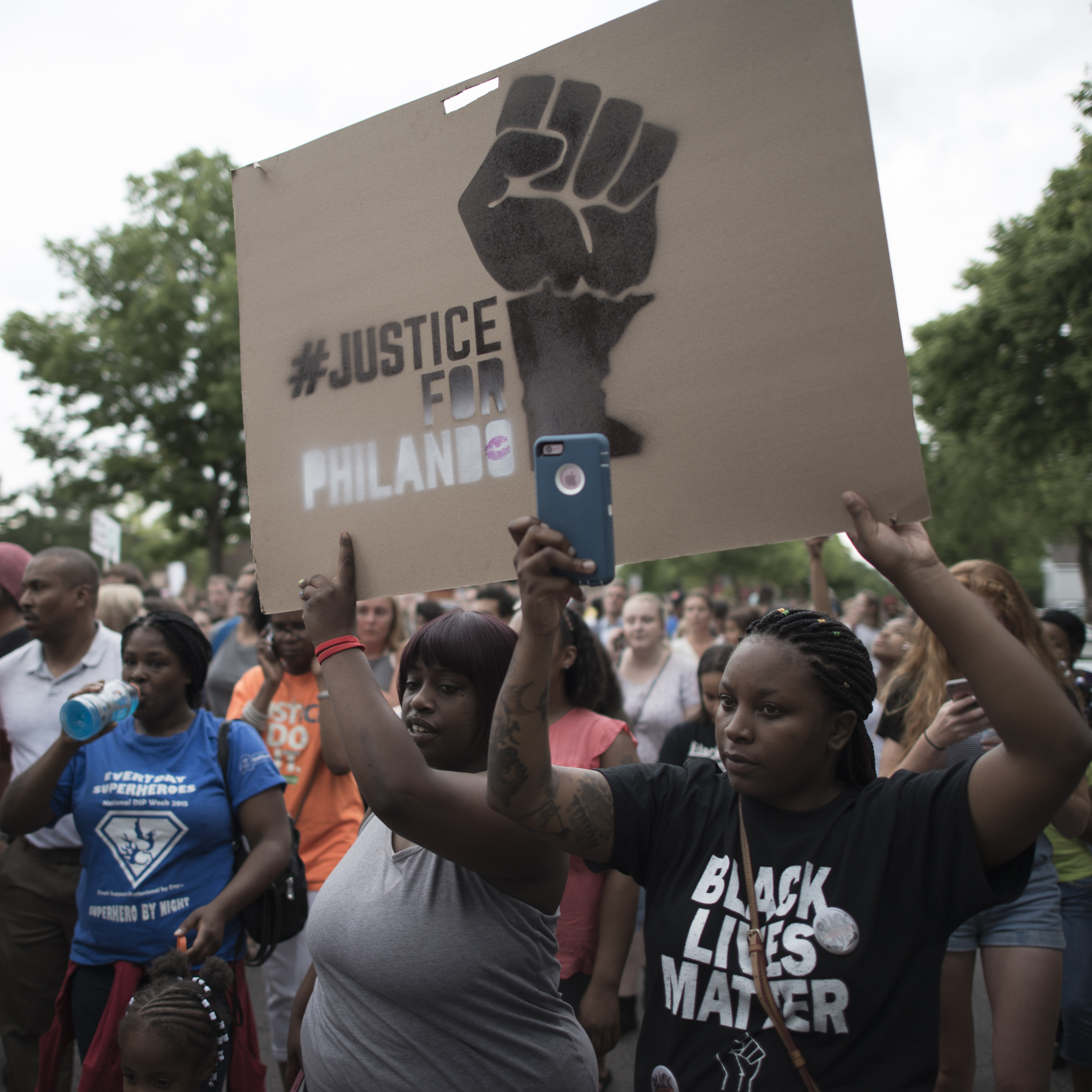
Protest march in response to the Philando Castile shooting, St. Paul, Minnesota, July 7, 2016

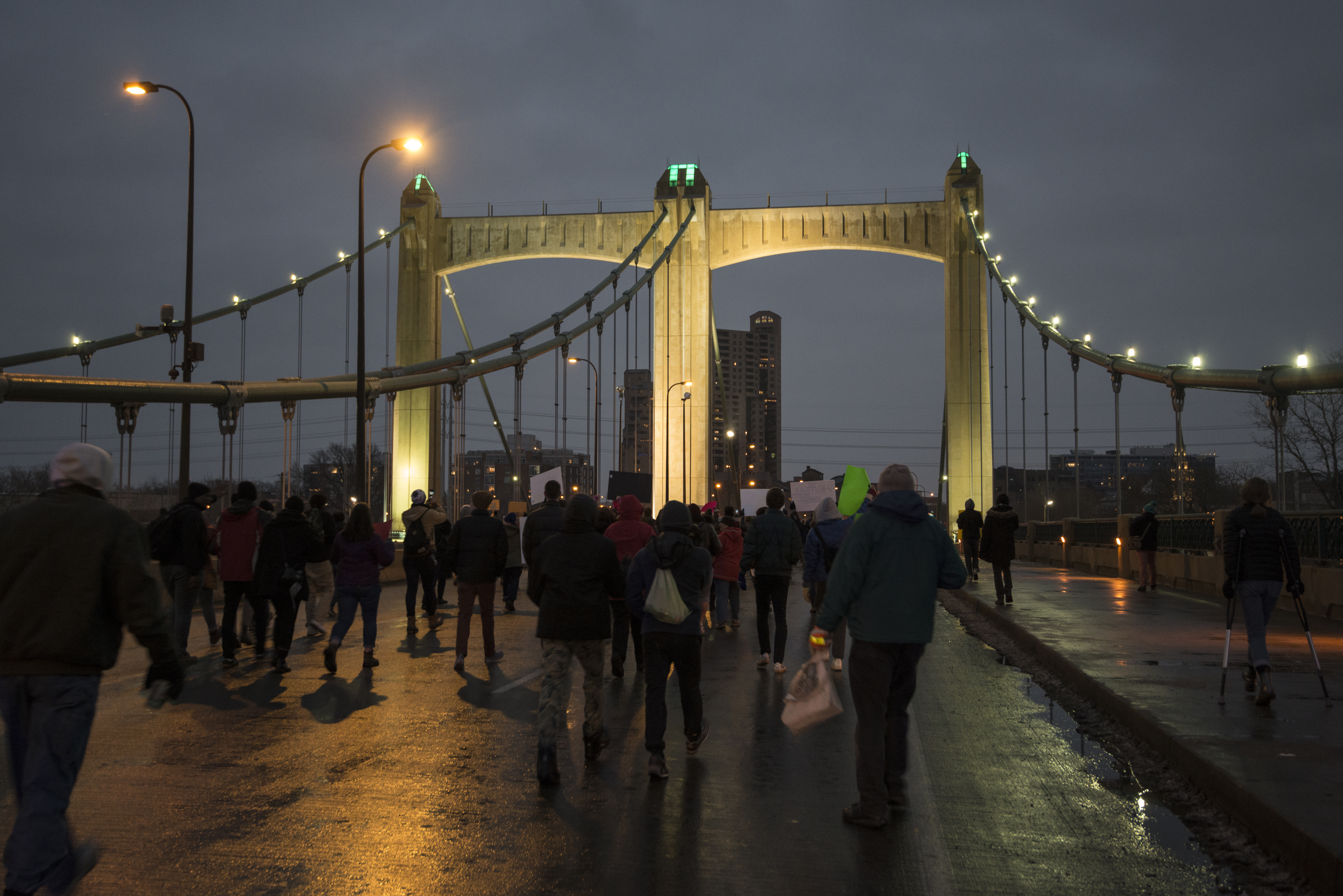
Minneapolis high school students protesting the shooting of Michael Brown on the Hennepin Avenue Bridge

A 2001 publication noted that local media rarely reported scandals involving out-of-town police unless events made it onto a network videotape. According to a 2002 analysis, there is often a dramatic increase in unfavorable attitudes toward the police in the wake of highly publicized events such as the Rampart scandal in the late 1990s and the killings of Amadou Diallo (February 1999) and Patrick Dorismond (March 2000) in New York City. A 1997 study found that when viewers are shown footage of police arrests, they may be more likely to perceive the police conduct as brutal if the arresting officers are Caucasian.

Public opinion polls following the 1991 beating of Rodney King in Los Angeles and the 1992 killing of Malice Green in Detroit indicate that the incidents appear to have had their greatest effect on specific perceptions of the way local police treat black people, and markedly less effect on broader perceptions of the extent of discrimination against them.

To draw attention to the issue of police brutality in America, multiple basketball players for the NBA, including Kyrie Irving and LeBron James, wore shirts labeled "I Can't Breathe", referring to the death of Eric Garner at the hands of the New York City Police Department on July 17, 2014. Concerned African-Americans also started a movement referred to as "Black Lives Matter" to try to help people understand how police are affecting African-American lives, initially prompted by the 2013 acquittal of George Zimmerman of the 2012 killing of Trayvon Martin in Sanford, Florida, and further sparked by the shooting of Michael Brown in Ferguson, Missouri, on August 9, 2014. In 2016, Colin Kaepernick, a quarterback then playing for the San Francisco 49ers, started a protest movement by refusing to stand for the national anthem at the start of games, receiving widespread support and widespread condemnation, including from then-President Donald Trump.

In May and June 2020, support for the Black Lives Matter movement surged among Americans as a result of the protests and unrest that broke out across the United States following the murder of George Floyd in Minneapolis. A tracking poll by Civiqs found that, for the first time ever, more white Americans supported the Black Lives Matter movement than opposed it. Democratic presidential nominee Joe Biden condemned police violence against African American communities and called for racial justice while speaking at George Floyd's funeral service.

While many celebrities have joined in on the "Black Lives Matter" campaign, many of the initiatives occurring in communities across the country are led by local members of the Black Lives Matter Global Network. The purpose of this network is to demand change at the local level and stop unfair punishment or brutality towards Black communities.

== Legal and institutional controls ==
Responsibility for investigating police misconduct in the United States has mainly fallen on local and state governments. The federal government does investigate misconduct but only does so when local and state governments fail to look into cases of misconduct.

Laws intended to protect against police abuse of authority include the Fourth Amendment to the United States Constitution, which prohibits unreasonable searches and seizures; the Fifth Amendment to the United States Constitution, which protects individuals against self-incrimination and being deprived of life, liberty, or property without due process; the Eighth Amendment to the United States Constitution, which bans cruel and unusual punishments; the Fourteenth Amendment to the United States Constitution, which includes the Due Process and Equal Protection Clauses; the Civil Rights Act of 1871; and the Federal Tort Claims Act. The U.S. Department of Justice prosecutes police officers who violate people's federal constitutional rights; federal prosecutors primarily apply Conspiracy Against Rights, 18 U.S.C. Section 241; and Deprivation of Rights Under Color of Law, 18 U.S.C. Section 242. The Civil Rights Act has evolved into a key U.S. law in brutality cases. However, 42 U.S.C. § 1983 has been assessed as ultimately ineffective in deterring police brutality. The federal government can place charges on police officers who commit police misconduct. These prosecutions do not often occur as the federal government tends to defer to local and state governments for prosecution. The federal government also has the ability to investigate police departments if they are committing unlawful actions. When an investigation reveals violations by a police department, the Department of Justice can use §14141 to file a lawsuit. Like other tools at their disposal, the federal government also rarely uses this statute. In a 1996 law journal article, it was argued that Judges often give police convicted of brutality light sentences on the grounds that they have already been punished by damage to their careers. A 1999 article attributed much of this difficulty in combating police brutality to the overwhelming power of the stories mainstream American culture tells about the encounters leading to police violence.

In 1978, surveys of police officers found that police brutality, along with sleeping on duty, was viewed as one of the most common and least likely to be reported forms of police deviance other than corruption.

In Tennessee v. Garner (1985), the Supreme Court ruled that the Fourth Amendment prevents police from using deadly force on a fleeing suspect unless the police have good reason to believe that the suspect is a danger to others.

The Supreme Court in Graham v. Connor (1989) stated that the reasonableness of a police officer using force should be based on what the officer's viewpoint was when the crime occurred. Reasonableness should also factor in things like the suspect's threat level and if attempts were made to avoid being arrested.

In 1967, the U.S. Supreme Court introduced the legal doctrine of qualified immunity, originally with the rationale of protecting law enforcement officials from frivolous lawsuits and financial liability in cases where they acted in good faith in an unclear legal situation. Starting in around 2005, courts increasingly applied this doctrine to cases involving the use of excessive force, eventually leading to widespread criticism that it "has become a nearly failsafe tool to let police brutality go unpunished and deny victims their constitutional rights" (as summarized in a 2020 Reuters report).

On May 25, 2022, President Joe Biden signed an executive order that would ban chokeholds and carotid restraints, adopt body camera policies, limit the use of no-knock warrants to certain circumstances, and adopt updated use-of-force standards that encourage de-escalation for all federal law enforcement agents.

== In art ==
In July 2019, the Glimmerglass Festival in Cooperstown, New York, premiered Jeanine Tesori and Tazewell Thompson's opera Blue about African-American teenagers as an 'endangered species' often falling victim to police brutality.

== See also ==
- Blacks in Law Enforcement of America
- Death in custody § United States
- Gypsy cop
- Henry A. Wallace Police Crime Public Database
- Human rights in the United States
- List of cases of police brutality by date
- Lists of killings by law enforcement officers in the United States
- List of unarmed African Americans killed by law enforcement officers in the United States
- Moral insanity
- Pain compliance
- Peelian principles
- Photography Is Not a Crime
- Pitchess motion
- Police state
- Police use of deadly force in the United States
- Proactive policing
- Psychopathy
- Rough ride (police brutality)
