= Public Safety Employer-Employee Cooperation Act of 2007 =

Proposed United States legislation

- Long title: To provide collective bargaining rights for public safety officers employed by States or their political subdivisions.
- Enacted by: the 110th United States Congress

Legislative history
- Introduced in the House as H.R. 980 by Dale Kildee (D-MI) and John Duncan (R-TN) on February 12, 2007; Committee consideration by Education and Labor; Passed the House on July 17, 2007 (314–97)

Public Safety Employer-Employee Cooperation Act of 2007
- Long title: A bill to provide collective bargaining rights for public safety officers employed by States or their political subdivisions.
- Enacted by: the 110th United States Congress

Legislative history
- Introduced in the Senate as S. 2123 by Judd Gregg (R-NH) on October 1, 2007; Committee consideration by Health, Education, Labor, and Pensions

The Public Safety Employer-Employee Cooperation Act of 2007, introduced in the 110th Congress(H.R. 980, S. 2123), proposed to establish minimum standards for state collective bargaining laws for public safety officers.

== Provisions ==
The bill would ensure:

- The right to join a union and have the union recognized by the employer
- The right of public safety officers to bargain over wages, hours, and working conditions
- A dispute resolution mechanism, such as fact finding or mediation
- Enforcement of contracts through state courts

Although the act would allow the parties to seek mediation to resolve their differences, it would not force employers into binding arbitration.

The Federal Labor Relations Authority shall, within 180 days of enactment, make a determination as to whether a State substantially provides for the rights and responsibilities described in the Act.

The Federal Labor Relations Authority shall have the authority to:

- Determine the appropriateness of units for labor organization representation
- Supervise or conduct elections to determine whether a labor organization has been selected as an exclusive representative by a voting majority of the employees
- Resolve issues relating to the duty to bargain in good faith
- Conduct hearings and resolve complaints of unfair labor practices
- Resolve exceptions to the awards of arbitrators
- Protect the right of each employee to form, join, or assist any labor organization, or to refrain from any such activity, freely and without fear of penalty or reprisal, and protect each employee in the exercise of such right
- Take such other actions as are necessary and appropriate to effectively administer the Act

Strikes and lockouts are prohibited by the act.

== Legislative history ==
Previous versions of the Public Safety Employer-Employee Cooperation Act narrowly missed a 60-vote supermajority (required for cloture) in the U.S. Senate.

The House Committee on Labor and Education approved the legislation on June 20, 2007, with an overwhelmingly bipartisan vote of 42–1.

The bill passed the full U.S. House of Representatives, 314–97 (with 20 not voting), on July 17, 2007.

On October 1, 2007, the Senate version of the bill (S.2123) was introduced by Senators Judd Gregg (R-NH) and Edward Kennedy (D-MA) with 10 Republican cosponsors. However, on December 14, 2007, the act was offered and later withdrawn as an amendment to the 2007 U.S. Farm Bill with opposition led by Jim DeMint (R-SC) and Mike Enzi (R-WY).

On May 14, 2008, the Senate held a procedural vote to begin debate on the bill. While the 69–29 tally seemed to indicate the bill would pass the Senate by a veto-proof margin, Senate Democrats dropped the bill May 15, 2008, after Republicans complained they didn't have enough time to offer amendments. Senate Majority Leader Harry Reid said he did not have enough votes to force final consideration of the bill. According to a press release by the IAFF, Senator Lindsey Graham (R-SC) introduced a non-germane motion to attach Senator John McCain's (R-AZ) GI Bill of Rights to S.2123. The press release refers to the motion as "a move designed both to sidetrack debate on the bill and boost the candidacy of presumptive Republican presidential nominee John McCain." The maneuvering prompted an angry rebuke from Senator Kennedy on the Senate floor. "We have seen this parliamentary gimmick that has taken place offered by the Republican leadership that is a slap in the face to every firefighter and police officer and first responder in the country." Kennedy also questioned whether or not John McCain approved the Republicans' strategy. In spite of the apparent discord, Senator Reid indicated that the bill was not dead and that Democrats and Republicans would be able to work out a bipartisan deal on how to handle amendments.

== Support ==
The bill is a top legislative priority of the International Association of Fire Fighters, International Union of Police Associations, AFL–CIO, and Fraternal Order of Police. The bill is also supported by the National Association of Police Organizations and the American Federation of State, County, and Municipal Employees.

== Opposition ==
The National League of Cities, the National Sheriffs' Association, the International Association of Chiefs of Police, the National Association of Counties, the National Right to Work Committee, the National Alliance for Worker and Employer Rights, the National Public Employer Labor Relations Association, the International Public Management Association for Human Resources, and the International Municipal Lawyers Association are lobbying against the bill.

The Heritage Foundation has been particularly critical, and claims that the bill is part of an attack on volunteer fire departments. However, The National Volunteer Fire Council wrote an article published in Fire Engineering magazine explaining how the NVFC worked diligently with Senate staff to include language in the Senate version of the bill that protects the right of career firefighters to volunteer during off-duty hours.

== See also ==
- Collective bargaining
- Right-to-work law
- At-will employment
- Federal Labor Relations Authority
- Department of Public Safety
