= Blacks in Law Enforcement of America =

Blacks in Law Enforcement of America is an African-American police organization, formed in the 1960s.

It speaks on behalf of black members of the community as well as black police officers, and also advocates against racial discrimination within police forces.

In 2016 Blacks in Law Enforcement of America opposed the Fraternal Order of Police for its endorsement of Donald Trump for president, saying it did not reflect the will of the membership and calling on groups of black police officers to oppose Trump.

The organization has praised police departments which built good community ties, including Urbana and Champaign, IL, and Cincinnati, OH.

== See also ==
- Black Codes (United States), also called the Black Laws
- Racial segregation in the United States
