= The Shul of New York =

Liberal non-denominational synagogue in New York City

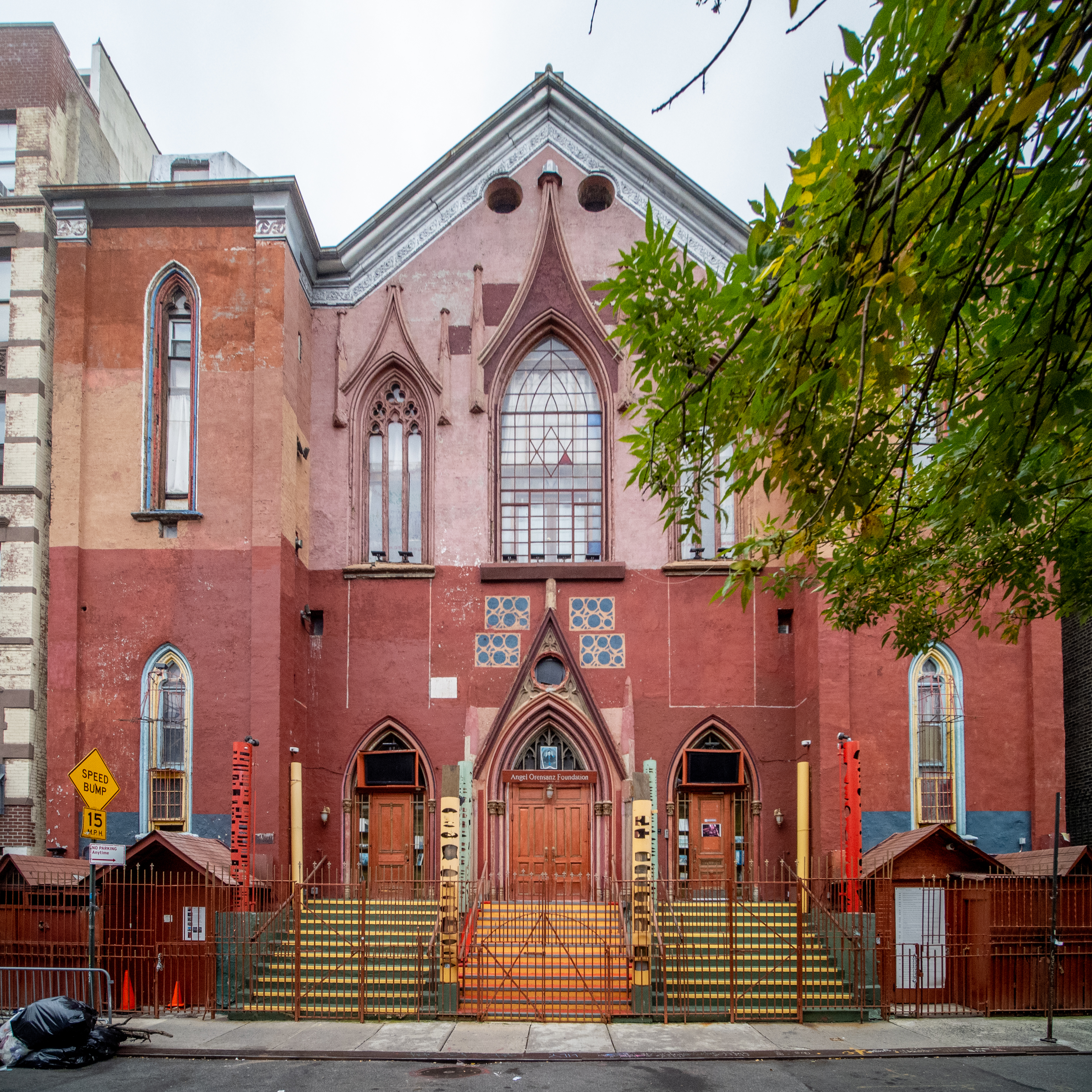
- The Shul of New York, located in the Angel Orensanz Center

- Location in Lower Manhattan

Religion
- Affiliation: Judaism
- Rite: Non-denominational
- Ecclesiastical or organizational status: Synagogue
- Leadership: Rabbi Susan Falk
- Status: Active

Location
- Location: 172 Norfolk Street, Lower East Side, Manhattan, New York City, New York 10002
- Country: United States
- Interactive map of The Shul of New York
- Coordinates: 40°43′16″N 73°59′09″W

Architecture
- Architect: Alexander Saeltzer
- Type: Synagogue
- Style: Gothic Revival
- Completed: 1849

Specifications
- Capacity: 1,500 worshippers
- Length: 90 feet (27 m)
- Width: 70 feet (21 m)
- Materials: Brick; stucco

Website
- www.shulofny.org
- Anshe Slonim Synagogue
- New York City Landmark
- Designated NYCL: June 14, 1983

The Shul of New York is a Jewish liberal non-denominational congregation and synagogue that is located within the Angel Orensanz Center, at 172 Norfolk Street, Lower East Side, Manhattan, New York City, New York, United States.

The building used by the congregation, the Angel Orensanz Center, was built in 1849, making it the oldest surviving synagogue building in New York City, and the fourth-oldest surviving synagogue building in the United States. It was the largest synagogue in the United States at the time of its construction and is one of the few built in the Gothic Revival style.

Since 1849, at various stages, the building has been used as a synagogue, by the Reform Anshe Chesed Congregation (1849–1873), the Orthodox Congregation Shaari Rachmim (1873–1886), the Orthodox First Hungarian Congregation Ohab Zedek (1886–1921), the Orthodox Sheveth Achim Anshe Slonim Synagogue (1921–1974 and then abandoned), and then acquired by the government of New York City following vandalization (1981), after which it was sold to a succession of owners: Hungarian Development, Inc. (1983), Seashells, Inc. (1984), and finally Angel Lopez Orensanz (1986).

== History ==
=== Use by Ansche Chesed ===
The synagogue was built by Congregation Ansche Chesed (”people of kindness”), at the time known as Anshe Slonim. Formed in 1825, Congregation Ansche Chesed consisted primarily of German Jews, as well as Dutch Jews and Polish Jews. They were mostly recent immigrants. It was the third Jewish congregation in New York City, after Shearith Israel (1655; from which the members of Congregation Ansche Chesed broke away) and B'nai Jeshurun (1825).

Congregation Ansche Chesed purchased the three lots upon which the synagogue was built, at 172 Norfolk Street (between Stanton Street and East Houston Street), on the Lower East Side of New York City in April 1849, for $10,500 (today $406,000). The lots had originally been part of Peter Stuyvesant's estate. The synagogue building was designed by Eisenach (Germany)-born architect Alexander Saeltzer, who was engaged in February 1849. and designed it in the Gothic Revival style.

The building opened in 1849 as Anshe Chesed Synagogue and was also known as the Norfolk Street Congregation. The synagogue was formally opened and consecrated on May 16, 1850, with New York City's mayor and a number of members of the New York City Common Council and Christian clergy among the invited guests. It was the largest synagogue in the United States and could hold up to 1,500 worshipers, with men on the main floor and women in the gallery. It was the first German-synagogue in New York and the second Reform synagogue after Congregation Emanu-El (1845).

Its members were traditional in their beliefs and the congregation was "moderately traditionalist." Services were conducted primarily in German. It diverged from Orthodox tradition in that its hazzan and the pulpit faced the congregation, rather than being located in the center of the congregation, and the services were accompanied by musical instruments, including an organ that was added in 1869 at the same time as family pews were introduced, with men and women sitting together. A choir of men and women was also introduced. In the 1850s, it had the largest membership of any synagogue in the United States. Munich-born Dr. Max Lilienthal was the first rabbi at the new synagogue. Dr. Jonas Bondi became the synagogue's rabbi in 1858.

In 1874, Congregation Ansche Chesed merged with Congregation Adas Jeshurun, relocated uptown to Lexington Avenue and East 63rd Street, and formed Congregation Beth El. That congregation subsequently merged into Congregation Emanu-El, in 1927.

=== Later congregations ===
After Ansche Chesed left, the synagogue was used by several Eastern European Orthodox Jewish congregations, which reconfigured the space to the more traditional orientation and removed the organ. It was first sold to Congregation Shaari Rachmim (Gates of Mercy) in 1873, which used it until 1886. Then, as Shaari Rachim moved to New York City's Upper West Side, the synagogue was sold to The First Hungarian Congregation Ohab Zedek (To Love Righteousness) in 1886, which used it as its home until 1921. A congregation named Sheveth Achim Anshe Slonim (People of Slonim, Belarus; founded in 1888) worshiped there from 1921 to 1974 and called it Anshe Slonim Synagogue. By 1974, membership in the synagogue had dwindled as the neighborhood changed and the Slonim community had dispersed. The synagogue was abandoned and was vandalized.
