= Mordecai Jalomstein =

- Born: 1835; Suwałki, Congress Poland
- Died: August 18, 1897 (aged 61–62); New York City, United States
- Occupation: Journalist
- Writing career
- Pen name: Yashan
- Language: Hebrew, Yiddish

Mordecai ben David Jalomstein (Note: Also known as Marcus Jalomstein.) (Hebrew: מרדכי בן דוד יהלמשטיין; 1835 – August 18, 1897) was a Polish-born American journalist and writer.

== Biography ==
Mordecai Jalomstein was born in Suwałki, then part of Russian Poland, in 1835. His father, David Jalomstein, was a respected rabbi. At the age of 12, he was sent to study at the yeshiva of Rabbi Moshe Yitzḥak Avigdor in Sejny for three years.

In 1861, he moved to England, where be befriended Louis Loewe. He first emigrated to the United States in 1865, but soon returned to Europe, and learned typesetting in Warsaw. He permanently settled in New York City in 1870 or 1871.

Jalomstein was well versed in Talmudic and modern Hebrew literature, and was recognized for his linguistic proficiency. He served for several years as editor of Hirsch Bernstein's Ha-Tzofeh be-Eretz ha-Ḥadashah, the first Hebrew-language periodical published in the United States. For about twenty years, Jalomstein was the chief collaborator on the Yiddishes Gazetten ('Jewish Gazette'), a Yiddish-language newspaper in New York established by his brother-in-law, K. H. Sarasohn.

Jalomstein was a regular American correspondent for the Hebrew newspaper Ha-Melitz, contributing under the pseudonym "Yashan" (יש״ן) He also contributed to the periodical Ha-'Ivri. His historical work Divre Yeme Artzot ha-Berit ('Chronicles of the United States') was published in New York in 1893 and consisted of serialized articles originally printed in Ha-'Ivri over a two-year period.

Alongside Bernstein, Sarasohn, J. D. Eisenstein, and others, Jalomstein was a founding member of Shoḥare Sefat Ever, a Hebrew language society founded in New York in 1880. He was appointed secretary of the Society and placed in charge of its reading room.

He died from throat cancer on August 18, 1897, at his home at 323 East 10th Street.
