= Kasriel Hirsch Sarasohn =

American journalist (1835–1905)

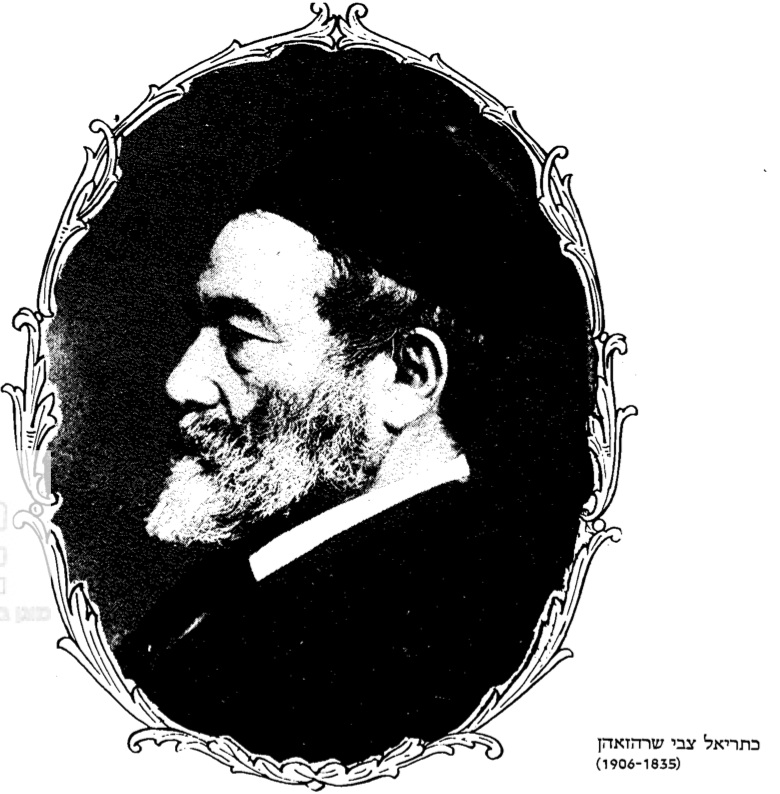
- Born: 1835; Paiser, Suwalki Province, Congress Poland
- Died: January 12, 1905 (aged 69–70); New York City, United States
- Occupation: Publisher
- Spouse: Bashe Jalomstein Sarasohn

Kasriel Hirsch Sarasohn (1835 – January 12, 1905) was an American journalist who published several newspapers in New York. He was also known as Kasriel Tzvi Sarasohn, with Tzvi being the Hebrew version of the Yiddish Hirsch, His publishing organizatoion was a partnership with his wife, Bashe, and her brother, Mordechai Yahlomstein.

== Biography ==
Sarasohn's father was Eliyahu (Elijah) Sarasohn (Hebrew: אליהו שרהזון), a rabbi in present-day Poland (then Russia). He was born in 1835 in the town of Paiser, close to Sobalk, Suwalki Province, where his father was the town rabbi.

Sarasohn initially studied for the rabbinate, but abandoned his preparation and emigrated to the United States in 1866, on the advice of his brother-in-law. The Sarasohns settled in New York City in 1871. In 1872, he founded The New York Jewish Weekly (ניו יארקער אידישע צײַטונג), but it foundered after five months. The early days of the publishing house were based at the Sarasohn home at 175 East Broadway, with family members doing the typesetting.

In 1874 he tried again, publishing the Jewish Gazette with his brother-in-law, Mordechai Yahlomstein. It was successful, being published for 54 years. He made several attempts to publish a daily paper, which were unsuccessful, but was finally able to publish the successful Jewish Daily News (יידישעס טאגעבלאט) in the mid 1880s (sources vary on the exact year, 1883, 1885, or 1886). It merged with the Morning-Journal in 1928, at the time of its publisher's (son Ezekiel's) death.

He published Getsl Zelikovitsh's loose Yiddish translation of the United States Constitution in 1892.

Sarasohn also published a Hebrew paper, Ha'iviri at a loss from 1892 to 1898. (This was not related to Meir Bar-Ilan's weekly of the same name that was later published, first in Berlin, and later in New York.)

When he began the publication of his journals, there were no other newspapers printed in Hebrew or Yiddish in the United States, making it difficult to obtain the necessary Hebrew letter type.

Eventually, his newspapers became the most popular in the Orthodox Jewish community.

Toward the end of his life, in 1903, Sarasohn also published his father's commentary on the Hagaddah, called Agadas Eliyahu.

He died in New York City on January 12, 1905.

His papers are stored in a special collection of the American Jewish Historical Society.

Among his children, his son Abraham was a successful lawyer. His son Yechezkel (Ezekiel) took over as publisher upon Kasriel Saransohn's retirement. Ezekiel had previously run a similar newspaper, the Chicago Daily Jewish Courier, and was also president of the Jewish Press Publishing Company, which put out the Morning-Journal, though they were independent of each other in that period.

Sarason's funeral procession attracted a crowd of 75,000. The funeral took place at Congregation Ohab Zedek's building on Norfolk Street. He was buried at Union Fields Cemetery.

== Lawsuits ==
=== Libel ===
Saransohn published form the viewpoint of Orthodox Judaism. Among his competitors was Dos Abendblatt (The Evening Paper), the daily organ of the Socialist Labor Party, published by the Workingmen Publishing Association. Abendblatt staff writers Phillip Krantz and Bernard Feigenbaum wrote a number of investigative journalism articles that impugned Sarasohn's handling of charitable money and bona fides as a promoter of Zionism.

In 1898, fearing that their campaign was damaging his reputation and threatening his credibility amongst their common customer base, Saransohn sued "Jacob Rombro" (Krantz' pseudonym) for libel. During the trial, Abendblatt published additional pieces decrying the depiction of the socialist faction as anarchists, hedonist socialists, demons, and abusers of the rights of the free press.

Abraham Saransohn was lawyer for the plaintiff. They won the legal battle in 1901, though the jury reduced his requested compensation of US $20,000 to $3,500 plus expenses.

=== Estate ===
Abraham, Ezekiel, their sister's family, and their mother Bashe (Bertha) could not agree on the disposition of the newspapers, and filed lawsuits against each other. At the time, the publishing company netted US $50,000 a year (currently $1,349,247).

Saransohn's company was called Sarasohn & Son. The "son" was Ezekiel. In addition, Kasriel's son-in-law, Leon Kamaiky, was also a partial owner. Eldest son Abraham, beng a lawyer, had his own income was not involved as either a principal or employee.

Upon Kasriel's death, Bertha (Kasriel's widow) and Abraham were appointed administrators of the estate. Ezekiel and Leon, fearing the paper was being sold out from under them without their say, and having a one-third ownership stake each, sought to have a court referee arrange for a slate at auction instead. Abraham argued against this in court, as he believed that this action might take the papers out of the estate, and leave him without his father's one-third share that was willed to him.

== Charitable works ==
In 1882, Sarasohn founded the Hebrew Sheltering House, now known as the Hebrew Shelter House and Home for the Aged. In 1901, he visited Palestine, and on his return was elected president of the committee for the collection of funds for the support of the poor in Palestine. He was chairman of the committee for the Kishinev sufferers. He was Vice-President of the Union of Orthodox Congregations of America. He was active in the Hebrew Immigrant Aid Society, which in 1890 absorbed a similar charitable organization that he founded in 1882.
