= Astor Library Building =

Historic building in Manhattan, New York

- New York Shakespeare Festival Public Theater; Astor Library Building / Public Theater Building
- U.S. National Register of Historic Places
- New York State Register of Historic Places
- New York City Landmark
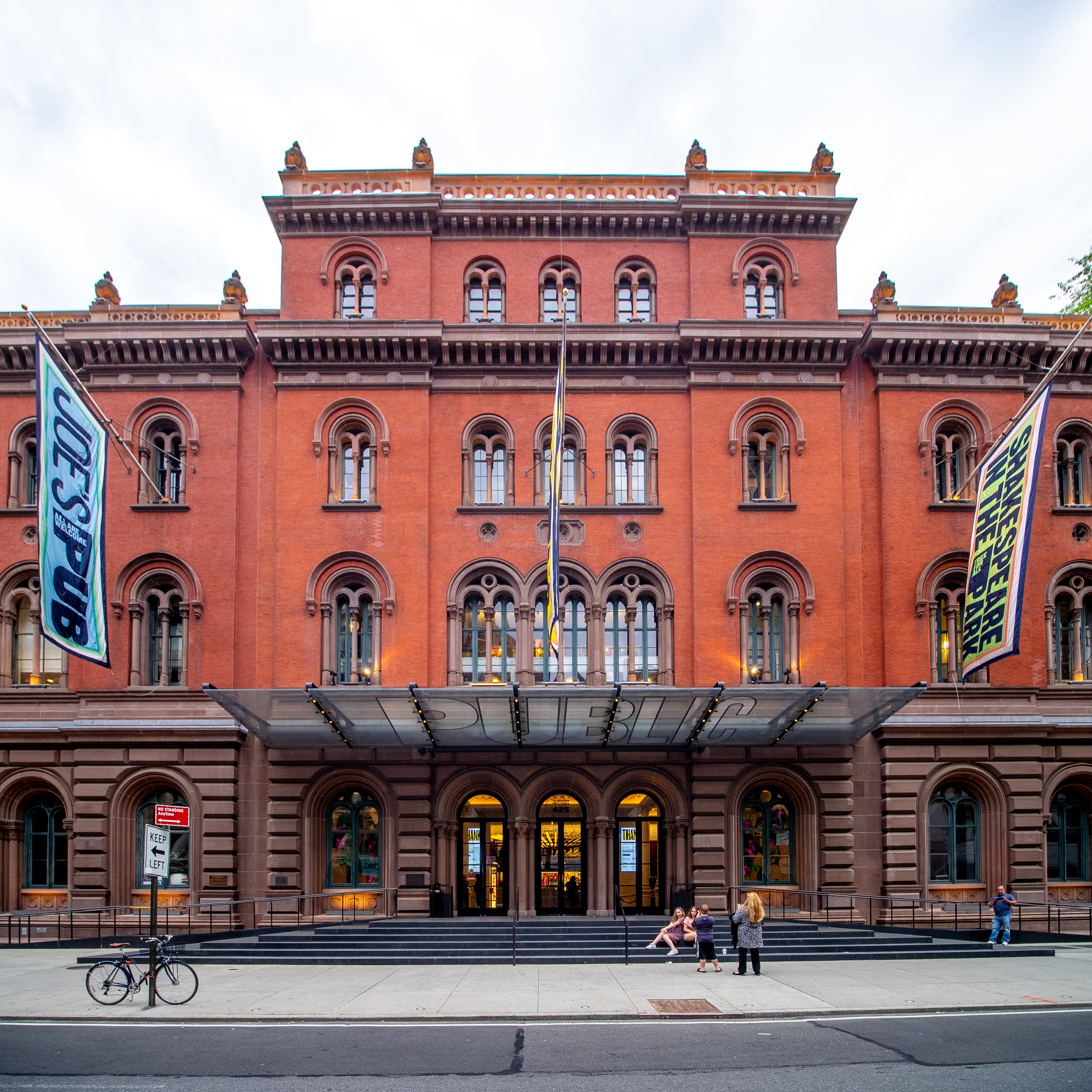
- Interactive map of the Astor Library Building
- Location: 425 Lafayette Street, Manhattan, New York, US
- Coordinates: 40°43′44″N 73°59′31″W
- Built: 1850–1854, 1856–1859, 1880–1881
- Architects: Alexander Saeltzer, Griffith Thomas, Thomas Stent
- Architectural style: Rundbogenstil
- NRHP reference No.: 70000424
- NYSRHP No.: 06101.000364
- NYCL No.: 0016

Significant dates
- Added to NRHP: 1970-12-02
- Designated NYSRHP: 1980-06-23
- Designated NYCL: 1965-10-26

The Astor Library Building (also known as the Public Theater Building and Joseph Papp Public Theater) is a theater and former library building at 425 Lafayette Street in the NoHo neighborhood of Manhattan in New York City, New York, US. It was built in three stages between 1854 and 1881 for the Astor Library and, since 1967, has housed the Public Theater. The building was one of the first properties designated as a city landmark by the New York City Landmarks Preservation Commission in 1965. It is also listed on the National Register of Historic Places.

The library was built by William B. Astor, son of the library's founder, John Jacob Astor. The original structure was constructed to designs by Alexander Saeltzer, while subsequent additions by Griffith Thomas (in 1856–1859) and Thomas Stent (in 1880–1881) followed Saeltzer's original design. The building is made of brick and stone and is mostly three stories high, except for the central section, which rises four stories. Inside were features such as a staircase leading to a double-height reading room. The modern-day building has six stages for the Public Theater, which reuse some of the original interiors, including the reading room and lobby.

Work on the building commenced in 1850. The original portion of the building opened for limited use on January 9, 1854, and was opened to general use on February 1, 1854. Partly due to the presence of the Astor Library, bookbinding and publishing firms such as The De Vinne Press and J.J. Little & Co. settled around Lafayette Place. The Astor Library later became part of the New York Public Library, which abandoned the building in 1911, when the books were moved to the newly constructed New York Public Library Main Branch by Bryant Park. In 1920, the Hebrew Immigrant Aid Society purchased it. By 1965 it was in disuse and faced demolition. The Public Theater (then known as the New York Shakespeare Festival) persuaded the city to purchase it for use as a theater, and it was converted for theater use by Giorgio Cavaglieri, reopening in October 1967. The building was renovated in the early 2010s.

== Site ==
The Astor Library (Public Theater) Building is at 425 Lafayette Street, in the NoHo neighborhood of Manhattan in New York City. The New York City Department of City Planning cites the rectangular land lot as measuring 29,670 square feet (2,756 m^{2}), with a frontage of 249 1/12 feet (76 m) on Lafayette Street (Note: Another source cites the building as measuring 220 feet (67 m) along Lafayette Street.) and a depth of 155 1/6 feet (47 m). The Astor Place Tower is on the same block to the north, while the De Vinne Press Building, Merchant's House Museum, and Samuel Tredwell Skidmore House are to the south. The former Astor Opera House is diagonally across Lafayette Street and Astor Place to the north. Other nearby buildings include the Colonnade Row directly across Lafayette Street to the west; the Cooper Union to the east; and the Schermerhorn Building to the south.

The building's site was historically part of the estate of German-American businessman John Jacob Astor, who acquired the land in 1803 between present-day Astor Place and Great Jones Street. Astor subsequently built his mansion and horse stable nearby. In the 1830s, the wealthiest New Yorkers started to relocate northward from the present-day Financial District of Manhattan, and settled along Lafayette Place (now Lafayette Street). At the time, the area surrounding Lafayette Place was still mostly undeveloped. Residential development in the area peaked at that time before moving northward in the 1840s and 1850s. The surrounding area became a printing hub after the American Civil War, and there were over 20 publishers nearby by the 1880s.

== Architecture ==
The Astor Library Building was built by William B. Astor, son of the library's founder, John Jacob Astor, and consists of three pavilions built in different eras. German-born architect Alexander Saeltzer, who had been the architect of the Anshe Chesed Synagogue, designed what is now the southern pavilion of the building in 1851–1854. The original building spanned 65 by 120 feet (20 by 37 m), with a height of about 70 feet (21 m). The center pavilion was designed by Griffith Thomas in 1856–1859, and the north pavilion was designed by Thomas Stent in 1880–1881; both expansions followed Saeltzer's original design. The three sections were called the north, middle, and south halls when the building was used as a library.

Contemporary sources characterized the building as a Byzantine-style structure. (Note: For examples of sources describing the building as Byzantine, see:) The building has also been described as Italianate, Venetian, Florentine, Romanesque Revival, round-arched Rundbogenstil, or German Renaissance in style. Much of the interior design dates to a 1966–1967 renovation by Giorgio Cavaglieri.

=== Facade ===
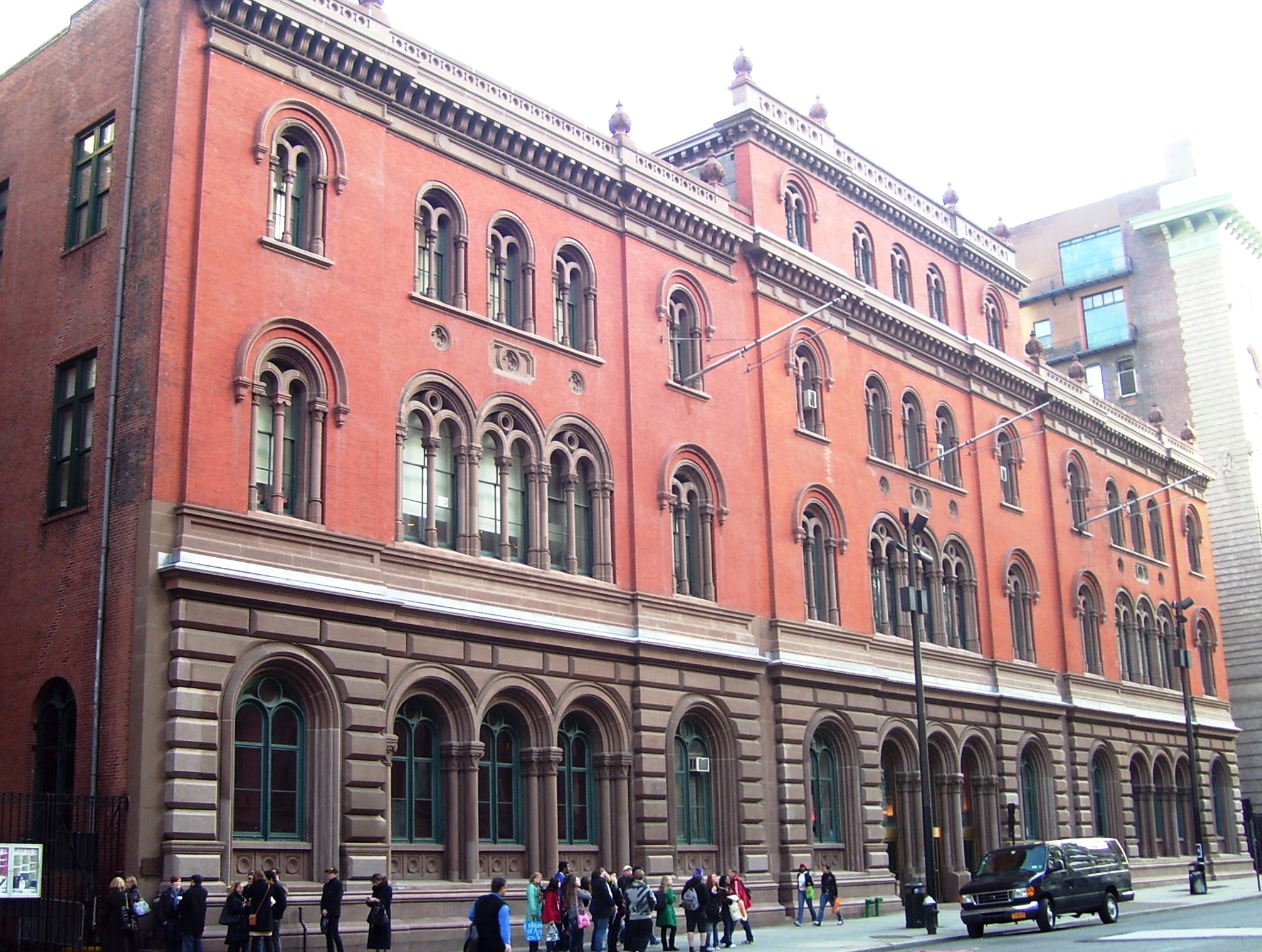
The building's facade seen from the northwest

The primary elevation of the facade, to the west, consists of two protruding sections flanking a recessed section. The recessed central section rises four stories, protruding about 18 feet (5.5 m) above the rest of the roof, with a width of 65 feet (20 m). The protruding side sections are three stories. The openings are grouped into fifteen bays. There are loading docks, entrances, and windows on the north and south (side) walls.

The facade rests on a stone foundation and is made of rusticated blocks of brownstone on the ground floor. There is an entrance within the brownstone base. After the second annex (the north pavilion) was constructed, the original entrance in the south pavilion was replaced by a small brownstone stoop. The stoop was cut back in 1912.

Above the ground floor, the facade is made of brick. The upper-story windows have brick arches trimmed with brownstone. There is a cornice with strapwork motifs and a frieze in the Ionic order just below the roofline. A parapet runs above the roof and is topped by urns. On the western elevation, the central section's fourth story has arched sash windows. Above the fourth story is a cornice with brackets, along with a parapet containing finials. The flat roof is paved in asphalt, with some chimneys.

=== Interior ===
The Astor Library Building's three portions were constructed using different methods; the older portions of the building are constructed using masonry, while later portions were built with an iron frame. The Astor Library Building was one of several late-19th-century buildings in New York City with interior ironwork, at a time when masonry load-bearing walls were still popular. The floor plan is irregular, and there is a basement in addition to the above-ground stories. The modern-day building includes six stages for the Public Theater. Many of the lobby spaces were preserved as part of the 1960s redesign, while the remainder of the theater was renovated to accommodate the stages. The interior retains its elaborate cornices, moldings, columns, and skylights. Other decorations were designed to blend with the historical architecture, including moldings that were treated to resemble wood.

==== Ground floor ====
The ground (first) floor of the original building had reading rooms on either side and a lecture room at the rear. The original section of the library had a marble staircase with 36 or 38 steps, ascending to the skylit reading room on the second floor. When the first annex (later the central pavilion) was constructed, the ground floor had a reading room in the front and a lecture room in the rear. After the second annex (the north pavilion) was constructed, the original staircase was partially demolished and replaced with a double stair. A marble entrance vestibule occupied the ground level of the central pavilion. Measuring 60 by 40 feet (18 by 12 m) across, it was decorated with statues of Greek and Roman literary figures. There were 24 such statues, resting on marble pedestals. A white marble staircase ascended to the central section of the second floor.

After the building became the Public Theater, the rear of the ground floor was initially used as offices. The lower section of the building contains the Newman Theater, which, with 299 seats, is the building's highest-capacity stage. The Newman Theater has a stage measuring 45 by 40 feet (14 by 12 m) across, comparable in size to a Broadway theater stage. Joe's Pub, a 160-seat, double-tier dining and performance venue with its own street entrance, is accessed from the building's lobby. Added to the rear of the building in 1998, Joe's Pub replaces some offices and storage areas. An expanded lobby mezzanine and an LED chandelier, displaying text from Shakespeare's plays, date from the 2010s renovation. Since 2012, a lounge called the Library has been located within the mezzanine. The lounge, designed by David Rockwell, includes bookshelves with mementos relating to the Public Theater's previous productions.

==== Upper floors ====
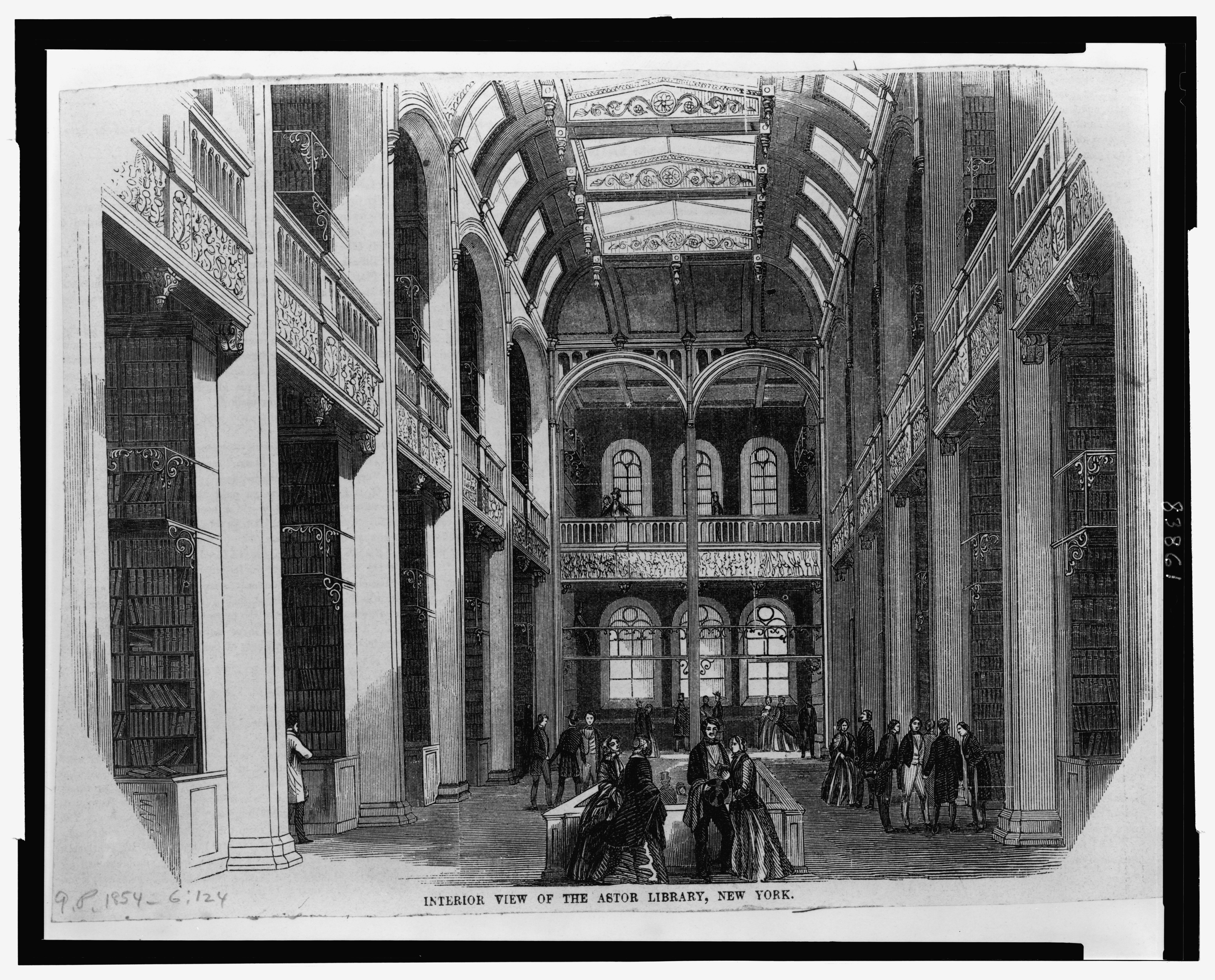
The reading room when the building was in use as a library

As built in 1854, the second floor originally had a double-height reading room, which measured about 100 by 65 feet (30 by 20 m) across. (Note: Other contemporary sources cite the reading room as measuring 150 by 60 feet (46 by 18 m) across, with a ceiling 50 feet (15 m) high.) The ceiling had an iron-framed skylight measuring 54 by 14 feet (16.5 by 4.3 m) across. It was curved at the edges, creating a coved ceiling. The ceiling was supported by 26 cast-iron columns. Behind the columns were galleries measuring 14.5 feet (4.4 m) wide. Much of the space in the galleries was taken up by balconies and book-storage alcoves. The alcoves, similar to those in other libraries such as the old Boston Central Library's Bates Hall, were spread across two levels, separated from the center of the room by railings. There were seven such alcoves on either side of the room, each with a reading table, along with a 2.5-foot-wide (0.76 m) hallway alongside the wall. Originally, the alcoves had capacity for 100,000 volumes. Patrons read their books at the center of the room, with additional natural light coming from windows to the west and east. The original reading room was capable of holding about 500 library patrons.

Additional alcoves, within what is now the center pavilion of the building, were built as part of the 1850s expansion, arranged in groups of six to eight. The center pavilion also had a reading room that was about the same dimensions as the original (south) reading room. There were 28 alcoves in each section of the building, each with 123 shelves; these could fit 200,000 volumes between them. A passage led from the original reading room to the center pavilion. Following the 1880s expansion (which added more alcoves), the central section (the Middle Hall) had a reception room with librarians' desks at the front and a ladies' reading room in the rear. There was also a card catalog and delivery desk in the Middle Hall. The original center room and its alcoves were replaced by the North Hall, within the north pavilion, while the reading room in the south pavilion became the South Hall. Large arches led between the three pavilions, and each hall had stairs leading to the galleries.

When the building was converted for theatrical use, the Middle Hall became the Anspacher Theater, later known as the Barbaralee Theater. The Barbaralee Theater has about 275 seats, which are arranged in steeply raked rows on three sides of the reading room, facing a stage on the fourth side. The theater retains the rooms' columns, its skylight, and the balconies' original white balustrades. The cast-iron columns in the reading room were covered in gold leaf with the theater's construction. The promenade behind the columns is used by performers. The South Hall and the North Hall were retained, with their original arches. These halls are used for dance and music performances, respectively. The building also had an experimental theatre venue with between 150 and 175 seats, in addition to a green room. A venue called Martinson Hall was built on the third floor; it became a 208-seat cabaret venue in 1977. Other venues in the building include the 199-seat LuEsther Hall and the 99-seat Shiva Theater.

== History ==
=== Astor Library ===
==== Development and opening ====
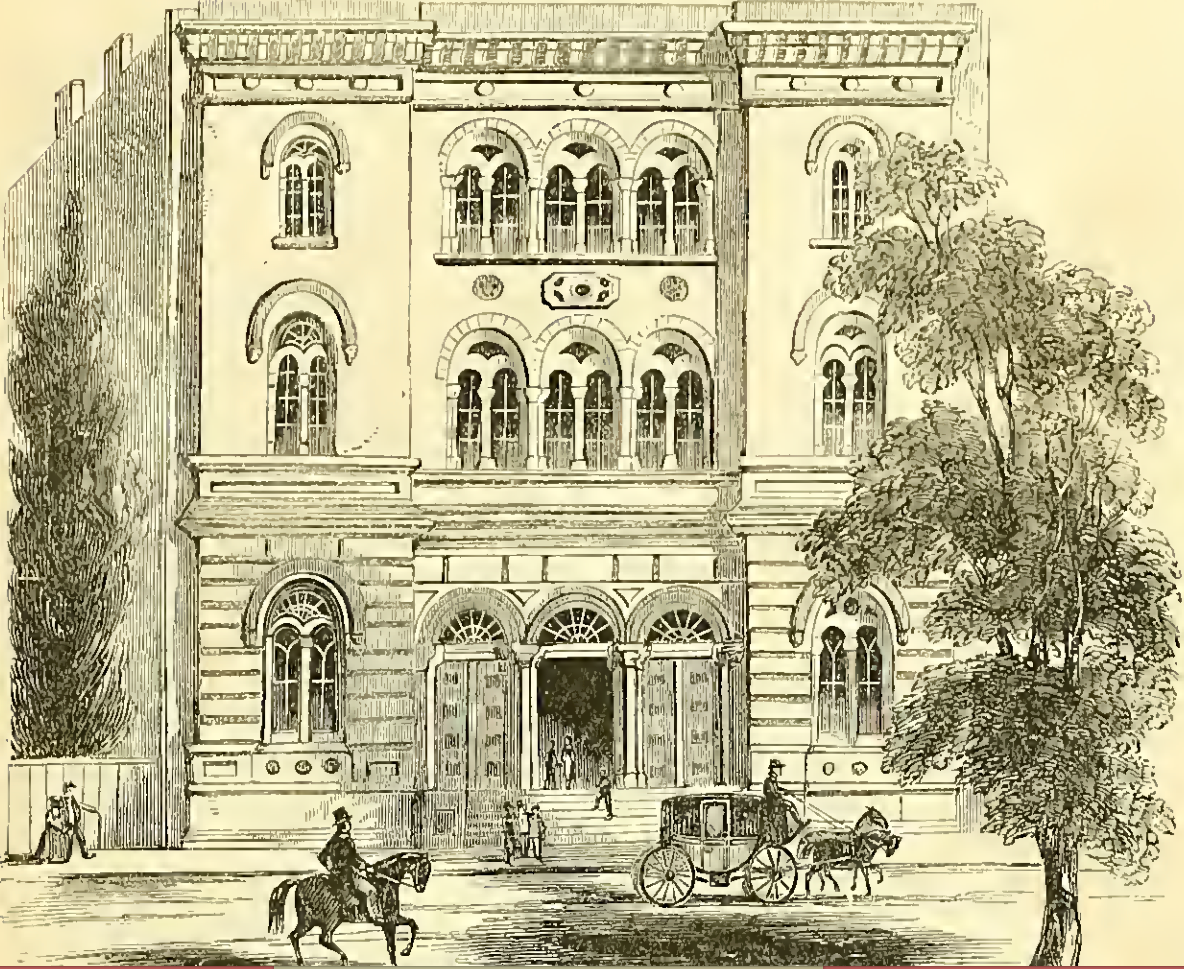
Sketch of the building circa 1852

The Astor Library (Public Theater) Building's original tenant was the Astor Library. The library's founder John Jacob Astor had set aside $350,000 for a future library, (Note: Equivalent to $10.5 million in 2025) later increased to $400,000. (Note: Equivalent to $12.0 million in 2025) In 1838 he directed librarian Joseph Cogswell to use the funds to amass a collection. John Jacob Astor died in 1848. The library's trustees obtained a 65-by-125-foot (20 by 38 m) plot of land on Lafayette Place for the library building that September. This site abutted an Astor family residence and sat between Broadway and the Bowery, two major thoroughfares in the area. Cogswell began acquiring volumes for the collection soon afterward. The library was incorporated in January 1849 and originally was located in a rented house at 32 Bond Street.

On March 28, 1849, the trustees began soliciting plans for the construction of a purpose-built library building, collecting approximately 30 proposals. Alexander Saeltzer was hired to design the building that December. The library trustees set a budget of $75,000, (Note: Equivalent to $2.3 million in 2025) which could not be exceeded. Construction contractors Bogert & Herriot began preliminary work for the building in January 1850. The cornerstone of the building was laid on March 14, 1850, by John Jacob Astor's son William Backhouse Astor Sr. The building was originally supposed to be completed in early 1853, and the library's lease on their existing property was to expire that May. Due to delays in the new building's construction, when the existing lease expired, the books were packed up and stored in the basement of the existing building. Construction was finished by July 1853; the building remained closed for several more months to allow the masonry to dry. It took more than six months to arrange the books on the shelves.

The building opened on January 9, 1854, for observation only, and book usage began on February 1, 1854. The Astor Library was the first large publicly accessible library in the city, open to all people over age 16. The building originally had between 80,000 and 100,000 volumes. (Note: Sources variously cite the library as holding 80,000, 90,000, or 100,000 volumes. Some later sources give a drastically different figure of 200,000 volumes. However, a contemporary source from 1850 stated that the building was initially able to accommodate only 120,000 volumes, and a later source from 1881 said that the building originally had 80,000 volumes but could fit up to 100,000 volumes. The original reading room could fit 100,000 volumes.) The building functioned as a reference library rather than a circulating library, since the nearby New York Mercantile Library was intended to fulfill the function of a circulation library. Access to books was by application only; readers were not admitted into the alcoves to take down books for examination themselves, and books could not be taken from the building for any purpose. The building also closed before sundown because there was originally no artificial illumination; as such, it could not be readily used by the working-class public. The collection focused more on American history, bibliography, and "practical history" than on medical or legal volumes. The books were classified using the system in Brunet's Manuel du Libraire. Partly due to the presence of the Astor Library, bookbinding and publishing firms such as The De Vinne Press and J.J. Little & Co. settled around Lafayette Place. Literary figures such as the editor Richard Watson Gilder moved to the area as well.

==== 1855–1881: Expansions ====
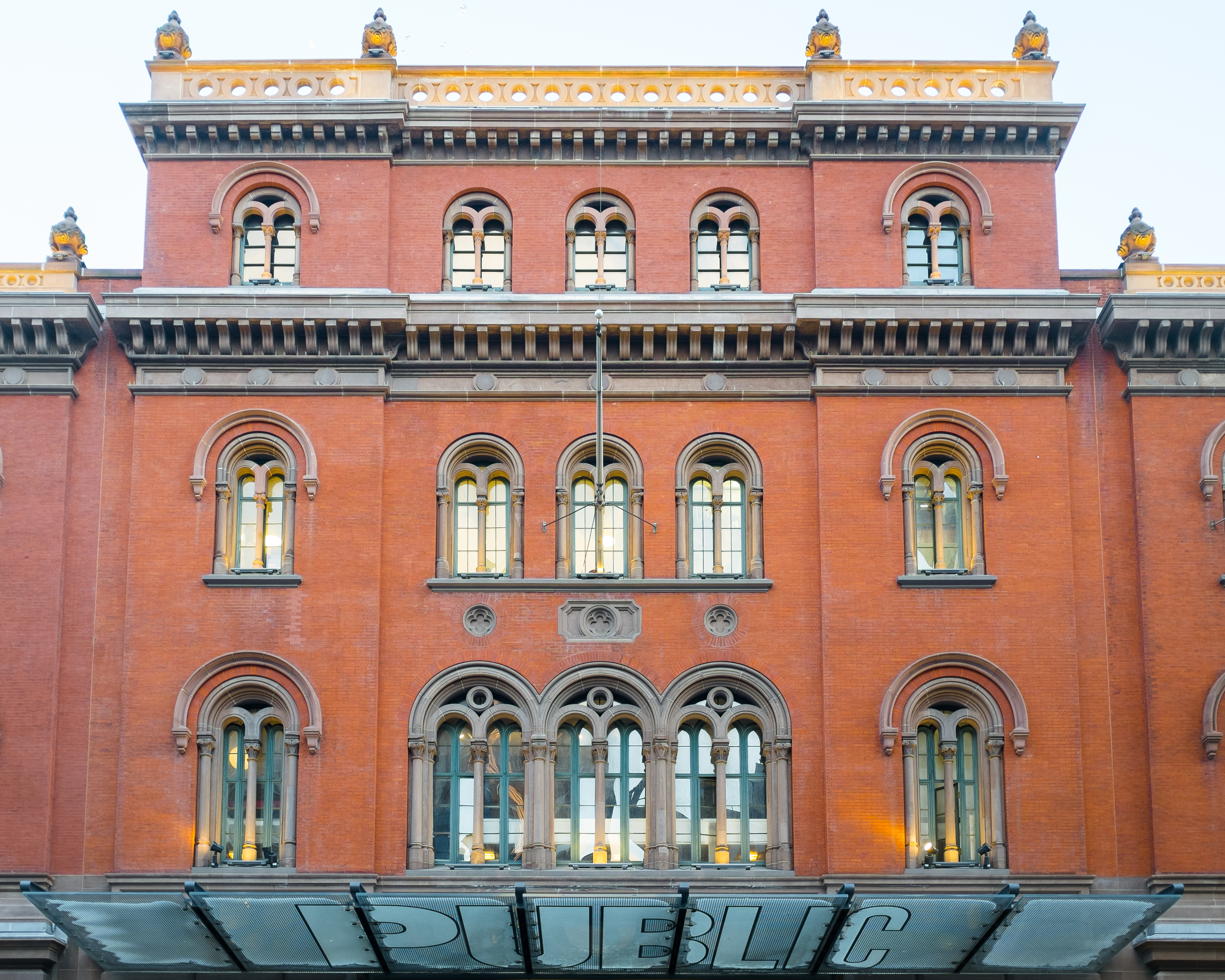
The central pavilion, completed as part of the first expansion

William Astor transferred title to three land lots to the Astor Library's trustees in 1855. (Note: This plot is variously cited as measuring 80 feet (24 m) or 85 feet (26 m) wide. Its depth is variously cited as 100 feet (30 m) or 120 feet (37 m).) Astor also announced plans to construct the building's first expansion on the site. Griffith Thomas was hired to design the first annex in a similar style to the existing structure. Work on the building's annex began in 1856. Additional alcoves were built within the annex, providing space for history and literature volumes, while science and arts volumes remained in the original reading room. The main entrance was also moved to the annex. The building was temporarily closed during mid-1859 to allow the volumes to be moved. The expansion was opened to the public on August 29, 1859, (Note: An alternative opening date of September 1, 1859, is sometimes given.) allowing the building to accommodate 250,000 volumes. At the time, the collection had grown to 110,000. The annex gave the property a total length of 130 feet (40 m) or 150 feet (46 m). The Astor family had spent at least $150,000 to date on construction. (Note: Sources disagree on the total cost: A source from 1859 wrote that the total combined cost of the two sections was $150,000. This is equivalent to $4.3 million in 2025.; A source from 1880 writes that the original building cost $100,000 and the first annex $150,000. This would be equivalent to $2.9 million and $4.3 million in 2025, respectively.)

A card catalog for the collection was added in the 1860s. By later that decade, the original building was known as the south library, and the first annex was known as the north library. The library had approximately 130–140 thousand volumes. It was popular, with tens of thousands of annual readers, (Note: One source from 1866 described the building as having 23,000 readers during the previous year. Another source characterized the building as accommodating 100,000 annual readers.) but was still closed to the public at night, and still did not allow patrons to browse the stacks or check out books. One source said the building was "adapted solely to students" and thus did not lend itself easily to general-purpose research.

William Astor's son John Jacob Astor III donated land for the Astor Library Building in November 1879; this land adjoined the existing building to the north, bringing the site dimensions to about 200 by 100 feet (61 by 30 m). By then, the library had nearly 200,000 volumes. Work on the library's expansion was underway by March 1880. Thomas Stent was hired to design the northern annex, as well as a fourth story above the central (first) annex. The stairway in the original (south) portion of the building was moved to the central section. The second annex had capacity for 120,000 or 150,000 additional volumes. Both the facade and interior were designed in the same manner as the original structure at the south end. A new northern reading room was built to replace the central pavilion's reading room, and volumes from the existing building were transferred to the new north section. The existing building's bibliographic classification system—history and philosophy to the north, sciences and arts to the south—remained largely intact. The expansion cost an estimated $200,000. (Note: Equivalent to $5.7 million in 2025) The building was closed for four months in mid-1881 so the expansion could be completed; the annex opened on October 10, 1881. A small group of library staff continued to rearrange volumes after the annex opened; this work was planned to take several years.

==== 1882–1911 ====
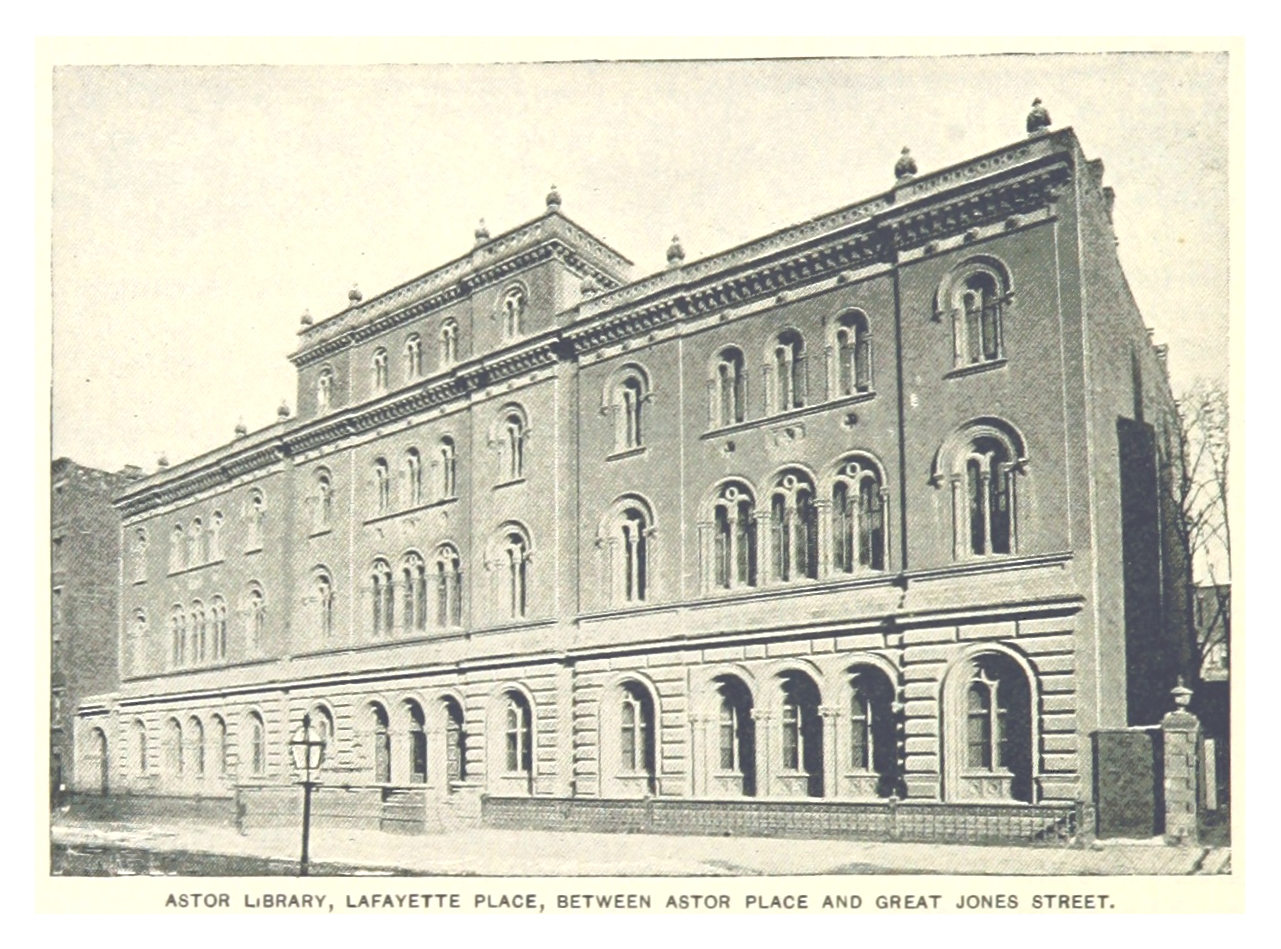
The Astor Library Building in an 1893 guidebook, after the second annex had been finished

The building's limited hours and access restrictions elicited criticism. Students and scholars were also limited access to the alcoves. From c. 1882 onward, patrons were allowed to access the alcoves if they could prove that they could not conduct research in one of the main reading rooms, provided the patron had a letter of recommendation from a respected citizen. The next year, patrons again advocated for the building to be opened at night; this would have entailed moving some books to a dedicated room in the building. In 1884, the trustees voted to keep the building closed at night because there were no gas lamps and because other libraries nearby could serve nighttime patrons. There were also insufficient funds to pay for nighttime operation, and the trustees were concerned that gas lamps would damage the books. The Astor family donated a further land lot south of the existing building in 1888 for a nominal fee of $1. (Note: Equivalent to $28.60 in 2025)

By the mid-1890s, parts of the collection had been moved to the public open stacks. Patrons still needed endorsements from respected citizens to visit the stacks; books could still not be used outside the building; and the library still closed before sundown, between 4 and 5 p.m. depending on the time of year. Although there was theoretically enough money for electric lighting, the trustees wanted to use their funds to expand the collection instead. After the Astor and Lenox libraries merged to form the New York Public Library (NYPL) in 1895, the NYPL received permission to erect its new Main Branch in Midtown Manhattan, which would replace the Astor and Lenox library buildings. The NYPL trustees considered selling the Astor Library Building to raise money for the new building. A bindery had been established in the Astor Library Building by 1899. By then, many of the local literary firms and residents had moved away, replaced by industrial firms. In the early 1900s, the nearby Cooper Union university considered acquiring the Astor Library Building after the NYPL had moved out.

=== Early and mid-20th century ===
==== 1911–1920: Abandonment, sale, and HIAS renovation ====
The NYPL vacated the building on April 15, 1911, in preparation for the opening of its Main Branch. (Note: One source erroneously says the books were moved to the new Main Branch in 1895.) All volumes in the Astor Library Building were then moved to the new library. After the building closed, the area's literary and residential tenants continued moving out. The edifice was little-used for nine years, and the main facade's decorations were cut back in 1912 as part of a project to widen Lafayette Street. In 1914, the social-service group Brotherhood Welfare Association expressed interest in leasing the building. The Astor Library Building was leased in March 1919 by the United States Army's 77th Division as a temporary clubhouse with 450 beds. The club planned a permanent building there in the long run, hiring Warren and Wetmore to design a new structure, but ultimately relocated to 25th Street instead. By December 1919, the building was instead being used as a retail store for the Army.

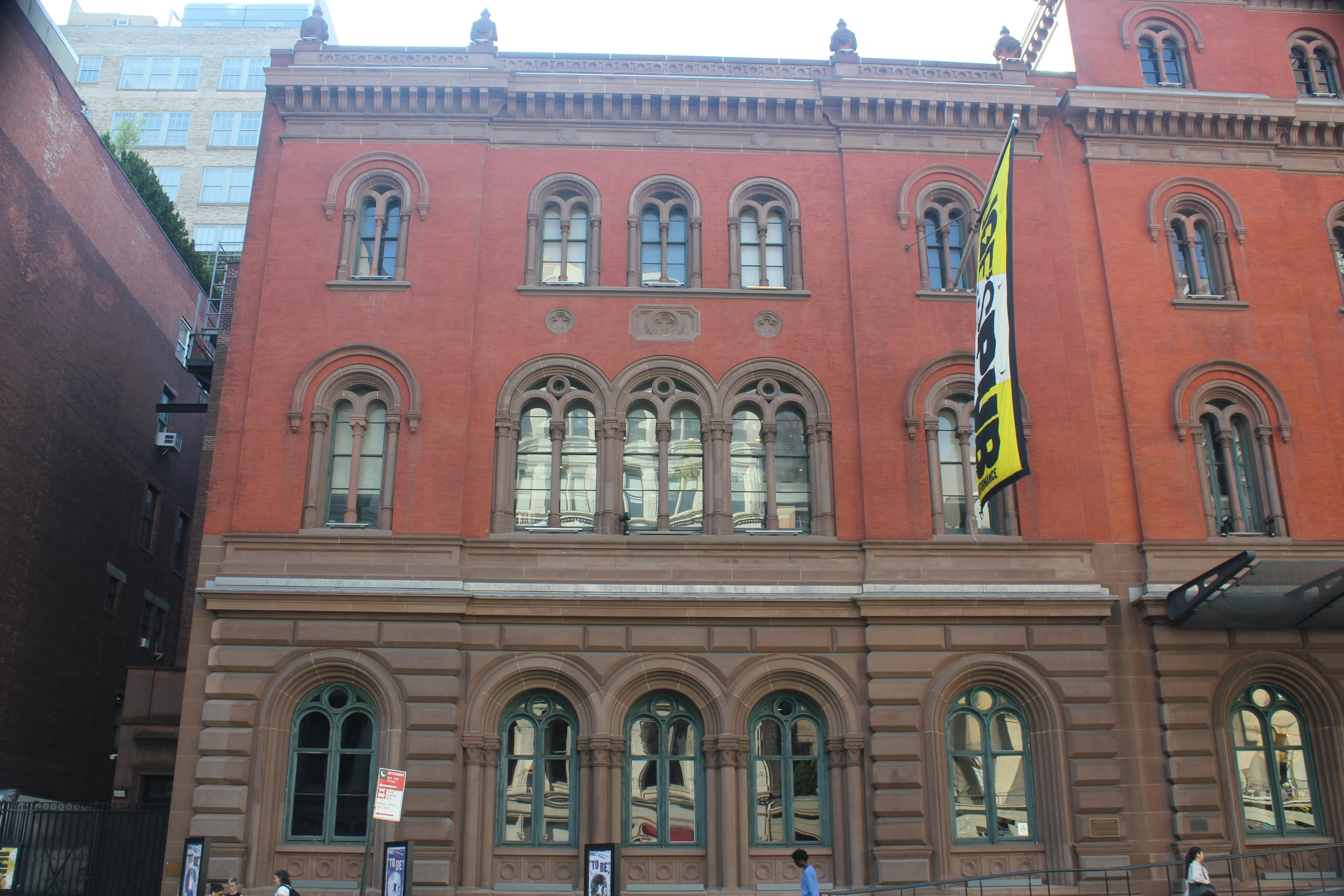
The northernmost pavilion, completed as part of the second expansion

The Hebrew Immigrant Aid Society (HIAS) purchased the building for $325,000 (Note: Equivalent to $4.0 million in 2025) in December 1919, having outgrown their existing building on the Lower East Side. HIAS planned to operate dormitories and a school for prospective citizens at the building, which required that the Army store vacate the property. These changes were estimated at $75,000. (Note: Equivalent to $0.9 million in 2025) After the U.S. government left that May, HIAS immediately began remodeling the structure, hiring Benjamin Levitan to renovate the interiors. The reading room was split up into multiple levels, and the stacks were removed. HIAS launched a fundraising drive for the building in September 1920, at which point 20,000 people had already contributed half the renovation and building costs.

==== 1921–1965: HIAS use ====
The building officially opened on June 5, 1921, with a dedication ceremony featuring remarks by President Warren G. Harding. HIAS used 425 Lafayette Street as an immigrant intake facility for over four decades, during which the building accommodated a quarter-million visitors. HIAS held its annual meetings in the building, and it also hosted events there, such as bazaars, exhibits, and Passover Seder meals. Newly arrived Jewish immigrants in New York City, if not received by a relative already in the United States, were transported to 425 Lafayette Street, where they were assisted and sent off to other cities. By the 1930s, the first floor had an office where prospective immigrants' relatives could provide documents for their family members' journeys, while the second floor had an employment office and several classrooms. The building also included dormitories, a dispensary, a nursery, a synagogue, and kosher kitchens.

The exodus of Jews from Nazi Germany in the 1930s led to increases in HIAS's activities. The building was nicknamed the "door of hope", especially as Nazi Germany's persecution of Jews continued during World War II. After the war, the building continued to house Jewish immigrants and refugees who had no other place to live, particularly Holocaust survivors. In 1948, Nettie Berg and Jacob Lesser donated funds for a children's playroom at 425 Lafayette Street. That year, HIAS set up an office at the building to assist undocumented Jewish immigrants in gaining legal status. The building's other offices included a missing-relative service to help Jews locate long-lost family members. After the United Service for New Americans was merged into HIAS in 1954, the combined organization was headquartered at 425 Lafayette Street. During that decade, the building hosted Egyptian and Hungarian Jewish refugees.

HIAS stayed in the building until 1965. Joseph Papp, leader of the theatrical group New York Shakespeare Festival (later the Public Theater), said that when he first visited the building in the mid-1960s, HIAS was operating two kitchens, a synagogue, and dormitories there. By then, the Astor Library Building was in disuse and faced demolition. HIAS sought to sell the property, which was under consideration as a city landmark. After unsuccessfully attempting to find a buyer who wanted to preserve the building, HIAS decided to sell it to the real-estate developer Lithos Properties by 1965; the buyer planned to replace the Astor Library Building with an apartment block.

=== Public Theater ===
==== 1960s: Preservation and renovation ====
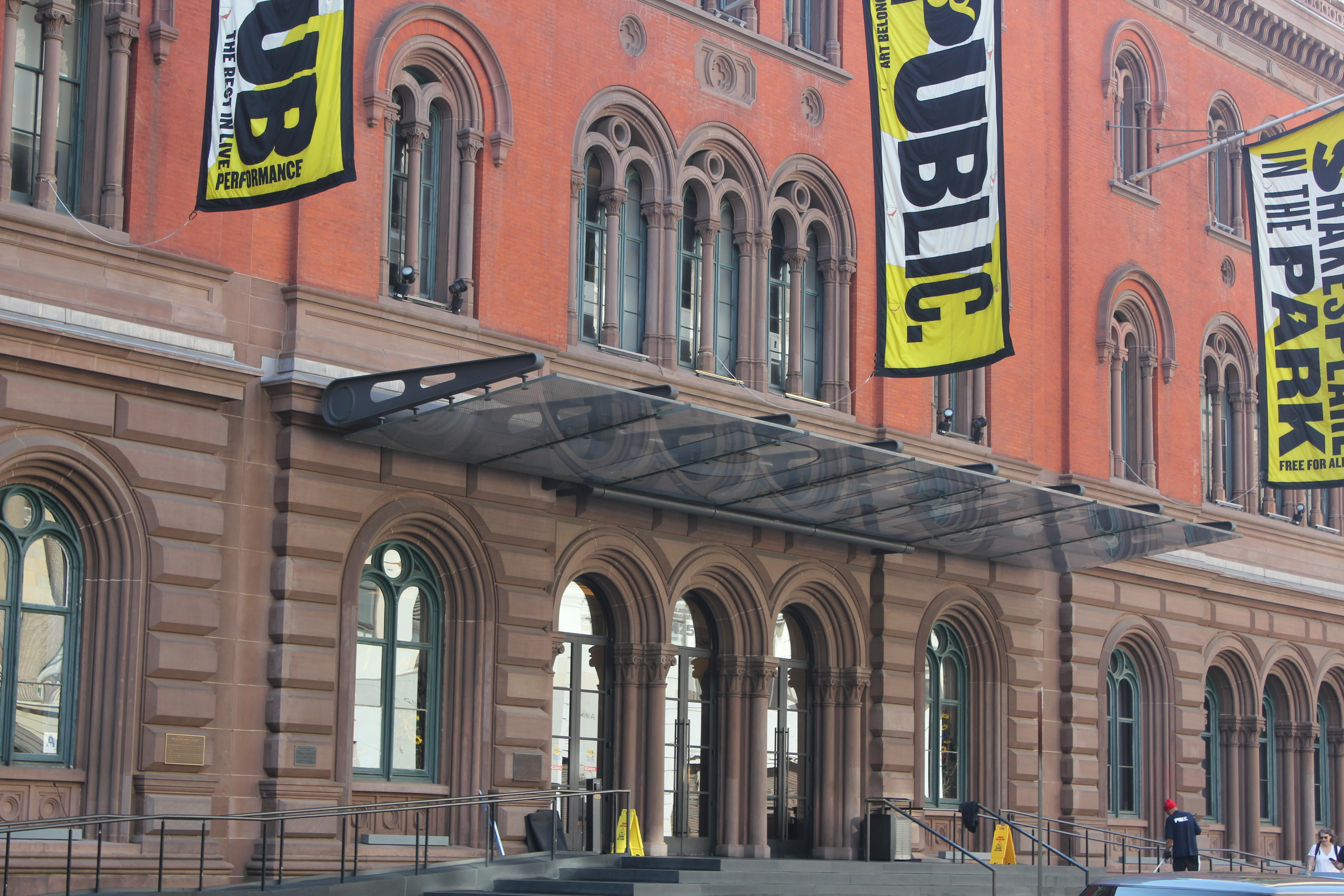
The building's main entrance

The building's sale and proposed demolition came just as Papp was looking for a permanent venue for the Shakespeare Festival. In September 1965, the New York City Landmarks Preservation Commission (LPC) offered the building to the Shakespeare Festival. Sources disagree on whether the LPC offered the building after Papp wrote the agency to ask about abandoned buildings, or whether Papp had come across a picture of the Astor Library Building in The New York Times. Papp and his associate Bernard Gersten went to tour the Astor Library Building, where a caretaker for HIAS gave them a tour of the abandoned building. Papp said the building was in such poor condition, "it looked like there had been a pogrom in the place". Nonetheless, he admired the building's architecture and its large interior spaces, and his grandfather, a Jewish immigrant, had once stayed there. The LPC designated the Astor Library Building as a landmark on October 26, 1965, despite opposition from HIAS. The Astor Library Building was one of the first designations ever made by the LPC, which had gained legal powers to enforce the city's landmark law in early 1965. Although Gerstein said the building would be expensive to renovate and would vibrate frequently due to passing subway trains, Papp decided to buy the building anyway.

The Shakespeare Festival announced in January 1966 that it would buy the building. The group assumed Lithos's contract and paid about $560,000, (Note: Equivalent to $4.2 million in 2025) the same amount Lithos had agreed to pay HIAS. At the time, Lithos had already paid HIAS several thousand dollars. The Shakespeare Festival also planned to spend $1.8 million (Note: Equivalent to $13.6 million in 2025) converting the old library into a facility with an auditorium, classrooms, and other theatrical facilities. Papp was also searching for a donor to help defray the renovation costs, and it planned to rename the Astor Library Building the Shakespeare Building. The Shakespeare Festival committed $475,000 (Note: Equivalent to $3.6 million in 2025) to the restoration after the city government offered to eventually buy the building back from the organization. Shortly after the purchase, a member of the festival's board committed $250,000 for the project, (Note: Equivalent to $3.6 million in 2025) and the Shakespeare Festival hosted a fundraiser for the renovation. Giorgio Cavaglieri was hired to lead the Astor Library Building's renovation. The building's city-landmark designation applied only to the exterior, so theoretically the interior could be gutted and completely renovated. The exterior was modified less drastically; it still bore HIAS's acronym twenty years after Papp's group moved in.

Papp's original plan had called for two auditoriums of 200 and 800 seats each, but these plans would have required demolishing the main reading room, something Papp sought to avoid. To save the reading room, Papp announced in August 1966 that he would instead build a 150-seat auditorium on the first floor and a 300-seat auditorium on the second floor. This delayed the renovation's completion. By late 1966, the lower theater was to be named after major donor Estelle A. Newman; the other theater was subsequently named after Florence Sutro Anspacher. Papp later modified the plans to include a third stage for experimental theatre. The Shakespeare Festival dedicated the structure as the Public Theater on October 10, 1967; the Public Theater Building had been the first building to be adaptively reused under the new landmarks law. The Anspacher Theater was opened on October 30, with a performance of Hair. Because of a lack of funding, some decorations were left unfinished; as late as 1969, the Newman Theater still needed $500,000 in additional funding. (Note: Equivalent to $3.4 million in 2025) Papp moved his office into the building, which also came to encompass four auditoriums. The Public Theater Building's renovation was one of several such projects that helped revitalize the area around Astor Place. Other theaters and restaurants opened in the area after the renovation was completed, and the Public Theater Building became what The Washington Post called "the cultural nucleus of the district".

==== 1970s: City purchase and further changes ====
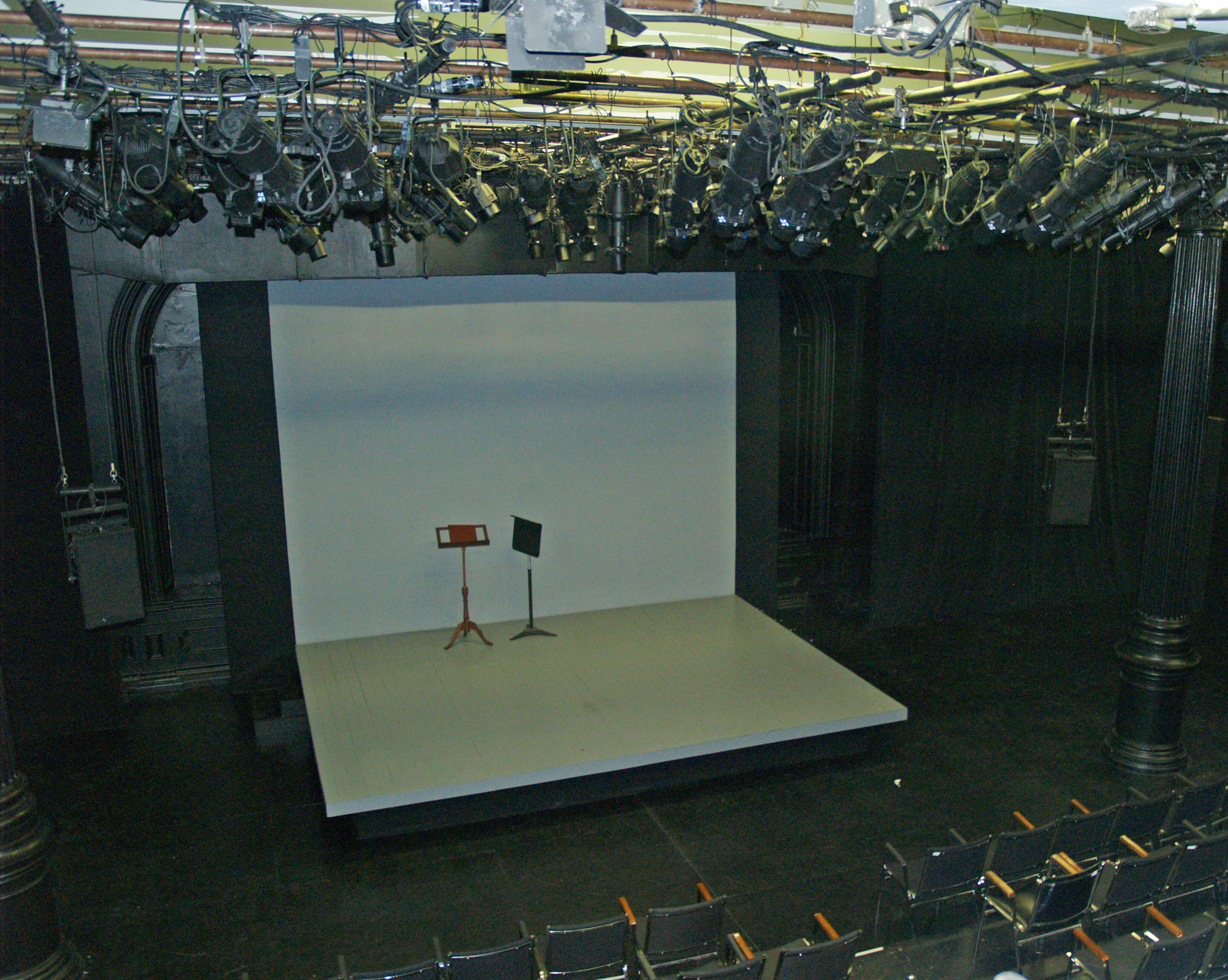
Interior of one of the stages

Papp's primary operation, the free-admission Shakespeare in the Park program, had never been profitable, but the purchase of the Public Theater Building worsened his deficits, as revenue from the Public Theater's ticket sales was insufficient to cover the deficits. After attempting to raise money through other sources such as newspaper advertisements, Papp contacted city parks commissioner August Heckscher II in 1969 and offered to sell the city the building for $3.56 million. (Note: Equivalent to $23.9 million in 2025) By 1970, Papp owed over $400,000 toward the Public Theater Building's renovation. (Note: Equivalent to $2.6 million in 2025) As such, construction contractor Yorke Construction Corporation threatened to place a lien on the property that June. The city proposed taking over the Public Theater Building, allowing the organization to focus on Shakespeare in the Park, and the state offered the city $250,000 (Note: Equivalent to $1.6 million in 2025) in matching funds for the purchase. By then, Papp wanted $5.1 million for the building, (Note: Equivalent to $32.6 million in 2025) but the New York City Board of Estimate initially rejected the offer.

After the building was added to the National Register of Historic Places on December 2, 1970, the proposed purchase became eligible for federal funding. That month, Papp halved his asking price, and a committee headed by theatrical manager Roger L. Stevens was formed to raise money for the building. The organization was still in danger of defaulting on the building's mortgage loan, which came due on January 31, 1971. That March, after reconsidering Papp's offer, the Board of Estimate agreed to pay $2.6 million (Note: Equivalent to $15.8 million in 2025) for the building and to lease it back to the Shakespeare Festival for a nominal fee of $1 annually. (Note: Equivalent to $6.08 in 2025) The leaseback agreement was delayed by bureaucratic city procedures, requiring the Shakespeare Festival to borrow large amounts just to remain operational. In June 1972, the state government signed legislation allowing the leaseback agreement to proceed. The city's purchase of the building helped reduce the organization's financial deficits.

Meanwhile, the Newman Theater opened in 1970, and Anthology Film Archives opened the Invisible Cinema, an auditorium for film screenings, later that year. The film auditorium, occupying the northern section of the ground floor, screened films in repertory. Papp received $250,000 in city funds for the building's renovation in late 1972. By that decade, the Public Theater Building comprised one venue for film screenings and five or six stages for live theatre. (Note: Sources from the 1970s variously cite the Public Theater Building as having five or six stages. Another source from Papp's death in 1991 cites the building as having had five stages.) It hosted a variety of stage productions, including new plays, revivals of classics, and some musicals. Due to space limitations, the Shakespeare Festival had opened additional venues across the street by the mid-1970s. When the Anthology Film Archives moved out around that time, the Shakespeare Festival repurposed the film screening space as the Little Theater. This space hosted events such as experimental theatre workshops and screenings of limited-distribution films. Papp renovated the Public Theater Building's top floor in 1977, converting Martinson Hall into a cabaret venue.

==== 1980s and 1990s ====
In 1984, the Shakespeare Festival renamed one of the live-theater stages after longtime board member Susan Stein Shiva, who had died the previous year. The Shakespeare Festival's costume shop was relocated out of the building across the street by the mid-1980s. During that time, most of the live-theater stages were closed for repairs, leaving the film auditorium and one of the live-theater stages open. The Public Theater's presence in the building continued to attract local businesses. By the end of its second decade as a theater, the Public Theater Building hosted about 300 separate productions. In the late 20th century, the Public Theater made various upgrades to the Public Theater Building. For instance, the North Hall's lower level was rebuilt, and a mezzanine was added to provide more space for backstage functions.

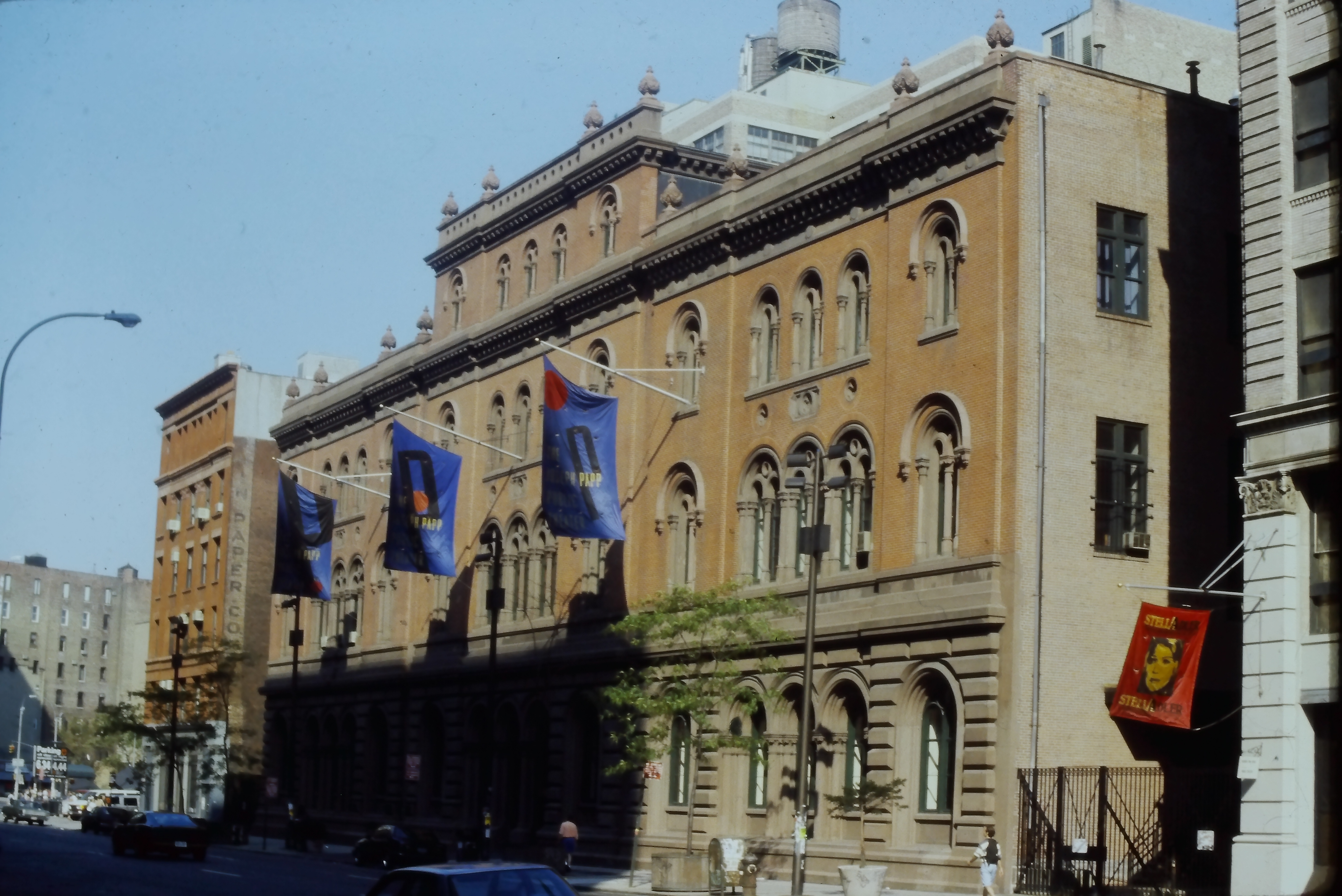
The building in 1993

After Papp's death in 1991, the Public Theater Building was officially renamed the Joseph Papp Public Theater in April 1992. The theatrical organization was still legally the New York Shakespeare Festival, but the Papp and Public names were sometimes used for the organization as well. When he died, Papp had been negotiating a 99-year lease for the building, which was finalized by Mayor David Dinkins in June 1993. That year, Papp's successor George C. Wolfe converted one of the live stages to the LuEsther Lab, an experimentation space closed to the public. Wolfe also sought to raise $50 million for a campaign to renovate the building. By then, the New York Shakespeare Festival had staged almost 400 live theatrical works at the building. Joe's Pub, a small performance space and dining establishment, opened at the building in October 1998. The renovation of Joe's Pub cost around $2 million. (Note: The project is variously cited as costing $1.7 million or $2.35 million.) The next year, the Public Theater Building was designated by the LPC as part of the NoHo Historic District.

==== 2000s to present ====
By the early 21st century, the Public Theater Building was one of several theaters in NoHo, along with the Gene Frankel Theater, Lynn Redgrave Theater, and Astor Place Theatre. The organization had also raised $20 million toward the building's renovation by 2000. Under the directorship of Mara Manus between 2002 and 2007, the Public Theater hosted an increasing number of programs, which increased patronage at the Public Theater Building. By the mid-2000s, the Public Theater Building had five stages in addition to Joe's Pub; by then, the organization itself had formally become the Public Theater (or colloquially the Public). When Manus resigned in 2008, the Public was planning to raise $6 million for renovations at the building. The city government had agreed to give another $19 million for the renovation, later increased to $22 million. In 2009, the Public commenced a campaign to raise funds for the building's renovation. This project marked the Public Theater Building's first major modifications since the organization had moved in four decades prior. Ennead Architects was hired to design the renovation. Since the building was a city landmark, the LPC, the community board representing the area, and the New York City Department of Transportation were required to review the plans.

A groundbreaking ceremony for the project occurred on March 9, 2010, attended by figures such as Liev Schreiber and Philip Seymour Hoffman. The project involved restoring the exterior; adding a balcony, coat check, and restrooms; and expanding and restoring the lobby. A canopy and stoop were added outside the entrance. A mezzanine was added to the lobby, allowing the space to accommodate up to 690 patrons, and the Library cafe was added to the mezzanine. The project included a direct connection to Joe's Pub; this required the pub to be closed for three months of renovations in mid-2011. The renovation contractors also upgraded the mechanical systems, aiming to earn a LEED green building certification for the building. During the project, the renovation campaign received another $2 million from the Ford Foundation and part of a $4 million gift from the Spitzer Trust (founded by the parents of former Governor Eliot Spitzer). The Public Theater Building reopened on October 4, 2012, with attendees such as Schreiber, Mandy Patinkin, Vanessa Redgrave, and Mayor Michael Bloomberg. The project had cost $40 million, around two-thirds of which came from city funds.

Joe's Pub, which had not been extensively modified during the 2010s renovation, received a new audiovisual system in 2014. In 2026, after Barbaralee Diamonstein-Spielvogel's foundation donated funds for a renovation of the Anspacher Theater, that stage was renamed the Barbaralee Theater.

== Reception ==
=== 19th and mid-20th centuries ===
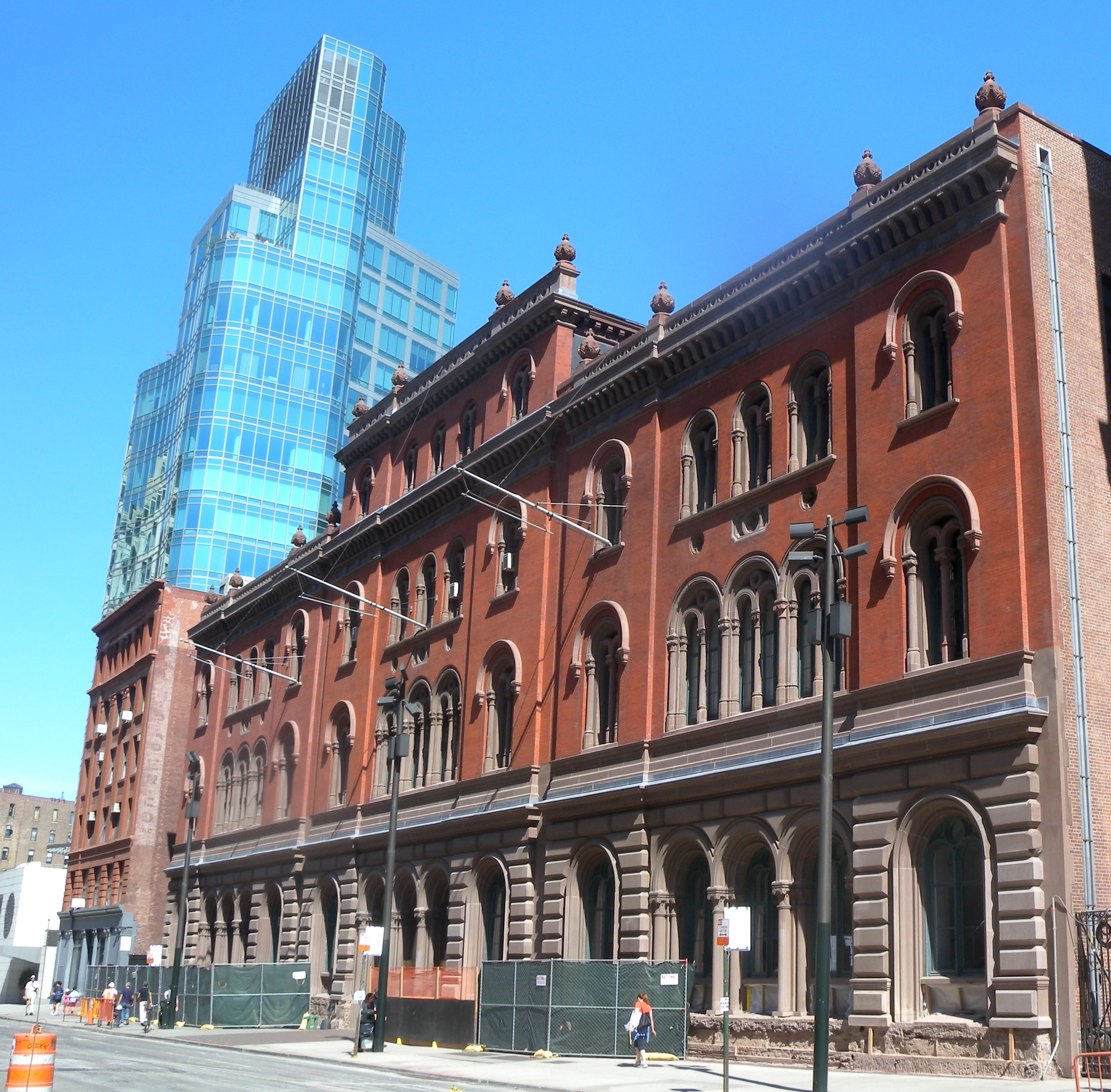
View of the Astor Library (Public Theater) Building toward the north

When the building opened in 1854, the New York Observer and Chronicle wrote that it was "simple in style, but admirably adapted to the purpose for which it was designed", and the New-York Tribune also commented that the building was "inornately decorated". The New York Times wrote that the building was a "noble monument to the rich old gentleman whose name it bears". Contemporary sources also praised the interior as well-organized. A writer for The United States Magazine said the original building's relatively small size put it at a disadvantage but that, even so, "the architect has made the most of his prescribed front elevation". A writer for the Chicago Press and Tribune said in 1860 that the building held valuable items inside despite its "singularly plain and undemonstrative" exterior.

A writer for the Democrat and Chronicle said in 1882 that the building's alcoves and high ceilings "sometimes seem like a literary prison" despite the "delightful reading" going on there. The same year, amid criticism of the Astor Library's shortcomings, Century magazine wrote that the library was suited for its intended audience but lamented that the building was not fireproof or well-lit. Another writer called the building "one of the few lions of the city that do not disappoint", and The New York Times wrote that it was still a point of interest for the majority of the area's literary workers. By the late 1890s, the Times wrote that the building was "out of joint with its surroundings".

The New York Herald Tribune wrote in 1940 that, when the Astor Library Building had opened, the site was described as "having a refined and classic air". Mark Wischnitzer wrote in 1957 that, despite the uninviting appearance of the building, inside were "human beings, whose perspective for happiness was rejuvenated by the men and women of HIAS". Newsweek magazine retrospectively called the building "one of New York's architectural glories".

=== Late 20th century to present ===
When the building was sold to the Shakespeare Festival in 1966, architectural writer Ada Louise Huxtable described its preservation as "the miracle on Lafayette Street". The renovation was widely praised; Huxtable wrote that observers could "call [the building] anything, but call it a success", and historian Gerard Wolfe wrote that the building "is an ideal example of adaptive reuse". Newsday writer Allan Wallach said in 1971 that the building was "redolent of a more leisurely era" and that its "Victorian charm" contrasted with the aggressive personality of Papp, its savior. Oskar Eustis, a later artistic director of the Public Theater, wrote that the building's history "dovetails with what Joe decided to do with it", saying that the Astor Library Building's original purpose was particularly prescient because Papp, a child of immigrants, had learned English at a public library.

Retrospectively, Wolfe wrote in 1994 that the Public Theater Building was a "lovely Italian Renaissance palazzo" with an intact entrance and lobby, even though the interiors had largely been split up into theaters. Francis Morrone wrote in 2002 that it was an "excellent example of the Rundbogenstil" because the style was appropriate for the small lot size, contrasting with the large parcel occupied by the New York Public Library Main Branch, which allowed that building to have a more monumental design.

== See also ==
- List of New York City Designated Landmarks in Manhattan below 14th Street
- National Register of Historic Places listings in Manhattan below 14th Street
