= Angel Orensanz =

Spanish sculptor and painter

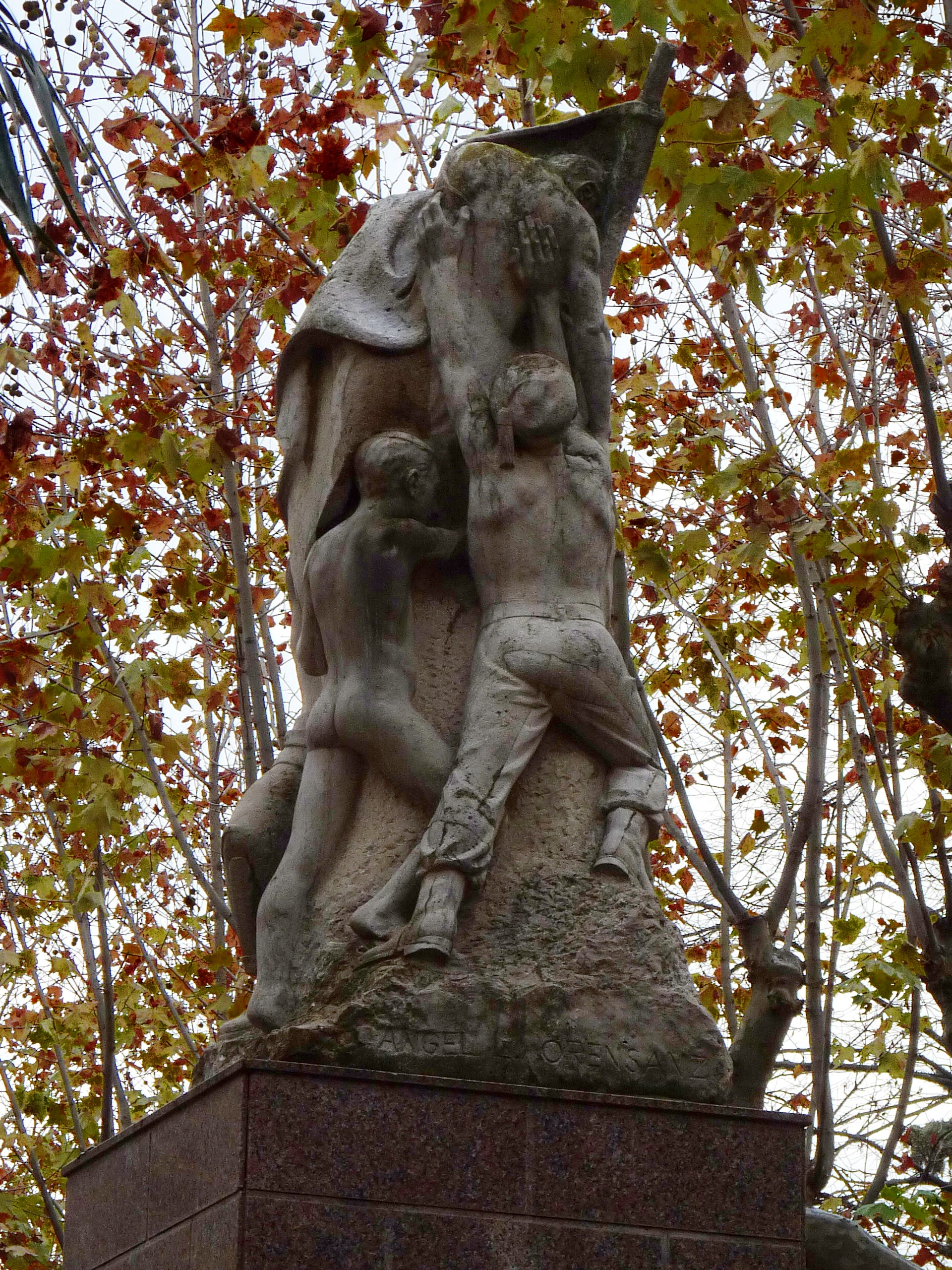
Naturaleza in the Parque Miguel Servet in Huesca

Angel Orensanz (born 1940 in Huesca) is a Spanish sculptor and painter who has lived in New York City since 1986.

He established the Angel Orensanz Foundation Center for the Arts, on the Lower East Side of Manhattan, in 1986.

Work by Angel Orensanz exists in several locations on the Barcelona Metro, including Passeig de Gràcia station and Zona Universitària station.
