= Leon Kamaiky =

American publisher

- Born: April 13, 1864
- Died: October 28, 1928 (aged 64)

Leon Kamaiky (April 13, 1864 – October 28, 1928) was a Lithuanian-born Jewish-American newspaper owner and publisher.

== Life ==
Kamaiky was born on April 13, 1864, in Vilkoviskas, Russia on April 13, 1864, the son of Behr Kamaiky and Zippora Urysohn. He immigrated to America in 1885, where he attended evening high schools in New York City, New York, and worked in merchandise from 1886 to 1888.

The son of a rabbi, Kamaiky studied for some time in the Jewish Theological Seminary of America. In 1889, he became manager of the New York Jewish Daily News, the first Yiddish daily newspaper in America. The paper was founded three years beforehand by his father-in-law Kasriel Hirsch Sarasohn. He eventually became Sarasohn's partner, and after Sarasohn's death in 1905 he became the paper's owner. By then, he was also vice-president of the corporation that published the Jewish Morning Journal. When the Morning Journal merged with the Daily News in 1928, he remained vice-president of the corporation that published the paper.

In 1914, Kamaiky organized the Central Relief Committee, which collected over fourteen million dollars through Orthodox communities. In 1920, he travelled to Europe on behalf of stranded Russian and Polish refugees and organized transportation facilities for emigres. He was a director of Yeshivah Isaac Elchanan and the Zionist organization Mizrachi, and a member of Chevra Shatz (East Side Cultural Society), the Order Brith Abraham, the American Jewish Congress, the American Jewish Committee, and the Federation of Jewish Philanthropic Societies of New York City. He was also a founder and vice-president of the Hebrew Sheltering and Immigrant Aid Society of America.

Kamaiky attended the Congregation Kehilath Jeshurun. His first wife Rebecca Sarasohn was the daughter of his former partner Kasriel Sarasohn. He married his second wife Selma Rokeach in 1901, and their children were Israel, Mrs. Rebecca Schur, and Mrs. Miriam Lurie.

Kamaiky died of heart failure in the Watkins Glen Sanatorium in Watkins Glen on October 28, 1928. His funeral took place in Congregation Kehilath Jeshurun, where prominent Orthodox leaders (including Rabbi Moses S. Margolies) paid tribute to him. He was buried in Mount Carmel Cemetery.
