= Alexander Saeltzer =

German-American architect

Coordinates: 40°44′16″N 73°59′50″W

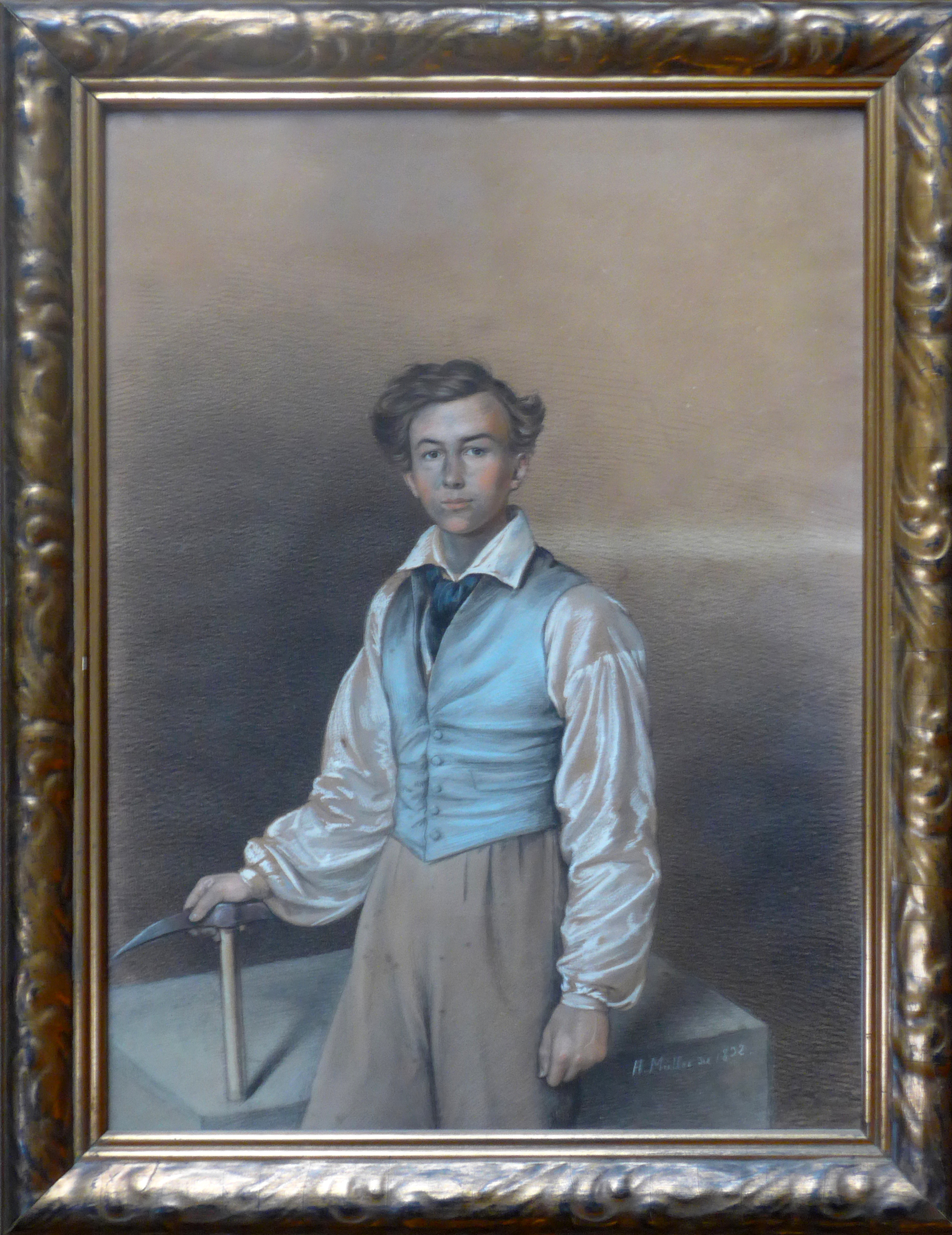
Alexander Saeltzer, about 18 years old, as carpenter-journeyman.

Alexander Saeltzer (31 July 1814 Eisenach, of Saxe-Weimar-Eisenach, in the then German Confederation (Germany)— 23 September 1883 New York City, U.S.A.) was a German-American architect. Later journeyed across the Atlantic Ocean to the Americas and was active in the United States in New York City during the 1850s and 1860s, before the American Civil War (1861-1865). His work includes the prominent Anshe Chesed Synagogue (now the Angel Orensanz Center), the Academy of Music (New York City), the Theatre Francais (New York), the Duncan, Sherman & Company building and the South Wing of the Romanesque revival style Astor Library Building at 425 Lafayette Street in Manhattan, built between 1853 and 1881, to be later used as the Astor Library (which later merged with the Tilden and Lenox collections in 1895, to become the current New York Public Library).

Back in Europe, his father, Wilhelm Sältzer, was a brickyard owner, also an architect, and a member of the Grand Duke council of the grand duchy of Saxe-Weimar-Eisenach in the former Holy Roman Empire (c. A.D. 962-1806), then later the German Confederation of Central Europe to 1867. He also worked as the construction manager in the reconstruction / restoration of the famous Wartburg medieval castle, where Protestant / Evangelical Lutheranism reformer priest / theologian Martin Luther (1483-1546), was temporarily exiled and hidden during 1521-1522 in the 16th century era of the Protestant Reformation religious movement.

Alexander Saeltzer was born in Eisenach. He studied at the Berlin Bauakademie, in Berlin, then the royal capital city of the Kingdom of Prussia. and was a pupil of Karl Friedrich Schinkel. After graduating from the Bauakademie, moved to journey across the Atlantic to the U.S. from Berlin.

== Synagogue ==
Saeltzer was engaged in February 1849 to design the synagogue at 172 Norfolk Street in an area of New York City on the Lower East Side of Manhattan island known as kleine Deutschland (Little Germany). The synagogue's Gothic Revival style was inspired by the famous medieval Cologne Cathedral in Cologne, and the Friedrichwerdesche Kirche in Berlin. According to a 1987 report by the New York City Landmarks Preservation Commission, while Gothic architecture and its several variations is closely associated with Christianity (both the Roman Catholic Church and Protestant / Evangelical Lutheran / Reformed churches), it had also become popular with synagogues as Jewish temples / synagogues and congregations had taken over old Christian church buildings and become accustomed to the building style, and viewed it as just as appropriate for their religious worship and education with some minor modifications as any other architectural style.

Debuted with great celebration, but the layout / arrangement of the list of the Ten Commandments and the use of stained glass in the synagogue later caused some controversy within the congregation.

== Academy of Music ==
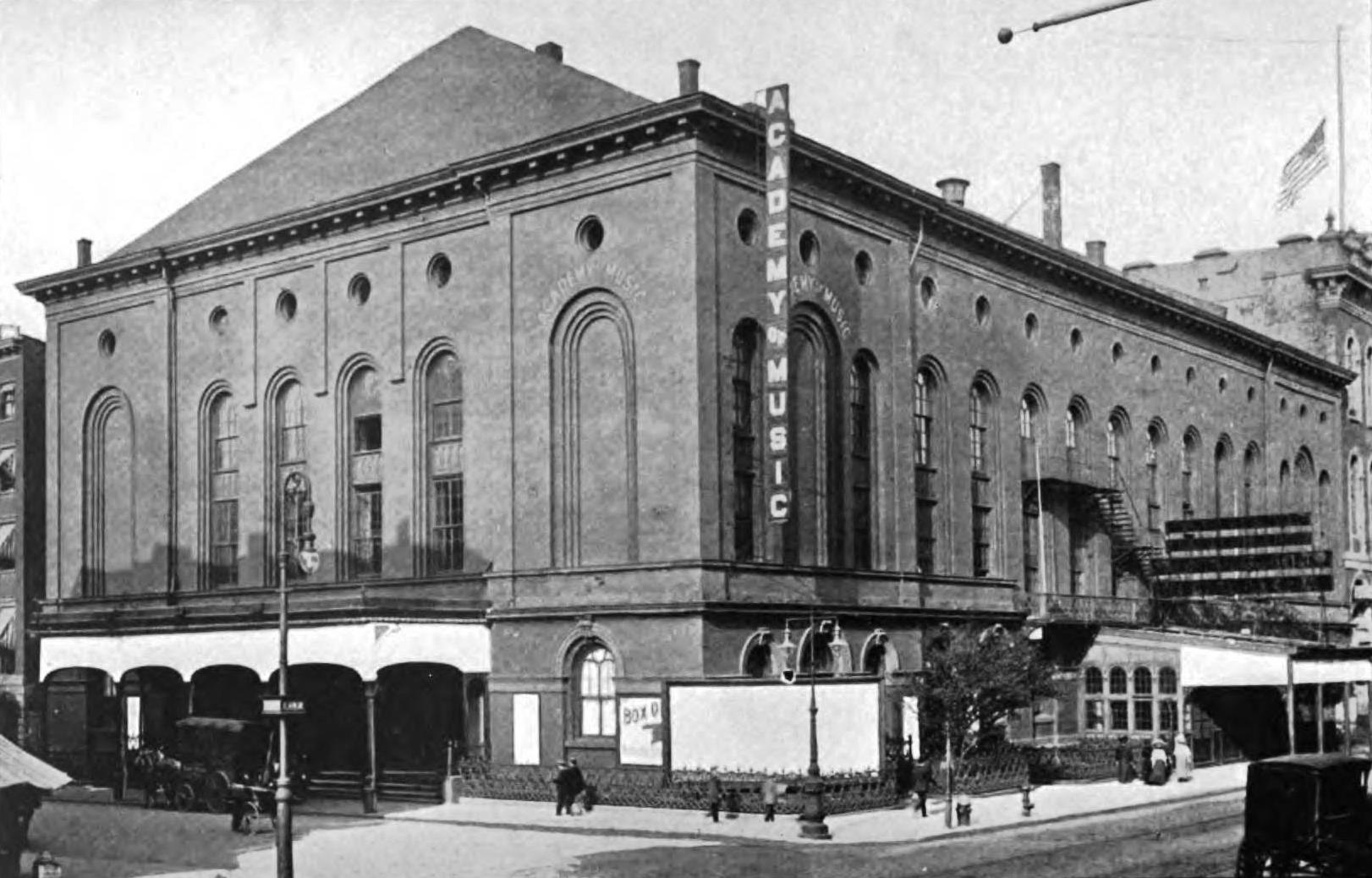
Academy of Music, (Manhattan, New York City), c.1909

It was the demise of the old Astor Opera House (of 1847-1890 on Lafayette Street, between Astor Place and Eighth Avenue), that spurred New York's wealthy and socially elite to build a new opera house in what was then the more genteel neighborhood of Union Square further north up Manhattan island. Efforts were led by Moses H. Grinnell (1803-1877), who formed a corporation in 1852 to fund the construction of the building. Shares were sold at $1,000 each to raise a total of $200,000. When finished, the building – who was designing the Astor Library Building at about the same time, and had previously designed the Anshe Chesed Synagogue – was the world's largest opera venue with seats for an audience of four thousand arranged on five levels (orchestra, parquette, balcony and first, second and third tiers / balconies) and an interior height from floor to rotunda roof / dome of 80 feet (24 m). It had a plush luxurious interior, and private boxes in the orchestra level, but, perhaps due to local daily newspaper editorials questioning the project's republican and common man values, was consciously somewhat less "aristocratized" / upscaled then the previous Astor Opera House had been – there, general admissions were relegated to the benches of a "cockloft" reachable only by a narrow stairway, and otherwise isolated from the gentry below, while in the new theatre many of the regular seats were relatively inexpensive. The stage's proscenium opening was 48 feet (15 m), with an additional 35 feet (11 m) in the wings, and a depth of 70 feet (21 m) from the footlights to the back wall. The height of the proscenium opening was 30 feet (9.1 m).

The acoustics were lauded, but seating arrangement and adequate views came in for criticism.

== Astor Library ==
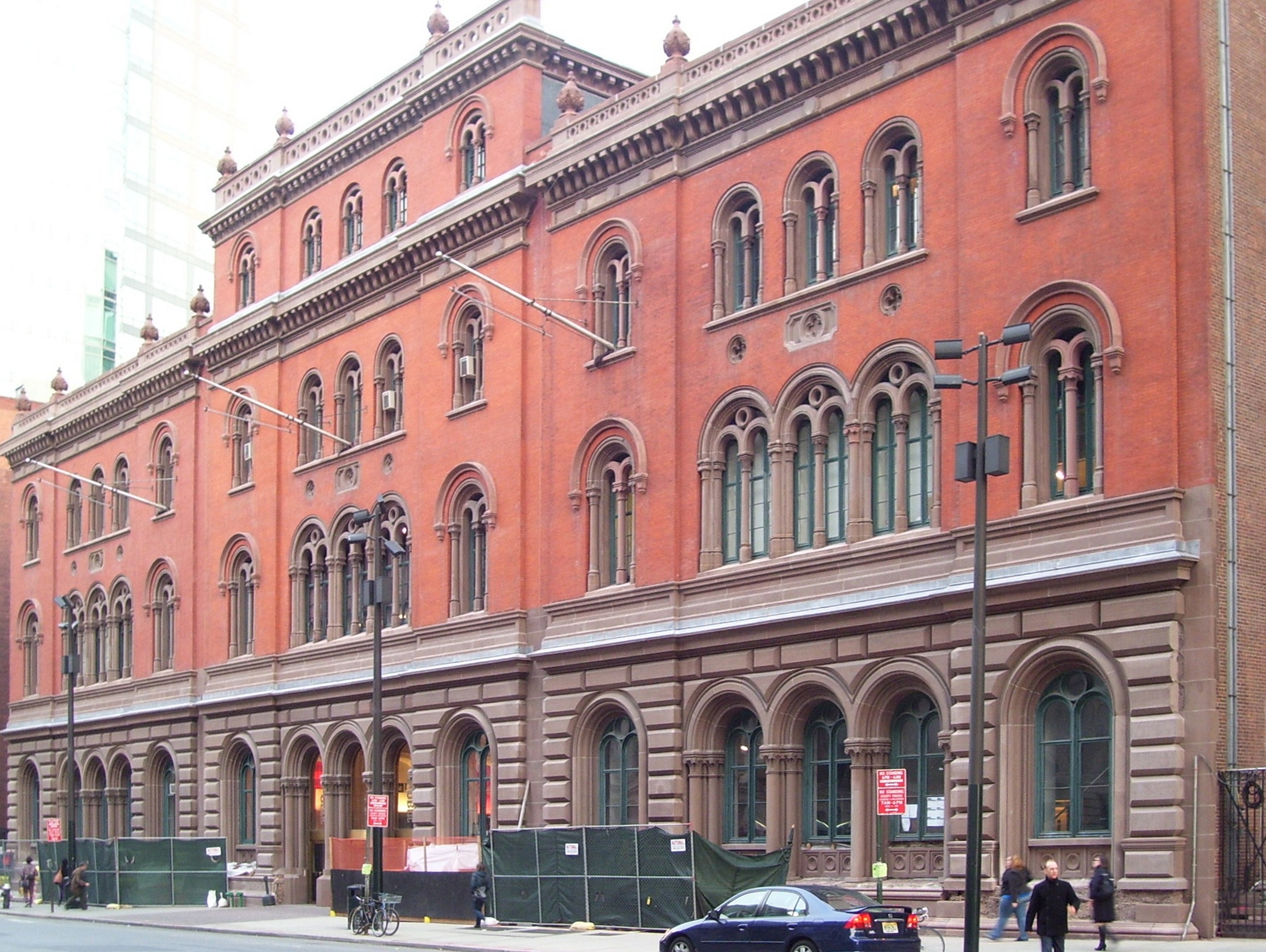
Astor Library Building, including later additions by other architects

Saeltzer won the competition to build the Astor Library Building and designed it in Rundbogenstil style, then the prevailing style for public building in Germany. Funding was provided by William B. Astor, son of the Astor Library's founder, John Jacob Astor. Astor funded two expansions of the building toward Astor Place by Griffith Thomas from 1856 to 1869 and Thomas Stent from 1879 to 1881. Both large expansions followed Saeltzer's original design making it difficult for an observer to detect that the edifice was built in three stages.

In 1920, the Hebrew Immigrant Aid Society purchased the building. By 1965 it was in disuse and faced demolition. The Public Theater, then the New York Shakespeare Festival, persuaded the city to purchase it for use as a theater. It was converted for theater use by Giorgio Cavaglieri between 1967 and 1976.

The building is a New York City Landmark, designated in 1965. It was one of the first buildings to be recognized as such by the newly formed Landmarks Preservation Commission of New York City, thanks to Joseph Papp's perseverance. In 2009, The Public began its “Going Public” campaign to raise funds for a major renovation of the historic building. Groundbreaking for the $35 million renovation occurred on March 9, 2010, with notables such as Liev Schreiber and Philip Seymour Hoffman in attendance. Plans include a renovation of Joe's Pub; the Pub went on a three-month hiatus during the summer of 2011 to allow for construction.

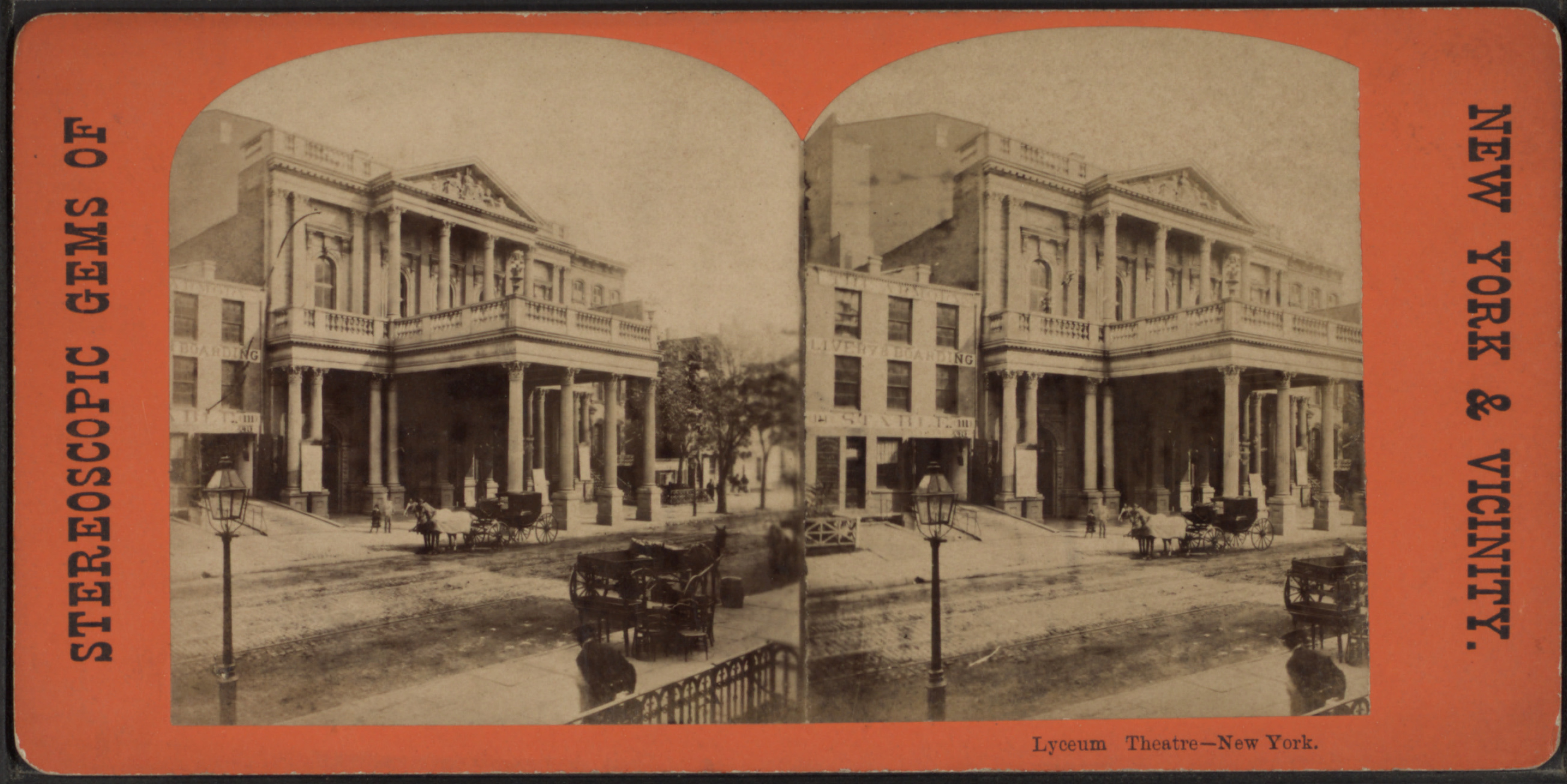
Stereoscopic view of Lyceum Theatre (14th Street Theatre) c.1871

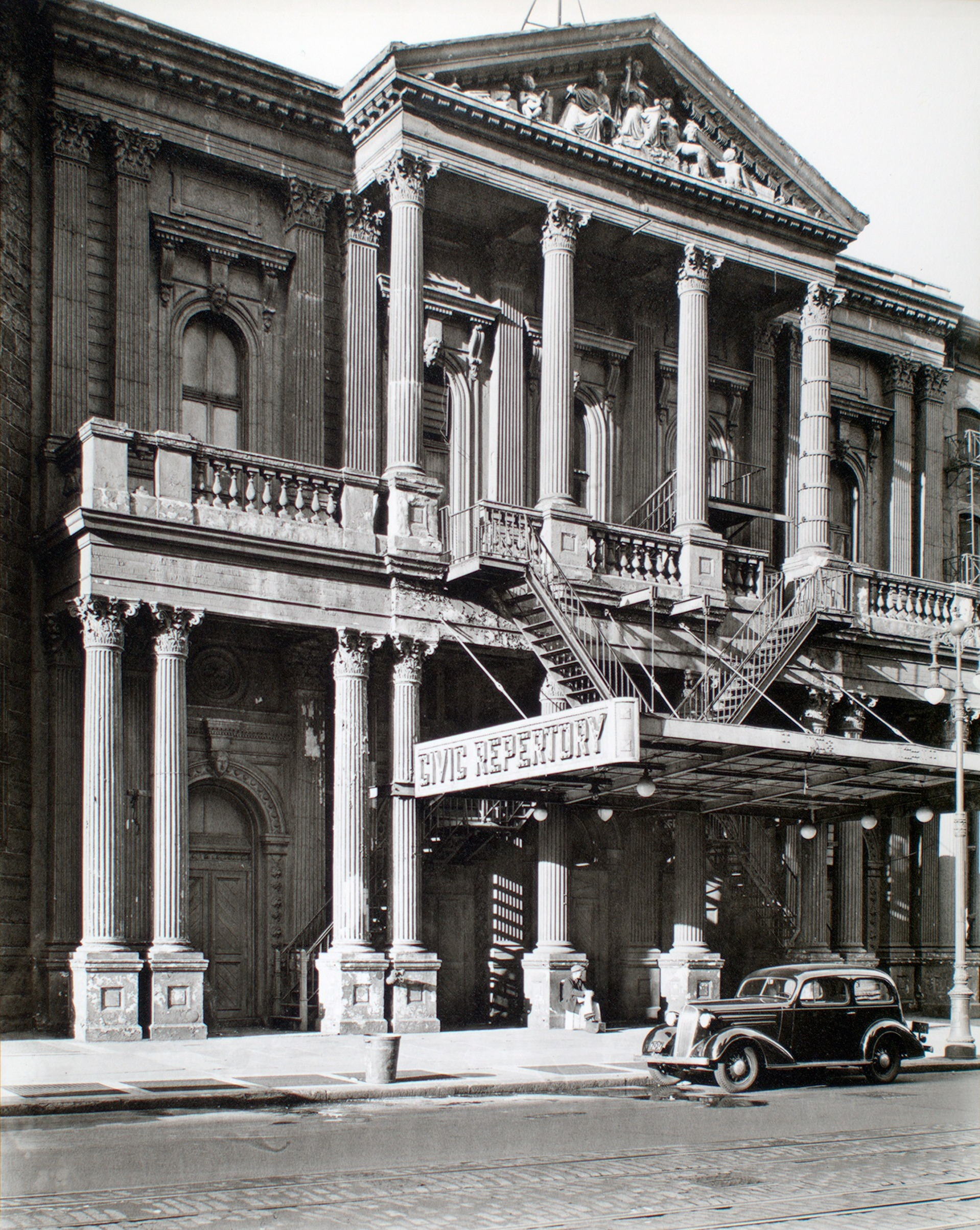
The Repertory Theatre (Fourteenth Street Theatre) in 1936 with added fire escapes, photographed by Berenice Abbott

== 14th Street Theatre ==
The Fourteenth Street Theatre was a New York City theatre located at 107 West 14th Street just west of Sixth Avenue. as a home for French language dramas and opera.

It opened in 1866 as the Theatre Francais and was renamed the Lyceum in 1871. When J.H. Haverly took it over in 1879, he had renamed it Haverly's 14th Street Theatre. By the mid-1880s, it had become simply the Fourteenth Street Theatre. By the mid-1910s it was being used as a movie theatre, until actress Eva Le Gallienne turned it into the Civic Repertory Theater in 1926. She mounted a number of successful productions, but the Great Depression ended that venture in 1934. The building was demolished in 1938 or 1948.

== Works ==
Saeltzer was contracted to design the synagogue in 1849. He later designed the Astor Library (now The Public Theater) (1851) and the Academy of Music on Astor Place in 1854. In 1866 he designed the Theatre Francais (New York).

- Duncan, Sherman & Company building at 11 Pine Street on the corner of Nassau. Saeltzer used iron in the building and disguised it as stone using scagliola.

== Bibliography ==
- Treatise on Acoustics in connection with Ventilation (advertised in Limes Hydraulic Cement and Mortars by Q. A. Gillmore)
