= Hirsch Bernstein =

Pioneer of the Yiddish and Hebrew press in the United States

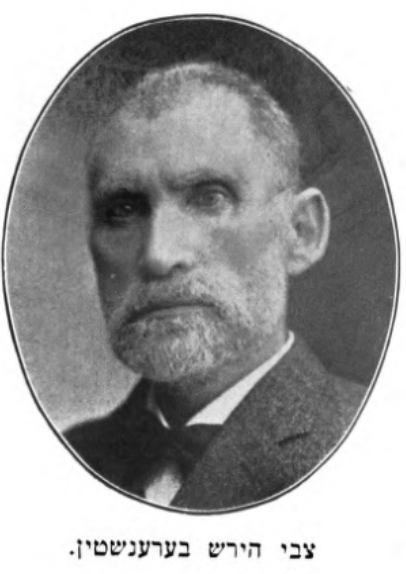
- Born: Zvi Hirsch Bernstein; March 25, 1846; Vladislavov, Augustów Governorate, Congress Poland
- Died: August 6, 1907 (aged 61); Tannersville, New York
- Relatives: Herman Bernstein (nephew)
- Writing career
- Language: Hebrew, Yiddish

Zvi Hirsch Bernstein (Yiddish: צבי הירש בערענשטין; March 25, 1846 – August 6, 1907) was a Russian-American editor and publisher. He was the founder of the first Yiddish and the first Hebrew periodicals in the United States.

== Biography ==
Hirsch Bernstein was born in Vladislavov (Neustadt-Schirwindt), then part of the Russian Empire. He received a traditional Jewish education and became fluent in written Hebrew. He emigrated to the United States in 1870, settling in New York City.

That same year, he launched Di Post, the first Yiddish-language periodical in the United States, using Yiddish type imported from Vilna and Vienna. The publication lasted only six months. Also in 1870, Bernstein founded Ha-Tzofeh be-Eretz ha-Ḥadashah ('The Observer in the New Land'), the first Hebrew-language publication in the United States, which was published weekly for five years.

Bernstein was a frequent contributor to prominent European Hebrew periodicals such as Ha-Maggid, Ha-Lebanon, and Ha-Karmel. Alongside Ch. G. Vidaver, he was among the earliest regular American correspondents to these publications.

Bernstein later became a successful businessman in New York and a patron of the Yiddish theatre. He died in 1907 at the Fairmount Hotel in Tannersville, New York, in the Catskill Mountains.
