= Ansche Chesed =

Synagogue in Manhattan, New York

- Location in the Upper West Side of Manhattan

Religion
- Affiliation: Conservative Judaism
- Ecclesiastical or organisational status: Synagogue
- Leadership: Rabbi Jeremy Kalmanofsky
- Status: Active

Location
- Location: West End Avenue and 100th Street, Upper West Side, Manhattan, New York City, New York
- Country: United States
- Coordinates: 40°47′52.2″N 73°58′15.4″W

Architecture
- Architect: Edward I. Shire
- Type: Synagogue
- Style: Byzantine Revival
- Established: 1828 (as a congregation)
- Completed: 1928 (current location)
- Construction cost: $1.3 million
- Capacity: 1,600 worshippers

Ansche Chesed is a Conservative Jewish congregation and synagogue located at West End Avenue and 100th Street on the Upper West Side of Manhattan in New York City, New York, United States.

== History ==
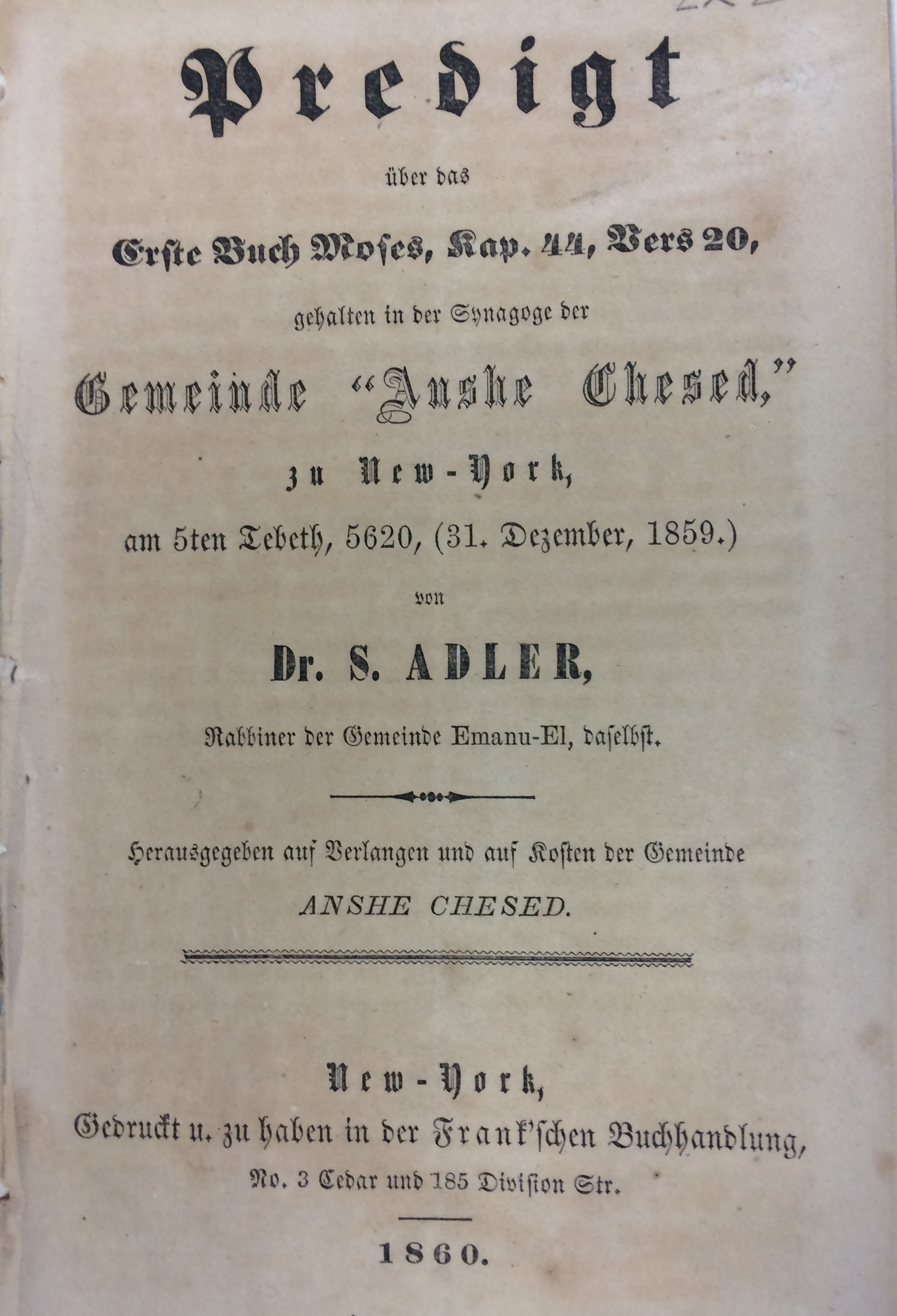
German sermon delivered at Ansche Chesed by Rabbi Samuel Adler, 1860

The congregation was founded in 1828 by a group of German, Dutch, and Polish Jews who split off from Congregation B'nai Jeshurun. Before 1850, the congregation met at various locations, including 32 and 38 Henry Street. By 1850, when the congregation erected the building on Norfolk Street, on Manhattan's Lower East Side, that is now the Angel Orensanz Center, there had been further secessions, and the congregation was composed of immigrants from Germany. It was also the largest in the United States. In 1874, the congregation merged with Congregation Adas Jeshurun of 221 West 39th Street to form Congregation Beth-El. This group met at a newly constructed synagogue in Yorkville, on the corner of Lexington Avenue and 63rd Street, but by c. 1877 the more traditional German Jews of the congregation reconstituted Ansche Chesed near Lexington Avenue and 113th Street. They were joined by newer immigrants. A small building they used, at 160 East 112th Street, was used by another synagogue, Congregation Tikvath Israel, until at least the mid-1970s, and in 2019 is the Christ Apostolic Church of U.S.A.

In 1908, the congregation was part of the movement of upper-middle-class New Yorkers to the newly fashionable neighborhood of Harlem. They moved from the 112th Street location to a handsome Greek Revival temple at Seventh Avenue and 114th Street. This building, at 1883 Adam Clayton Powell Jr. Boulevard, is listed on the National Register of Historic Places. It cost the congregation $200,000 to erect the building in 1908 and 1909. Edward Shire designed the building using limestone and brick. It had seating for 1,200 worshippers, classrooms for 400, and a glass-walled garden on the roof.

In 1928, the congregation again followed fashion, from Harlem to the even newer Upper West Side of Manhattan, opening its present Byzantine Revival building at West End Avenue and 100th Street. The architect was again Edward I. Shire, and the cost was $1.3 million. The previous location was sold to the Catholic Archdiocese of New York, who opened the Iglesia de Nuestra Señora de la Milagrosa church to serve Harlem's Hispanic demographic. In 1980, the Archdiocese sold it to Mt. Neboh Baptist Church, which still occupies it as of 2019. The cornerstone showing the Hebrew year 5668, and the carved luchos at the top of the building, show its Ansche Chesed heritage.

The West End building was designed to seat 1,600, have social events for 500, and like its predecessor, has a rooftop garden.

== Rabbinical leaders ==
The following individuals have served as rabbi of Ansche Chesed congregation:

- Max Lilienthal (1815–1882) honorary rabbi from 1852 to 1857
- Jonas Bondi Preacher and Chief Rabbi from 1858 to 1859
- J. Mielziner 1868
- J. Kohn 1911–1931

...

- Michael Strassfeld 1982–2001
- Jeremy Kalmanofsky 2001–present
