= Angel Orensanz Center =

Art and performance space in Manhattan, New York

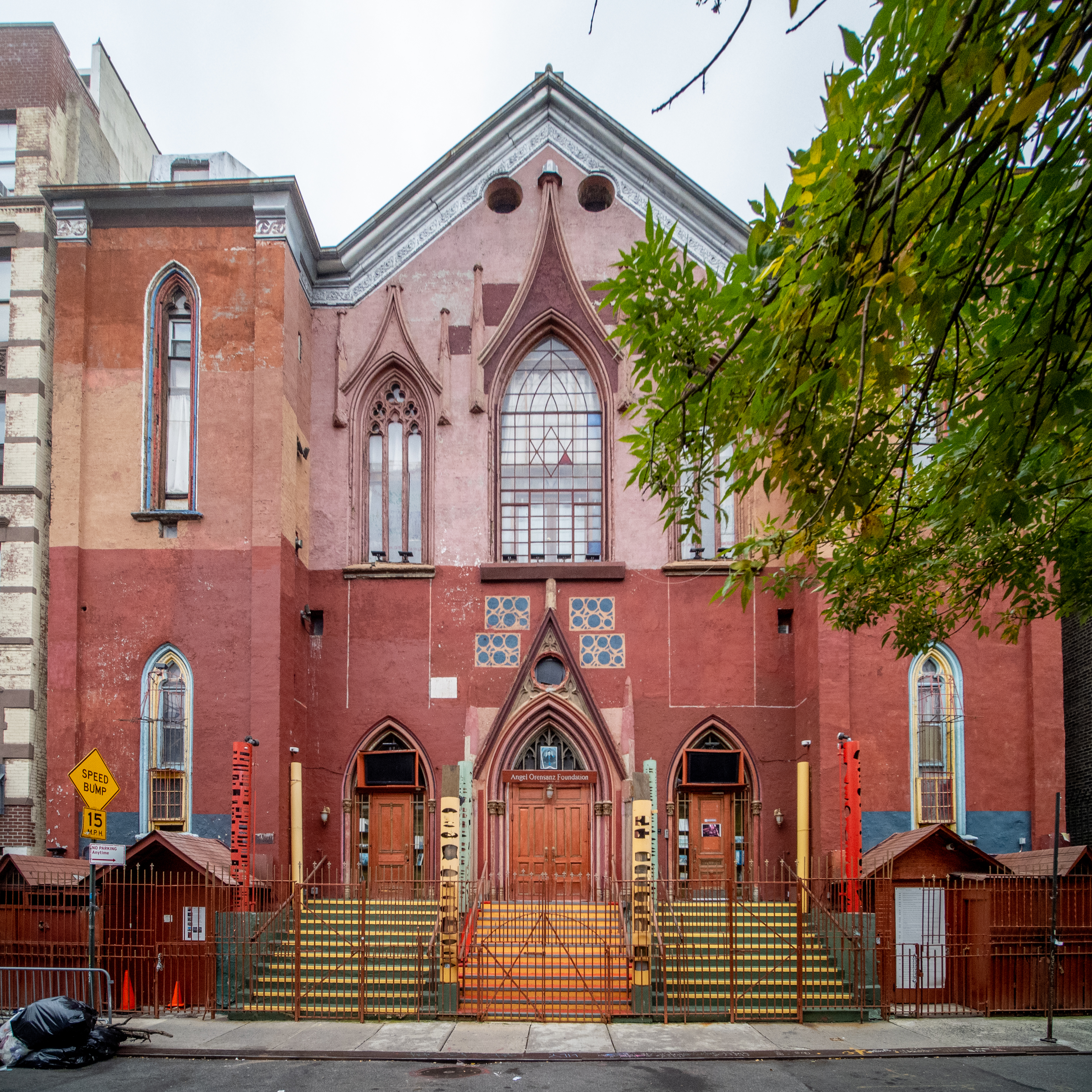
- The Angel Orensanz Center, housed within a former synagogue

- Location in Lower Manhattan
- Former names: Ansche Chesed Conregation
- Established: 1986; 40 years ago
- Location: 172–176 Norfolk Street, Lower East Side, Manhattan, New York City, New York 10002
- Coordinates: 40°43′16″N 73°59′09″W
- Type: Art gallery and performance space
- Founder: Angel Orensanz
- Owner: Angel Orensanz Foundation
- Website: orensanz.org

Site notes
- Architect: Alexander Saeltzer
- Architectural style: Gothic Revival

New York City Landmark
- Designated: June 14, 1983
- Reference no.: 1440

The Angel Orensanz Center is an art and performance space at 172 Norfolk Street, between Stanton Street and East Houston Street, on the Lower East Side of Manhattan in New York City. It was originally built as a synagogue, running through a succession of congregations and continues to be used as one occasionally as The Shul of New York.

It was erected in 1849, making it the oldest surviving synagogue building in New York City, and the fourth-oldest surviving synagogue building in the United States. It was the largest synagogue in the United States at the time of its construction and is one of the few built in the Gothic Revival style.

From 1849 to 1974, at various stages, the building has been used as a synagogue. and then, following vandalism, acquired by the government of New York City (1981), after which it was sold to a succession of owners: Hungarian Development, Inc. (1983), Seashells, Inc. (1984), and finally Angel Lopez Orensanz (1986). Spanish sculptor and painter Angel Orensanz purchased the property in 1986, about after 12 years after its last synagogue-owners had abandoned its use. He restored it and converted it into an art gallery and performance space known as the Angel Orensanz Foundation Center for the Arts. The New York City Landmarks Preservation Commission designated the building as a historic landmark the following year. It subsequently became home to The Shul of New York, a liberal non-denominational synagogue.

== Structure ==
The building's interior resembles that of the Cathedral of Notre-Dame in Paris. The sanctuary was designed to resemble the Sistine Chapel.

The building is 70 feet (21 m) wide by 90 feet (27 m) deep. It has a main space of 7,000 square feet (650 m^{2}) (and an assembly room of 4,000 square feet (370 m^{2})) and 50-foot (15 m) high cathedral blue ceilings. It has pointed arch tall lancet windows (originally surrounded by trefoil tracery and moldings) and doorways (surrounded by parts of moldings showing engaged columns and foliate capitals). Its larger center door is crowned by triangular molding that is almost as high as the second floor, which contains a Magen David with thin pinnacles on either side. It also has interior wooden vaults and several balconies (one of which houses Angel Orensanz's studio). It has a tripartite front facade of red stone brick, covered with stucco, framed at its top by a pointed gable. Originally, the building was three stories high and topped by concave pyramidal roofs with finials atop them; today, it is two stories high and topped by buttressed, clearly differentiated side square towers on either side of the center section. The towers were an unusual feature at the time they were built, containing articulated stairwells to the galleries. Its original ceiling was deep blue, with gold stars.

The building was designated a New York City Historic Landmark in 1987.

== History ==
=== Early history ===
The synagogue was built by Congregation Ansche Chesed (People of Kindness), at time known as Anshe Slonim, the third Jewish congregation in New York City, Congregation Ansche Chesed purchased the three lots upon which the synagogue was built, at 172 Norfolk Street (between Stanton Street and East Houston Street), on the Lower East Side of New York City in April 1849 for $10,500 (today $406,000). The lots had originally been part of Peter Stuyvesant's estate.

The synagogue building was designed by Eisenach (Germany)-born architect Alexander Saeltzer, who was engaged in February 1849. Saeltzer also later designed the original Astor Library (now The Public Theater) in 1851 and the Academy of Music on Astor Place in 1854. The synagogue's Gothic Revival style was inspired by the Cologne Cathedral in Cologne, Germany, and Friedrichswerdersche Kirche in Berlin. According to a 1987 report by the New York City Landmarks Preservation Commission, while Gothic architecture is closely associated with Christianity, it had also become popular with synagogues as Jewish congregations had taken over old church buildings and become accustomed to the style and viewed it as just as appropriate as any other architectural style. The building opened in 1849 as Anshe Chesed Synagogue and was also known as the Norfolk Street Congregation.

After Ansche Chesed left in 1874, the synagogue was used by several Eastern European Orthodox Jewish congregations, which reconfigured the space to the more traditional orientation and removed the organ. These included Congregation Shaari Rachmim (1873–1886), The First Hungarian Congregation Ohab Zedek (1886–1921). and Sheveth Achim Anshe Slonim (1921–1974), the latter of whom called it Anshe Slonim Synagogue. By 1974, the Slonim community had dispersed, and the synagogue building was abandoned and was vandalized.

=== Recent history ===
Jewish Spanish sculptor and painter Angel Orensanz purchased the property in 1986. He restored it and converted it into an art gallery and performance space, the Angel Orensanz Foundation for the Arts, which he operated along with his brother, Al. The building was designated an historic landmark by New York City in 1987.

The Shul of New York, a liberal Reform synagogue organized in 1997 that was founded by Rabbi Emeritus Burt Siegel who originally held the Shul's Shabbat services at the synagogue and they still hold Rosh Hashanah and Yom Kippur services there. Rabbi Susan Falk has led The Shul of New York since 2021. The Shul's services are accompanied by the Shul Band, led by Adam Feder. It is the oldest standing synagogue in New York City.

In 1994, the controversial Andres Serrano-directed music video for Godflesh's song "Crush My Soul" was filmed in the center. Sarah Jessica Parker and Matthew Broderick were married there in 1997. Mandy Patinkin's Mamaloshen was also performed there, and Nobel Prize winner Elie Wiesel, poet Maya Angelou, playwright Arthur Miller, actress Tyne Daly, composer Philip Glass, and singers Whitney Houston and Mariah Carey have performed there. In 2003, Avril Lavigne recorded her music video for "Losing Grip" there with Liz Friedlander as the director. Taking Back Sunday's live acoustic album Live from Orensanz was recorded here in 2010. It was the venue for the 2011 live recording of MTV Unplugged by Florence + The Machine. In 2015, Venture Opera staged three performances of Mozart's opera Don Giovanni at the Orensanz Center. The same year, the center was used in the filming of an episode of Jessica Jones.

Photographer Daniel Hastings used the interior of the synagogue as the backdrop for the cover art for the Wu-Tang Clan's 1993 album Enter the Wu-Tang (36 Chambers).

In 2014, the building was closed for fear that the balcony would collapse, and it did not reopen for nearly a year.
