= Hatsofe B'Erez Hachadosho =

- Discipline: Hebrew periodical
- Language: Hebrew

Publication details
- History: 1871–1876
- Publisher: Zev Hirsch Bernstein (United States)

Standard abbreviations
- ISO 4: Hatsofe B'Erez Hachadosho

Hatsofe B'Erez Hachadosho (1871–1876) was the first Hebrew periodical in the United States. It was compiled and published by Zev Hirsch Bernstein. It contained Jewish and general current events of local, national and international interest, essays, poetry, history, biography, and rabbinics.
