= Congregation Ohab Zedek =

Orthodox synagogue in New York City

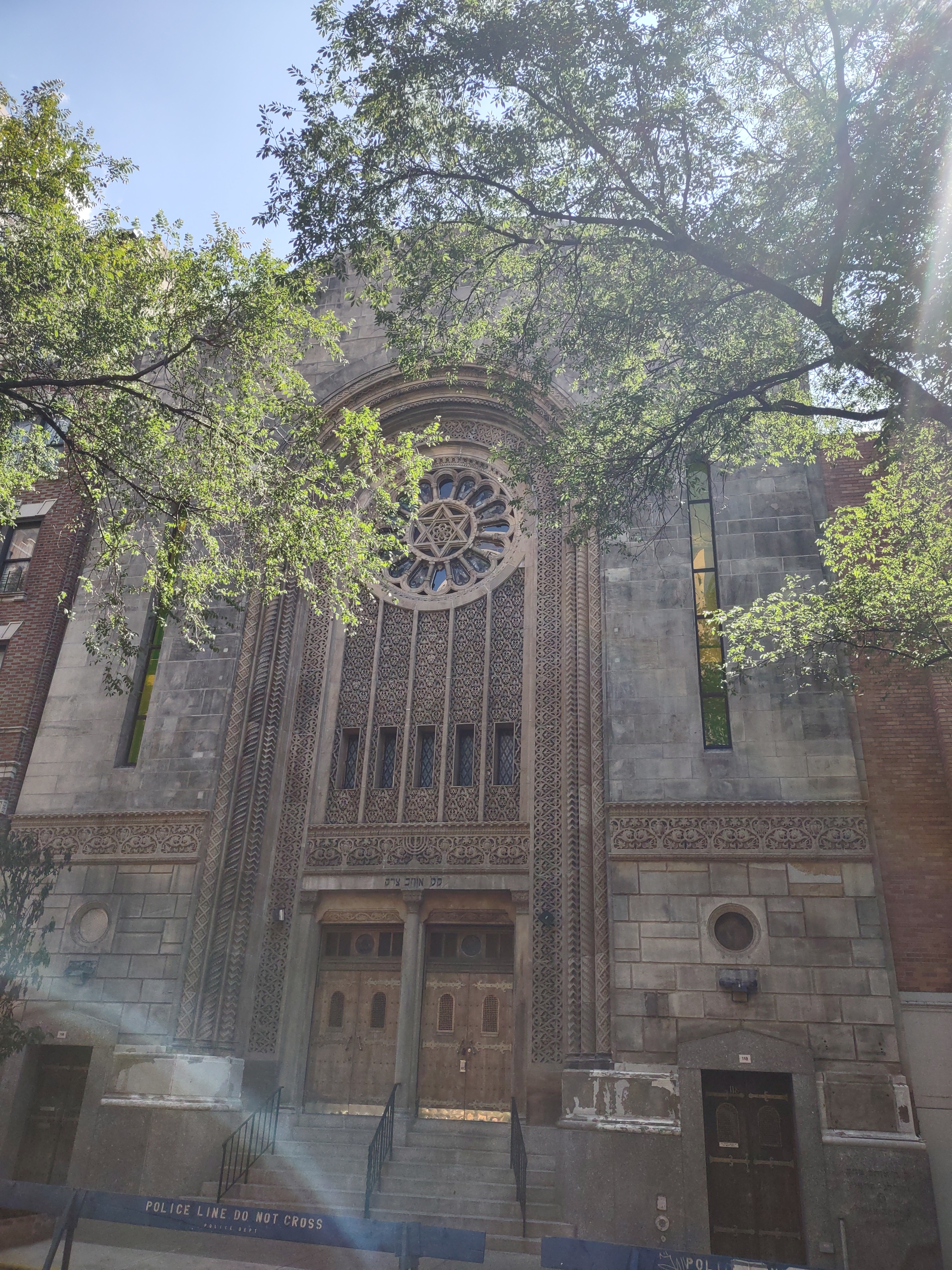

- Location in Manhattan

Religion
- Affiliation: Modern Orthodox Judaism
- Ecclesiastical or organisational status: Synagogue
- Leadership: Rabbi Allen Schwartz
- Status: Active

Location
- Location: 118 West 95th Street, New York, New York 10025
- Country: United States
- Coordinates: 40°47′33″N 73°58′8″W

Architecture
- Architects: Charles B. Myers; Herman H. Sohn
- Type: Synagogue
- Style: Moorish Revival
- Established: 1873 (as a congregation)
- Completed: 1881 (Lower East Side; 1886 (172 Norfolk Street); 1907 (116th Street); 1926 (Upper West Side)

Website
- ozny.org
- Congregation Ohab Zedek
- U.S. National Register of Historic Places
- New York State Register of Historic Places
- NRHP reference No.: 100001487
- NYSRHP No.: 06101.001456

Significant dates
- Added to NRHP: August 18, 2017
- Designated NYSRHP: June 19, 2017

Congregation Ohab Zedek, sometimes abbreviated as OZ and formally known as the First Hungarian Congregation Ohab Zedek, is a Modern Orthodox Jewish congregation and synagogue located at 118 West 95th Street on the Upper West Side of Manhattan in New York City. The congregation is known for its lively, youthful congregation. Founded in 1873, it moved to its current location in 1926. The current clergy are Senior Rabbi Allen Schwartz and senior gabbai Allen Katz. Other current staff members include President, Johnny Glaser, Executive Director, Chad Hopkovitz and Secretary Jeff Korenman.

== History ==
=== Lower East Side ===
Congregation Ohab Zedek was founded in 1873 on the Lower East Side. The congregation built a synagogue building at 70 Columbia Street in 1881. In 1886 the congregation sold the Columbia Street building to Congregation Ahavath Acheim Anshe Ungarn and moved into the Gothic Revival-style synagogue at 172 Norfolk Street that is now the Angel Orensanz Center, the oldest surviving synagogue building in New York and the fourth-oldest in the United States. Rabbi Philip Klein served as its rabbi from 1890 to his death in 1926.

=== 116th Street building ===
In 1906–07 the congregation built and moved into a "monumental" building on 116th Street, in the newly fashionable neighborhood of Harlem. The "monumental" design was influenced by the Gothic character of the previous Norfolk Street home. The street-facing gable prominently featured a large four-centered arch-headed window over a large pedimented doorcase, appearing styled in loose or Vernacular Gothic on the interface of Moorish Revival architecture.

The famous singer Yossele Rosenblatt was a cantor there from 1911 to 1926, and again in 1929.

In 1926 OZ moved to its present building at 118 West 95th Street; the 116th Street property was sold, eventually becoming the Baptist Temple Church, which occupied the location for over five decades. Conversion into a church removed the Jewish-themed terracotta ornaments. Costly structural damage necessitated the building's demolition, which occurred slowly throughout late 2009 and early 2010.

=== West 95th Street ===
The current synagogue building at 118 West 95th Street (constructed in 1926) is noted for its Moorish Revival architecture. Designed by architect Charles B. Myers, the interior features magnificent Mudéjar style plasterwork. The building was listed on the National Register of Historic Places on August 18, 2017.

Early in the 21st century, the congregation became known for attracting large numbers of Orthodox Jewish singles to its services and programs. The congregation published a book in 2005 about its history, First Hungarian Congregation Ohab Zedek, written by Chaim Steinberger, a member of the congregation.

Allen Schwartz has been the Rabbi since 1988.
