= Cornelius Vanderbilt (disambiguation) =

Cornelius Vanderbilt (1794–1877) was an American entrepreneur known as the Commodore.

Cornelius Vanderbilt may also refer to:

- Cornelius Jeremiah Vanderbilt (1830–1882), American farmer and gambler, son of the Commodore
- Cornelius Vanderbilt II (1843–1899), American socialite and businessman, nephew of the gambler
- Cornelius Vanderbilt III (1873–1942), American military officer, inventor, engineer, and yachtsman, son of the socialite
- Cornelius Vanderbilt IV (1898–1974), American newspaper publisher, son of the military officer
