= West Hill Historic District (West Hartford, Connecticut) =

Historic district in Connecticut, United States

- U.S. National Register of Historic Places
- U.S. Historic district
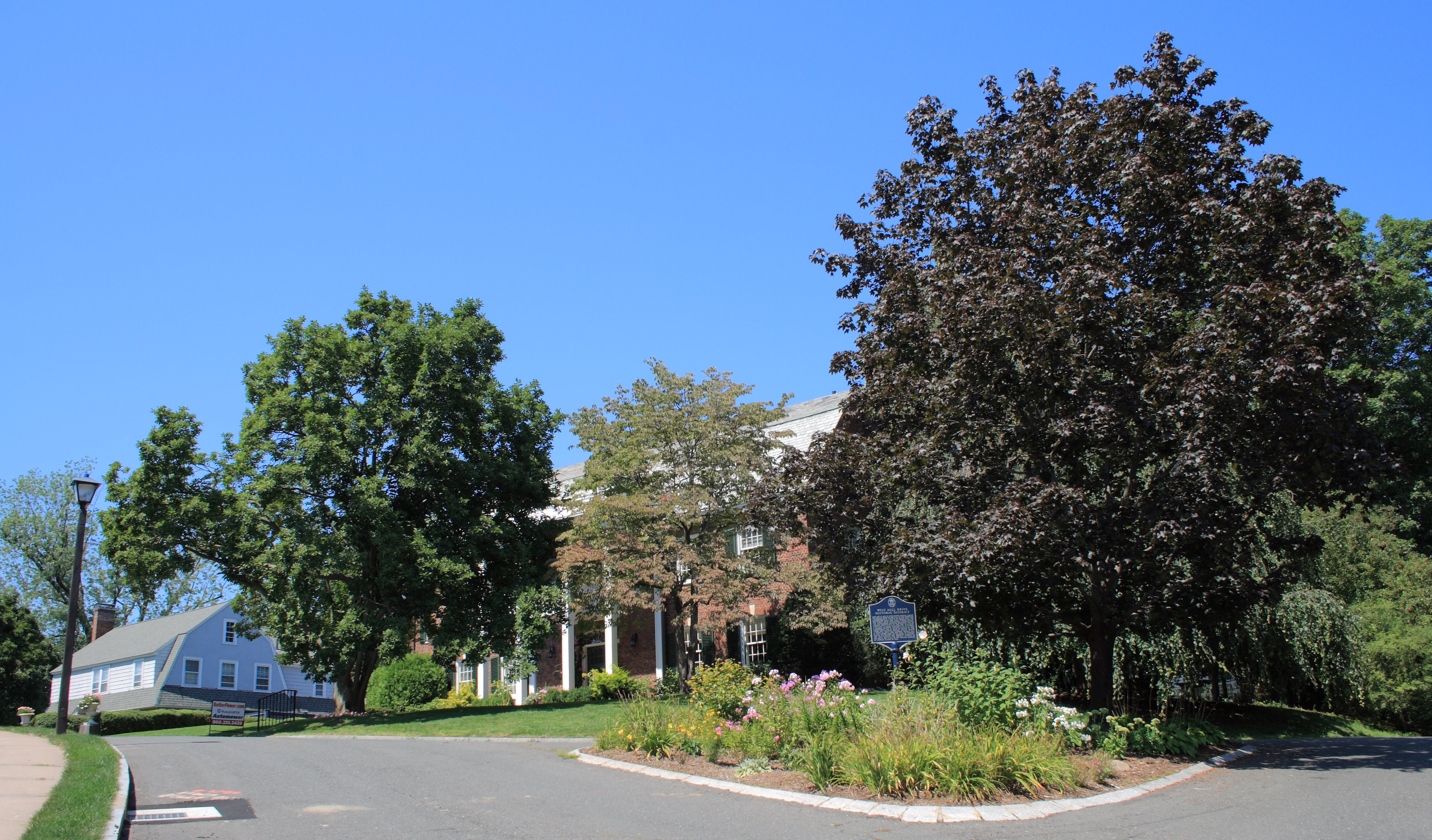

- Location within Connecticut Location within the United States
- Location: West Hill Drive bounded by Farmington Avenue, West Hartford, Connecticut
- Coordinates: 41°45′59″N 72°43′28″W
- Area: 11 acres (4.5 ha)
- Architect: multiple
- Architectural style: Colonial Revival, Tudor Revival
- NRHP reference No.: 96001366
- Added to NRHP: November 29, 1996

The West Hill Historic District is a prestigious residential subdivision of the town of West Hartford, Connecticut. Originally the site of the estate of Cornelius J. Vanderbilt, son of transportation magnate Cornelius Vanderbilt, it was developed as a planned subdivision of upper-class residences in the 1920s. It was established as a local historic district in 1988, and was listed on the National Register of Historic Places in 1996.

== Description and history ==
The West Hill subdivision is located east of West Hartford center, on the north side of Farmingtion Avenue between Vanderbilt Road and Hamilton Avenue. West Hill Drive consists of a semi-circular loop with ends on Farmington Avenue, and a longer loop extending northward from that one. The subdivision is flanked on two sides by a low brownstone wall that was originally part of the Vanderbilt estate, and is entered through original openings flanked by piers. The subdivision has 25 residences, set on properties roughly 0.5 acres (0.20 ha) in size. All are two stories in height, and of similar massing and setback, although they differ stylistically. Fourteen of the houses are Colonial Revival in style, nine are Tudor Revival, and two are a combination of the two styles. All but two are finished in either brick or stucco.

Land for the West Hill estate was purchased in 1857 by "Commodore" Cornelius Vanderbilt as a place for his epileptic son Cornelius Jeremiah Vanderbilt to live. It was not immediately developed, and was sold by the father in 1872 and repurchased by the son in 1879. He had the estate developed, but never lived there, and committed suicide in New York City in 1882. The estate was purchased by Ira Dimock in 1888. Dimock's son demolished the mansion in 1918, and platted out the subdivision. The further development of the area was constrained by a number of restrictive covenants, including stipulations that the wall be retained, setbacks of the house from West Hill Drive be exactly 15 feet (4.6 m), the house cost at least $10,000, and that it be designed by a seller-approved architect. The development process was largely overseen by Dimock's business partner Horace Grant. Early residents of the area were mainly prominent local businessmen.

== Gallery ==
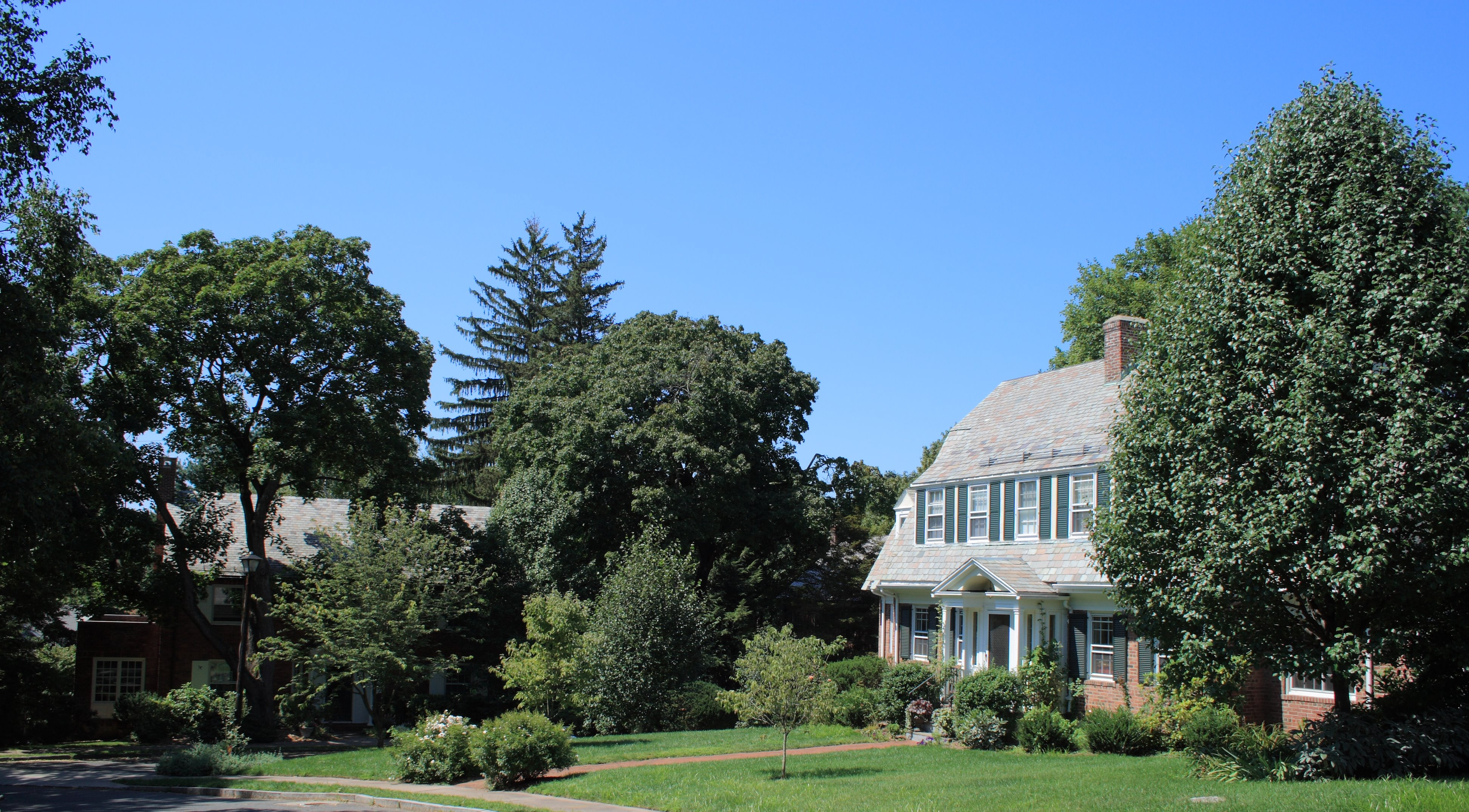

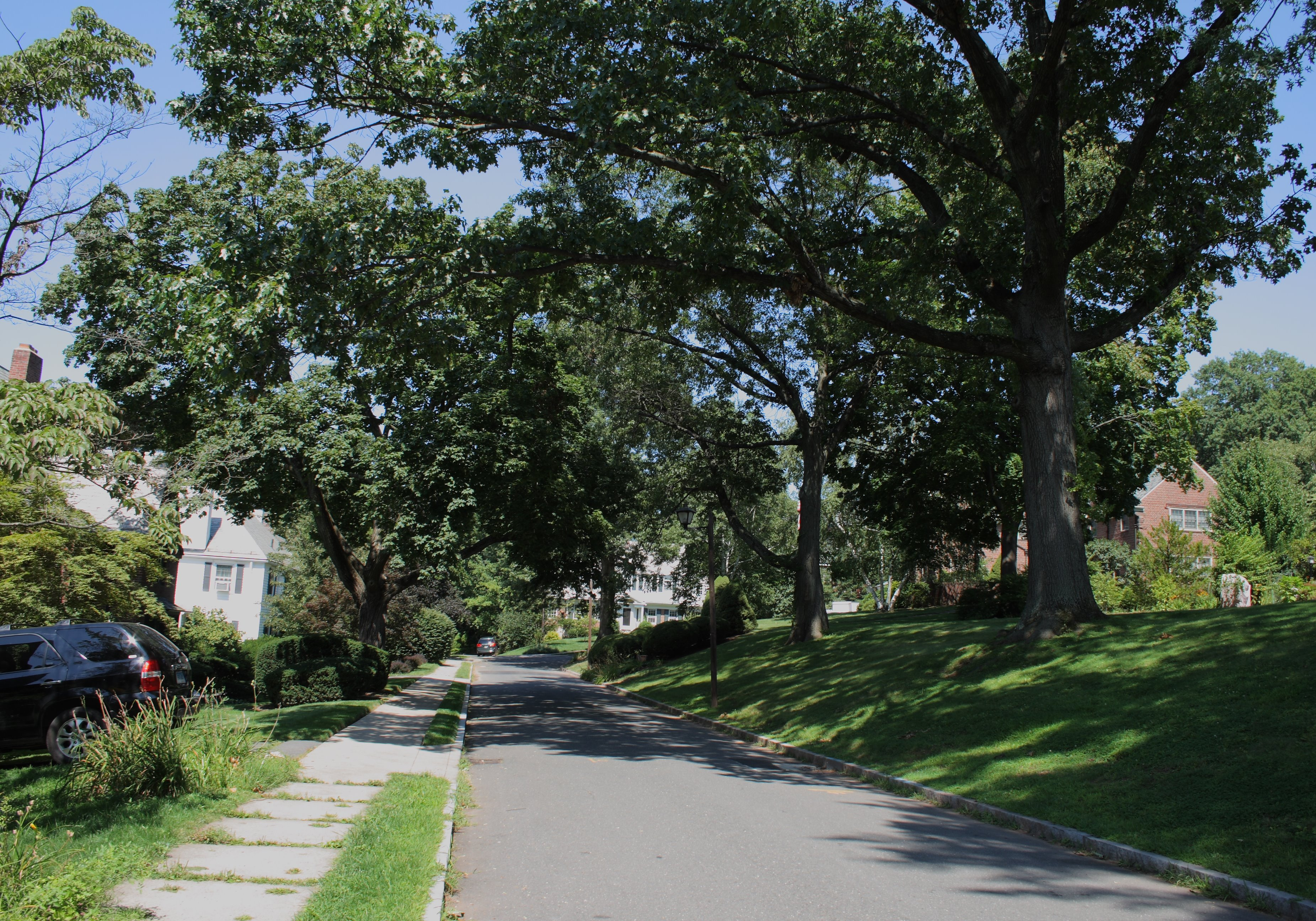

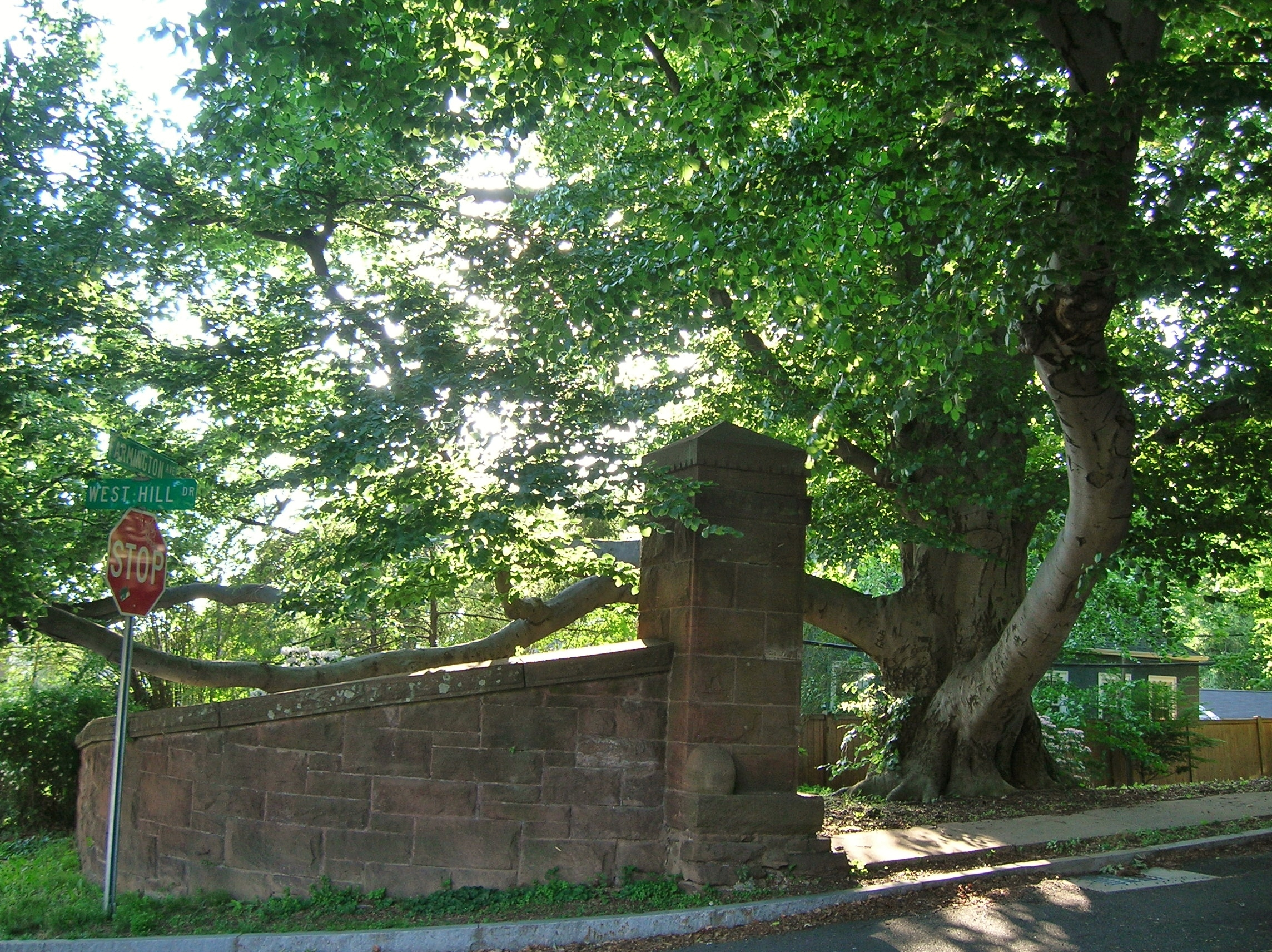

== See also ==
- National Register of Historic Places listings in West Hartford, Connecticut
