= George N. Terry =

American hotelier (1838–1899)

- Born: February 6, 1838
- Died: June 2, 1899 (aged 61)
- Burial place: Mount Pleasant Cemetery, Center Moriches, New York
- Parent(s): Nelson Terry; Eunice Terry

George Nelson Terry (February 6, 1838 – June 2, 1899) was a colonel during the American Civil War, before going on to become a hotelier. In 1867, Terry started a very close friendship with Cornelius Jeremiah Vanderbilt, and was the one to find him after his suicide in 1882.

== Early life ==
George Terry's great-grandfather came from Connecticut around 1783 and took over the Moriches Inn in Center Moriches, New York, renaming it Terry's Hotel. He was the fourth child born to Nelson and Eunice Terry, and was raised in Brookhaven, New York.

== Career ==
Opening in 1864, Terry was the first lessee of the Hoffman House following its construction. That November, Major general Benjamin Butler established his military headquarters at Terry's newly opened Hoffman House hotel.

In January 1866, there was discussion of demolishing the United States Hotel to make space to widen the road. Citizens were opposed to the plans, and The New York Times wrote: "Nothing could more completely illustrate the utter helplessness of the taxpayers of this city against any raid that organized self-interest..." In 1867, Terry reopened the United States Hotel which was located on the corner of Fulton and Water streets, with the intention to conduct it on the European plan. In 1869, after a client died of suffocation at the U.S. Hotel, Terry had to testify at the Coroner's Jury trial. Terry was the proprietor of the United States Hotel until May 1872.

In December 1873, George met with Cornelius Vanderbilt about a business venture in Toledo, Ohio. The Commodore passed on the venture, and in February 1874, Terry acquired the Island House hotel, located on Lake Shore Road, leaving his brother to manage it. His expansion into Ohio continued when he established William C. Terry & Company with his brother, to operate the Hotel French, in Lima, Ohio. On July 11, 1892, Terry left on a trip to Mt. Clemens, Michigan. In 1896, George and William decided to sell the Hotel French to E.B. Hawkins.

In 1892, at the Hotel Florence in Jamestown, which Terry owned, a murder-suicide took place.

== Personal life ==
In 1867, George while he was the proprietor of the United States Hotel, met for the first time Cornelius J. Vanderbilt, who was staying at the hotel. From the start of their friendship, Terry saw Cornelius frequently and visited his home in Hartford multiple times where he became acquainted with Ellen Williams, Cornelius' wife.

Vanderbilt biographer T. J. Stiles, has questioned whether George and Cornelius were lovers, based on the intensity of their letters, including a letter where Cornelius writes: "Oh! George I cannot give you up. You must not desert me now, but must be brave & patient, and give me encouragement and hope for the future."

When Ellen died in March 1872, George and Cornelius became constant companions, sometimes sleeping in the same room and sometimes in adjoining apartments. Later that year, they went on a trip where they stopped in Omaha, Nebraska.

On November 25, 1872, George and Cornelius posed for a photograph with General Robert O. Tyler and two others while in Hong Kong.

=== Cornelius Vanderbilt trial ===
On December 28, 1877, Terry was called as a witness during Cornelius Jeremiah Vanderbilt's lawsuit attempting to break his father's will. After a two-month break, the lawsuit resumed February 26, 1878, with Terry being the first witness called back to testify. Cornelius' counsel, Mr. Scott Lord, questioned Terry in relation to his meetings with Cornelius J. at the Fifth Avenue Hotel in October and November 1874. Terry testified he had no recollection of meeting with Cornelius in the afternoon, and that they would have met in the evenings. He also testified that he had made, "no arrangement by which he was to receive a share in the proceeds if the litigation should prove successful."

During the cross-examination, Henry L. Clinton, William Vanderbilt's lawyer, tried to discredit Terry, and claimed W.H. Vanderbilt removed Terry's brother from Island House through the officials of Lake Shore road due to non-payment of rent. Mr. Lord denied the claims, stating he was, "prepared to show that every dollar due had been paid, and even a year in advance."

=== World travels ===
George and Cornelius departed for a trip to Europe on September 4, 1880. After arriving in Liverpool on September 16, they traveled to Cairo where they were joined by the American representative in the International Court of Egypt. They set out on an exploring expedition up the Nile, before traveling to the Holy Land, and to St. Petersburg. From thence, they crossed the Ural Mountains into Siberia, went to China, before returning back to New York via a Pacific Mail steam-ship.

On March 1, 1881, George and Cornelius traveled to Washington, DC together, because, Cornelius had been invited to attend a reception thrown for President Rutherford B. Hayes by Congressman Simeon B. Chittenden and his wife.

On July 20, 1881, George and Cornelius departed on a trip for Europe via SS Arizona, they arrived to Liverpool on July 28. They returned to New York on September 27, via the SS City of Richmond.

On January 24, 1882, George, and Cornelius, arrived in Chicago together and stayed at the Tremont House.

In February, they traveled to Hot Springs, Arkansas, in the hopes the Hot Springs could improve Cornelius' health which had been failing. From there, George and Cornelius traveled down to Florida, before returning to New York on March 18.

=== Cornelius' 1882 Suicide ===
"Mr. Vanderbilt and myself about four weeks ago returned from Florida, where Mr. Vanderbilt had been spending the winter for his health. On our arrival in the city Mr. Vanderbilt engaged a suite of rooms at this hotel. His health has been very poor for some time past, and he was subject to epilepsy and has been confined to his bed for several days."

— George N. Terry, The Associated Press The Buffalo News (April 3, 1882)

Upon returning to New York on March 18, 1882, George and Cornelius checked into the Glenham Hotel located on Broadway. They were given two rooms, No. 79 & No. 80 on the fifth floor, overlooking Fifth Avenue, with a communicating door between the rooms.

On the evening of March 31, Cornelius suffered a "severe" epileptic fit. According to Cornelius' private secretary, Major. E.D. Luxton, on Saturday, April 1, Cornelius put his hand to his head and said, "If I don't get some relief I'll commit suicide. I have nothing to live for." Later that night, Cornelius went out to "No. 12 Ann Street," a local gambling house, He returned to his hotel room in the early hours, and went to bed around 6:30 Sunday morning.

Just after 2 pm on Sunday, April 2, George was surprised by the sound a gunshot. He rushed through the communicating doors to find Cornelius on his back, in bed, having shot himself in the head. George dropped to Cornelius' side, he was still breathing. George spoke to him, but received no answer. George sent for Dr. Robert G. Weir, and Judge E.O. Perrin. Cornelius was unconscious and was suffering from labored breathing. William Henry Vanderbilt was summoned, and arrived shortly with his two sons. Seeing there was nothing to be done, William left at 4:30 pm. Cornelius survived another four hours after the injury, until he died at 6:10 pm.

George Terry was originally of the opinion that Cornelius must have accidentally shot himself while in a fit.

Coroner Brady arrived and questioned Terry while the Deputy Coroner performed the post-mortem examination.

An inquest was held by Coroner Brady on April 6, with a jury composed of by nine physicians. George, was called as a witness in addition to E.D. Luxton - Cornelius' secretary, Dr. Weir - Cornelius' physician, and George B. Ashley. Despite how he was quoted in the Associated Press, during the inquest, George revealed he had no doubt Cornelius committed suicide – rather than it having been an accident.

Following Cornelius' death, his sister Mary A. LeBau Berger challenged his will. Estimated at $759,000, it was reported he left $120,000 to George Terry, and only $1,000 to his sister. She claimed, "that the writing was not his last will; that its execution was not his voluntary act, and that he was not of sound mind at the time he signed it." She alleged Terry attached himself to Cornelius in hopes of getting his money.

=== Death ===
On Saturday, June 3, 1899, in Atlantic City, New Jersey, Terry died of heart failure, at the home of a friend with whom he had lived for several years. No public funeral announcement was made, as a result when he was interred on Tuesday, June 6, at Mount Pleasant Cemetery few non-relatives were present.
