= The Verdendorps =

1880 novel by Basil Verdendorp

The Verdendorps: A Novel
- Author: Basil Verdendorp
- Language: English
- Publisher: Charles M. Hertig
- Publication date: May 1880
- Publication place: United States
- Media type: Print (Hardback)
- Pages: 376 (1st edition)
- LC Class: PZ3.V583 V

The Verdendorps is a satirical roman à clef novel about the Vanderbilt family, told from the point of view of Basil Verdendorp, a stand-in for Cornelius Jeremiah Vanderbilt. Written by Charles Marshal Hertig, a former secretary for Cornelius Vanderbilt II, the novel was published in May 1880, with the author listed as Basil Verdendorp himself. The novel follows Basil Verdendorp's attempt at reconciling with his father, and Richard's attempt to drive a wedge between them (as encouraged by his lawyer) to guarantee Richard receives the most in their father's will. Knowing his father was wrongfully swayed, Basil sues Richard to contest the last will and testament.

== Characters ==
- May Adella Craver: (A stand-in for Frank Armstrong Crawford Vanderbilt) The second wife of Basilius Verdendorp.
- Basil Verdendorp: (A stand-in for Cornelius Jeremiah Vanderbilt) The younger son of Basilius Verdendorp.
- Basilius Verdendorp: (A stand-in for Cornelius Vanderbilt) The lead patriarch of the Verdendorp family, and leader of their railroad empire.
- Richard Verdendorp: (A stand-in for William Henry Vanderbilt) The elder son of Basilius Verdendorp.

== Authorship ==
At the time of publication, it was noted by the Boston Evening Transcript that whomever wrote the novel was "evidently... versed in the ins and outs of criminal law." The paper went on to say, "The author, whoever he may be, is possessed of a sharp pen and a fair ability to use it."

Charles Hertig, who began his career practicing law in Fort Wayne, Indiana, was later hired as the private secretary to Cornelius Vanderbilt II. After working for Vanderbilt, Hertig went on to be the attorney for the Northern Pacific Railway, and write and publish The Verdendorps.

== Reception ==
The book received mixed reviews from critics upon its release. The St. Louis Post-Dispatch panned the book, declaring, "the book has no literary merit, but it is a curious libel - according to the legal interpretation of libel." The Inter Ocean from Chicago, Illinois, proclaimed "...we do not believe [Basil] Verdendorp has a genius for novel writing." The New York Times, proclaimed "The book is entirely destitute of literary merit, which is apparently not attempted. The purpose of the work would seem to be at once personal and malignant."

While The Times-Picayune raved, "With materials so dramatic at hand, the author could not produce other than a most exciting book." The Boston Post, called the novel "the literary hit of the season!"
