= Terry-Ketcham Inn =

Historic commercial building in New York, United States

- U.S. National Register of Historic Places
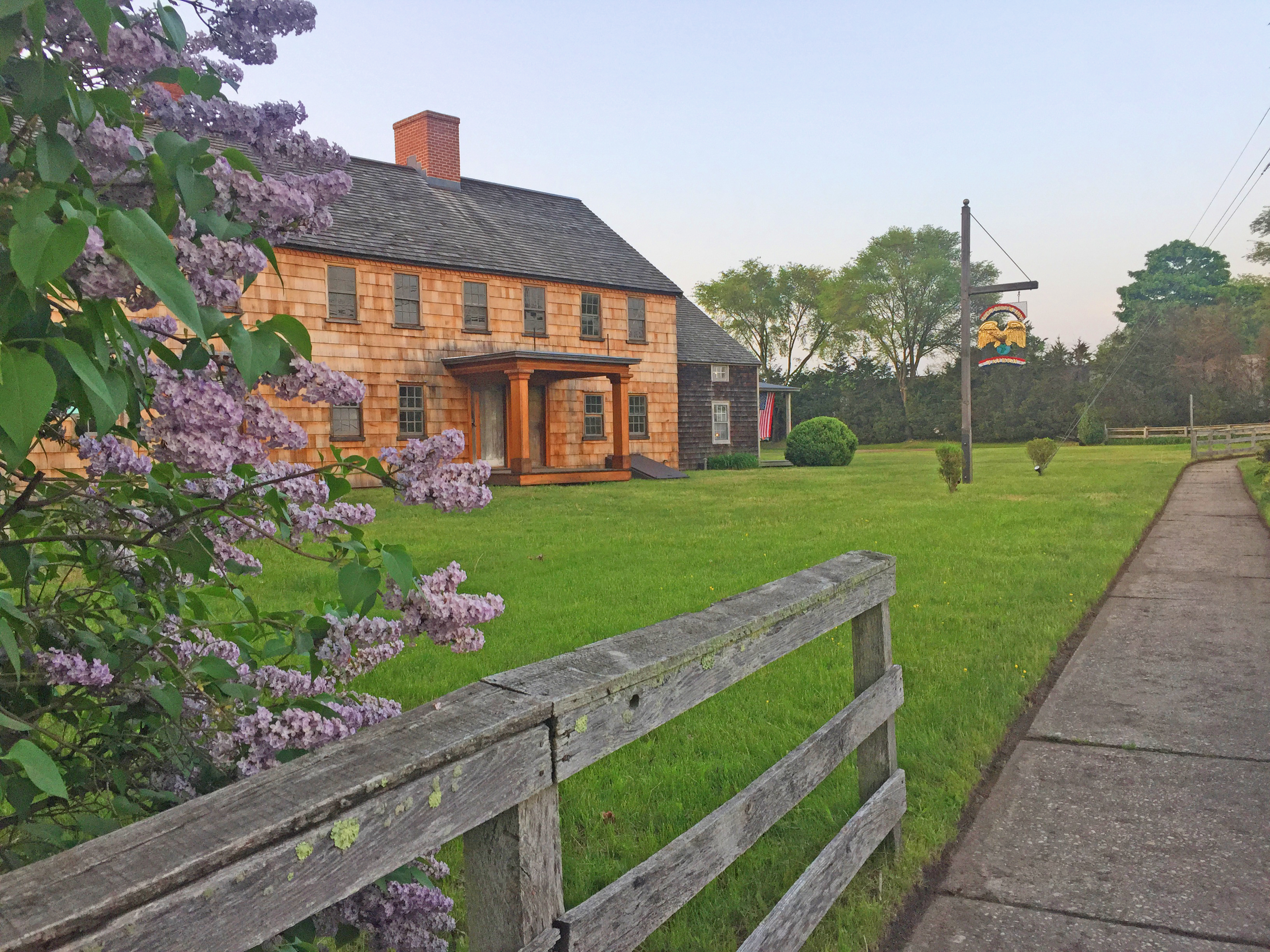
- The Terry-Ketcham Inn, which includes other structures

- Location within New York Location within the United States
- Location: 81 Main Street; Center Moriches, New York
- Coordinates: 40°48′8″N 72°46′52″W
- Area: 1 acre (0.40 ha)
- Built: ca. 1693
- Architectural style: Federal
- Restored by: Bertram Seides, Ketcham Inn Foundation, Inc.
- Website: ketchaminnfoundation.org
- NRHP reference No.: 92000555
- Added to NRHP: June 24, 1993

Terry-Ketcham Inn is a historic inn and tavern located at Center Moriches in Suffolk County, New York. It was built about 1693, expanded about 1710 and 1790, and is a two-story, nine-bay by two-bay frame structure with a rear wing and gable roof. The original structure was built as a two-bay by three-bay, single-story timber-frame cottage. In about 1710 a three-bay by two-bay timber frame half-house was built to the north of the original structure. A 1790 building program tripled the size of the structure.

It was added to the National Register of Historic Places in 1993, and is protected by the New York State Office of Parks, Recreation and Historic Preservation. A historic barn behind the inn is used to sell books, records, and compact discs in order to raise funds for the Ketcham Inn Foundation.

== Gallery ==
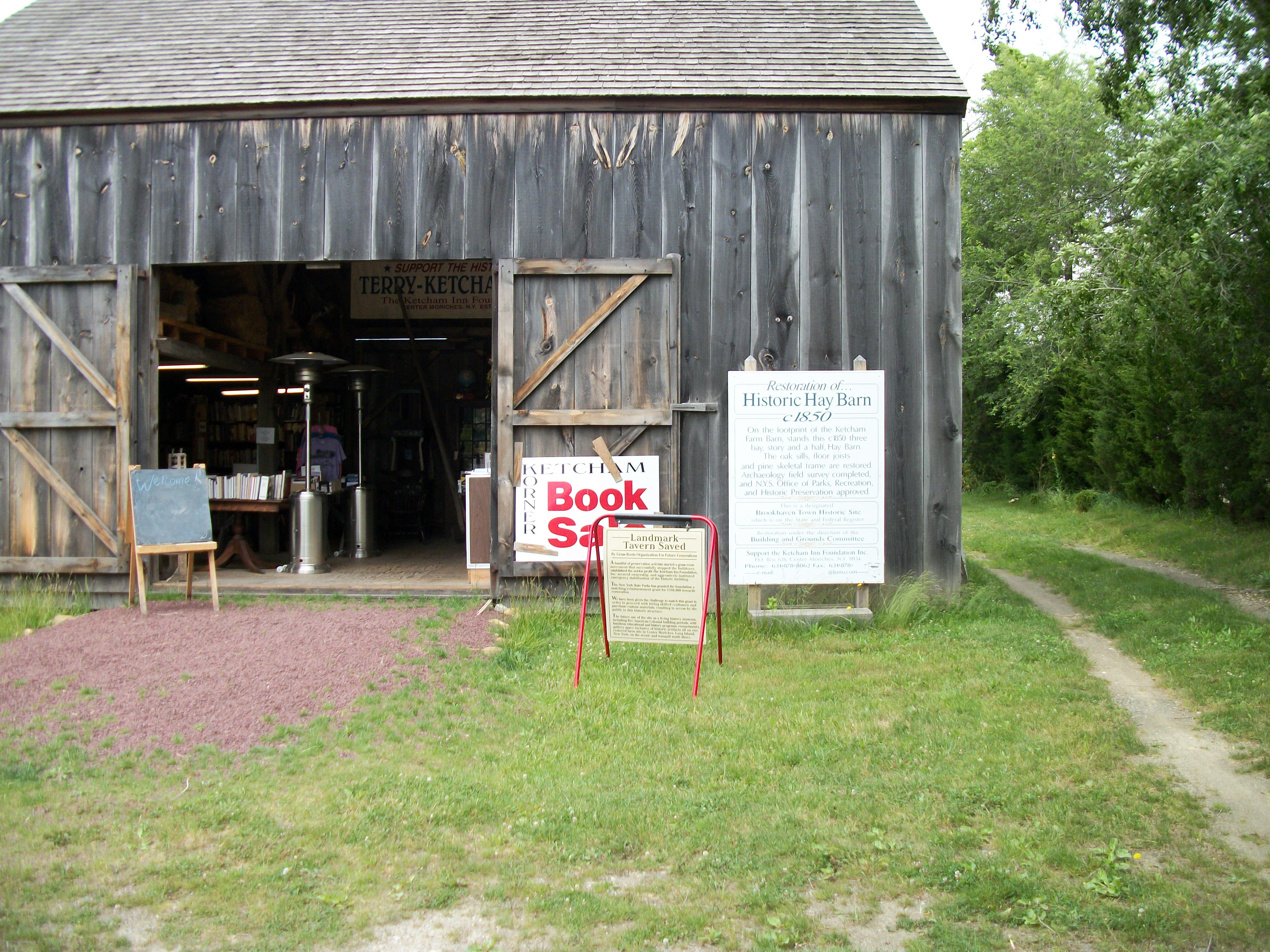
The c.1850-built Hay Barn in the back yard, which is now used to sell used books, records and other items.

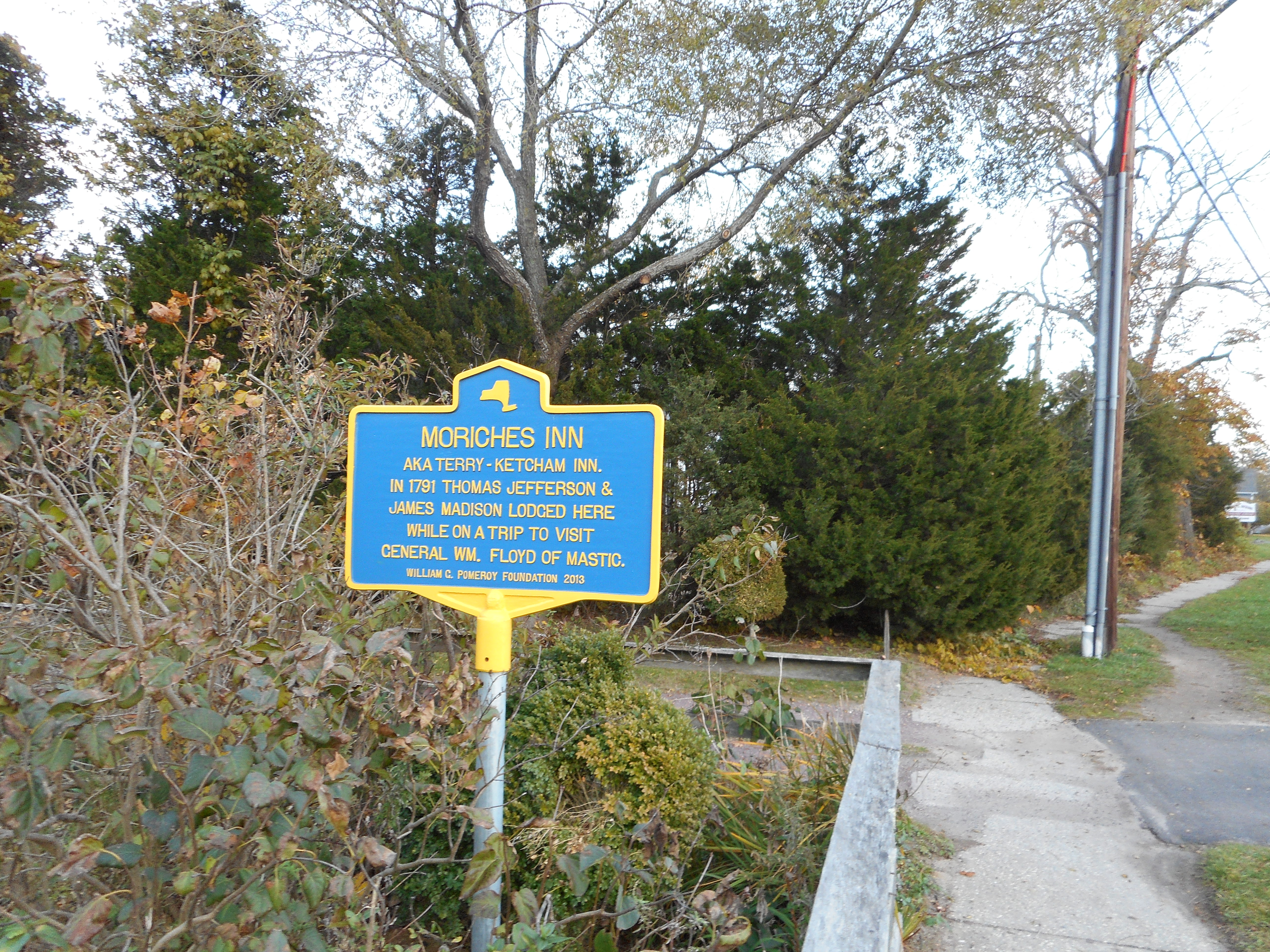
NYS Historic Marker on the southeast corner of the property.

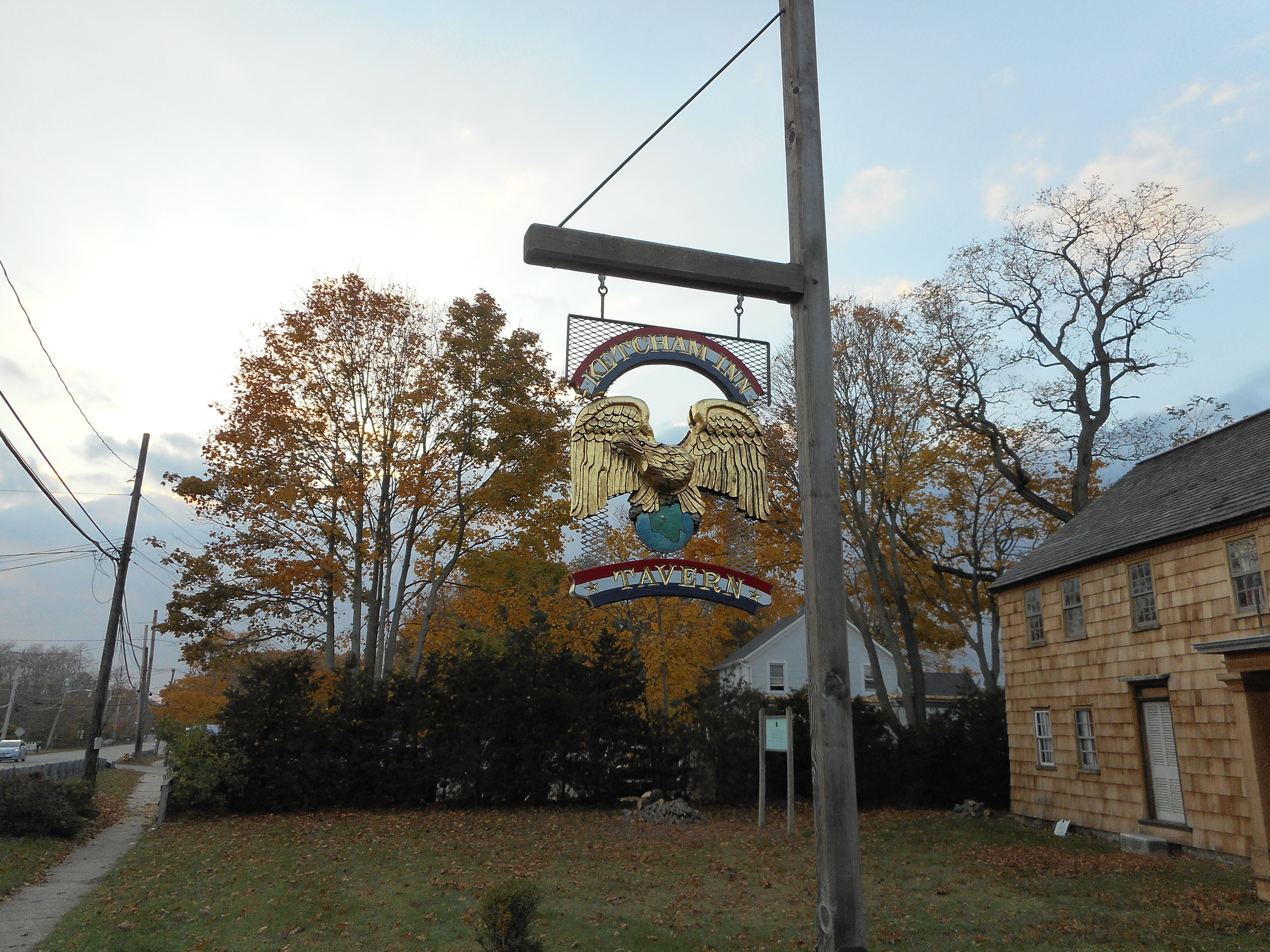
Replica of the type of sign you would see at the Inn during the 18th and 19th centuries.

== Also see ==
- George N. Terry
