= Cornelius Jeremiah Vanderbilt =

American member of the Vanderbilt family

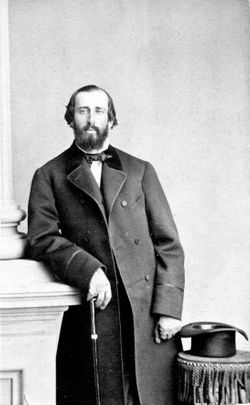
- Born: December 29, 1830; Staten Island, New York, U.S.
- Died: April 2, 1882 (aged 51); Manhattan, New York, U.S.
- Other names: Corneel; Cornie
- Education: Columbia College (1850)
- Occupation: Socialite
- Spouse: Ellen Williams (m. 1856; died 1872)
- Parent(s): Cornelius Vanderbilt; Sophia Johnson
- Relatives: Vanderbilt family

Cornelius Jeremiah Vanderbilt (December 29, 1830 – April 2, 1882) was an American socialite and member of the Vanderbilt family. After having a troubled relationship with his father, Cornelius Vanderbilt, he eventually committed suicide at the age of 51.

== Early life ==
Cornelius "Corneel" Jeremiah Vanderbilt was born on Staten Island on December 29, 1830. He was the second son of thirteen children born to Cornelius Vanderbilt and Sophia Johnson Vanderbilt, who were first cousins. He had 11 siblings who survived to adulthood; Phebe, Ethelinda, Eliza, William ("Billy"), Emily, Sophia, Maria, Frances, Mary, Catherine, and George (who died in 1863 at age 24). Corneel had another brother named George, born in 1832, who died as a child.

According to official records, Corneel matriculated at Columbia College with the class of 1850, but did not graduate with the class.

When he was 18 years old, Corneel began suffering from epilepsy, which his father saw as weakness and even mental derangement, believing his son needed to be in a mental asylum. His father thought the epileptic fits were a punishment on himself for his having married his own cousin.

In 1848, his younger sister Mary heard screaming from Corneel's room, she ran to investigate and found the Commodore beating Cornelius with a riding whip. She intervened and grabbed the whip from his hand.

In 1849, in order to "toughen him up", his father sent the then 18-year-old Corneel off to be a sailor aboard a three-masted schooner which was making its way to California and its gold fields. However, Corneel was stricken ill when he arrived in San Francisco and drew a draft on his father in order to pay for his return to New York. Upon his return, his father had him arrested for drawing the draft and committed him to the Bloomingdale Insane Asylum. Corneel's records from the asylum state: "Form of mental disorder: dementia (supported by father)".

He was finally discharged from the asylum on February 20, 1850.

Corneel being committed to Bloomingdale Insane Asylum by his father happened just five years after his mother, Sophia, had also briefly been committed by his father to the same asylum. In 1844, his father sent Sophia on a trip to Canada with one of their daughters, in order to have more private time with their governess (who promptly quit). When Sophia returned, she found that her husband had purchased a large townhouse at 10 Washington Place in New York City and intended it to be their new residence. She was so upset that she stood up to the domineering Cornelius and steadfastly refused to leave their Staten Island home and friends. The Commodore decided that she was mentally unstable due to this behavior. He told their children that their mother was "in poor health" and that she "was at the change of life." Against protests from all of their children (except William), their father had their mother committed to Bloomingdale Insane Asylum. However, the physicians there insisted she return home. When she did, she reluctantly acquiesced to her husband's demands and moved to Manhattan.

== Career ==
In personal appearance Cornelius J. Vanderbilt did not exhibit any of the sturdy, rugged physical qualities which so greatly distinguished his father, the old Commodore. He had his stature alone, being over 6 feet in height but, in the middle of his life even, he was slender, poorly developed, and without physical energy, and as he grew older he began to stoop at the shoulders and to display the wanness and attenuation of features that usually betray the consumptive tendency. His features, unlike the Commodores, were delicate, and by no means strongly marked.

— C. J. Vanderbilt Obituary, April 3, 1882, The New York Times

On March 4, 1849, young Vanderbilt departed on a ship headed for San Francisco around Cape Horn to work as a crewman. Upon arrival in San Francisco, he abandoned the ship and spent all his money. When he ran out, he tried to charge his expenses to his father, who became livid and interpreted Corneel's actions as a sign of insanity. When Corneel returned to New York in November 1849, his father had him arrested and committed to the Bloomingdale Insane Asylum in New York until February 1850.

After his release, he tried out several occupations, including law clerk, leather merchant, farmer, and revenue agent; all of which he was unsuccessful at. He developed a gambling problem and reportedly used the Vanderbilt name and his considerable charm to borrow money, usually without paying them back. In particular, he obtained significant loans from Horace Greeley, the editor of the New York Tribune who was a long-time friend. Corneel was also close friends with Schuyler Colfax, who later became the 17th Vice President of the United States under Ulysses S. Grant.

In January 1854, the elder Cornelius again had Corneel arrested and committed to the asylum on the grounds of "confusion" and "loose habits." The doctor at the asylum reportedly told Corneel, "I am satisfied that you are no more crazy than I am," and let him go home. His elder brother William told him that they were trying to get him committed to the Asylum in order to avoid Corneel being charged criminally for his acts of forgery, to which Corneel reportedly replied that he would rather be considered a damn rascal than a lunatic.

== Personal life ==
In 1856, he married Ellen Williams (1820–1872) of Hartford, Connecticut, the daughter of a minister. They had no children. The marriage was reportedly the only thing in Corneel's life that pleased his father. The Commodore had purchased a 110-acre West Hartford estate in 1857 as a place for Corneel to live. The land was not developed, and upon receiving it Cornelius built a cottage on the property. With funds from his allowance, (Note: The Commodore gave Corneel an allowance of $200 a week.) Corneel set up a fruit farm in East Hartford, Connecticut, but was unable to make the farm solvent, and had to file for bankruptcy in 1868.

After his mother's death in 1868, and the death of his wife in 1872, the Commodore sold the Hartford property, Vanderbilt "took up with George N. Terry, an unmarried hotel keeper whom Corneel considered 'my dearest friend.'" Vanderbilt biographer T. J. Stiles has questioned whether the two may have been lovers, which the elder Cornelius may have suspected. Their letters between each other were intense, including a letter where Vanderbilt writes: "Oh! George I cannot give you up. You must not desert me now, but must be brave & patient, and give me encouragement and hope for the future."

On November 25, 1872, Cornelius Jeremiah and Terry posed for a photograph with General Robert O. Tyler and two others while in Hong Kong. Terry met with the Commodore in December 1873 about a business proposition in Toledo, Ohio, to which he replied: "Mr. Terry, if you go to Toledo, what will become of Corneel?"

=== Father's estate ===
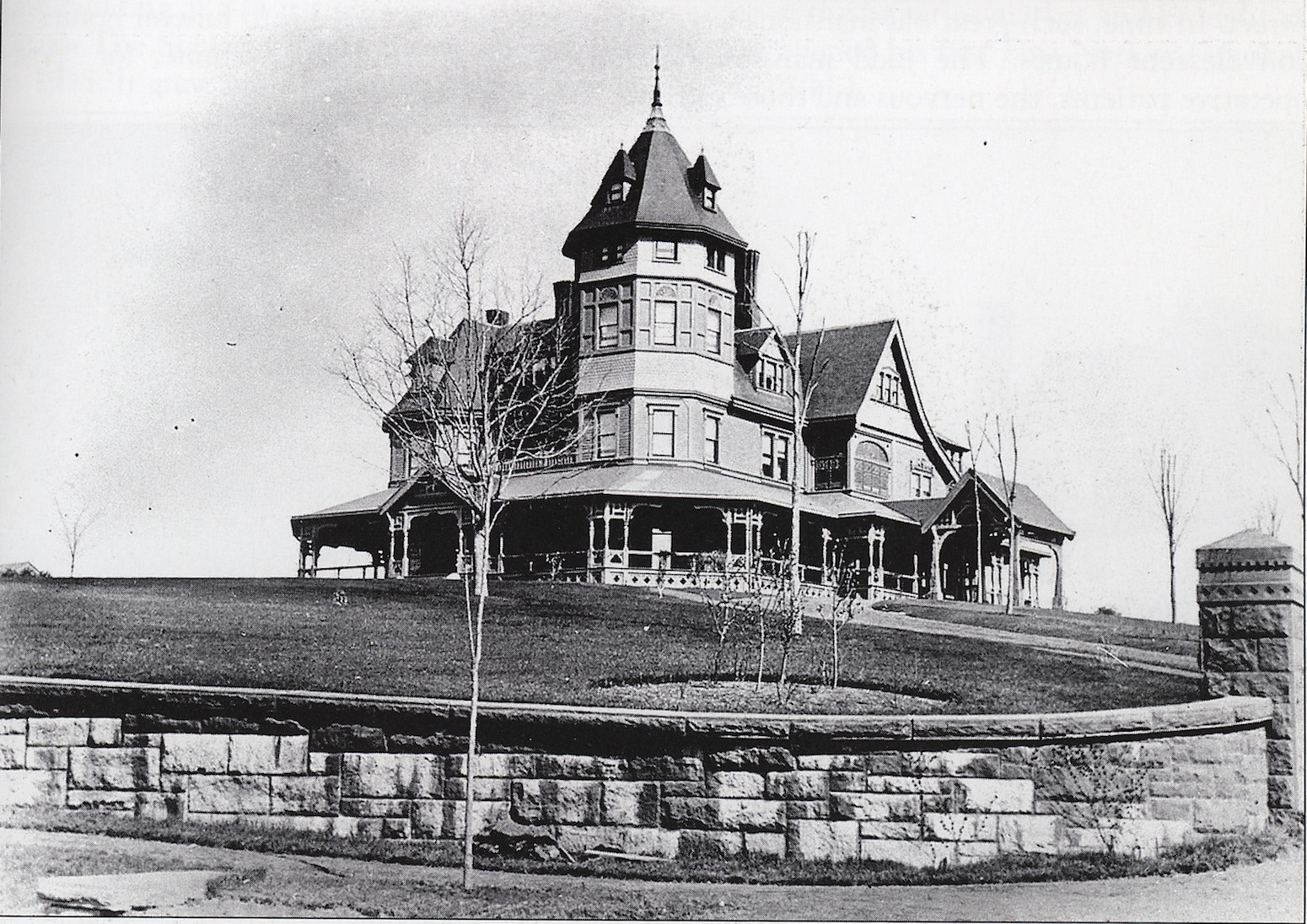
Corneel's mansion, which he was never able to live in, located in West Hartford.

Upon his father's death in 1877, his elder brother William inherited the vast majority of the Vanderbilt estate and holdings (around $100,000,000), becoming the wealthiest man in the United States. According to his father's will, Corneel was only to inherit the income from $200,000 in U.S. Bonds held in trust (receiving 5% interest), which was distributed by trustees who were cautioned to oversee his behavior. Additionally, should Corneel try to advance funds from the Trust, he would lose it altogether.

After a lengthy court battle, William eventually paid Corneel an extra $600,000 ($200,000 in cash and $400,000 in additional trust) allowing him to pay off his debts, including to the estate of the late Horace Greeley, which aggregated to approximately $61,000 including interest.

=== Later life ===
In 1879, two years after the elder Cornelius's death, Corneel repurchased the Hartford estate. After regaining the estate, he demolished the cottage and built a 30-room mansion, designed by John C. Mead, on the land.

In September 1879, Cornelius Jeremiah joined a deputation interested in the success of the proposed Franco-American treaty. The following May, Charles Marshal Hertig the former secretary for Cornelius Vanderbilt II published the satirical novel The Verdendorps. The main character and narrator is Basil Verdendorp, a direct stand-in for Corneel. The novel uses large portions of his life, and includes the lawsuit over his father's will.

According to his obituary, "almost immediately after the settlement Cornelius J. went to Europe, accompanied by his particular friend, Mr. Terry, and remained abroad over six months." Cornelius and George departed for Europe on September 4, 1880. After arriving in Liverpool, they traveled to Cairo where they were joined by the American representative in the International Court of Egypt. They set out on an exploring expedition up the Nile, before traveling to the Holy Land, and to St. Petersburg. From thence, they crossed the Ural Mountains into Siberia, went to China, before returning back to New York via a Pacific Mail steam-ship.

On March 1, 1881, Cornelius Jeremiah and George N. Terry traveled to Washington, DC together. The next evening, Cornelius Jeremiah attended a reception thrown for President Rutherford B. Hayes by Congressman Simeon B. Chittenden and his wife.

On July 20, 1881, Corneel and George Terry departed on a trip for Europe via SS Arizona, and they returned on September 27, via the SS City of Richmond. The following January 6, Cornelius Jeremiah attended a dinner thrown by Darius Ogden Mills for the trustees of the Metropolitan Museum of Art In February 1882, Cornelius and George visited hot springs, before traveling down to Florida. They returned to New York in the middle of March, three weeks before he would commit suicide.

=== 1882 suicide ===
On the evening of March 31, 1882, Cornelius suffered from an epileptic fit described as "severe spasm." According to Cornelius' private secretary, Major. E.D. Luxton, on Saturday, April 1, Cornelius put his hand to his head and said, "If I don't get some relief I'll commit suicide. I have nothing to live for."

On April 2, 1882, reportedly after a night spent at gambling at "No. 12 Ann Street", the 51-year-old C.J. Vanderbilt took his own life by firing his Smith & Wesson revolver into his left temple while staying in his fifth floor room, number 80, at the Glenham Hotel on Fifth Avenue in New York City. He was discovered by George Terry, who was referred to in Vanderbilt's obituary as "his friend and constant companion." Terry was staying in an adjoining room, number 79, and reportedly rushed through the connecting door to Corneel's room upon hearing the gunshot that killed the latter.

Following his death, his sister Mary A. LeBau Berger challenged his will. Estimated at $759,000, it was reported he left $120,000 to George Terry, and only $1,000 to his sister. She claimed, "that the writing was not his last will; that its execution was not his voluntary act, and that he was not of sound mind at the time he signed it." She alleged Terry attached himself to Cornelius in hopes of getting his money.

Vanderbilt left his recently finished mansion in Hartford, which he was supposed to move into a few weeks later, to his dearest friend Terry. With a mortgage of $25,000, and a lien placed on the house, Terry and Samuel I. Colt, a Providence Executor of the estate, decided to dispose of the house at a public sale. The public estate sale brought hundreds of people in from New York, Boston and elsewhere, the money raised from the sale went to pay Cornelius' debts. In December 1883, a lawsuit against Terry and Colt was brought forth by James O'Connor alleging he was owed $3,000 by Cornelius for gambling debts. The property was subdivided into 32 building lots, the mansion was torn down in 1918, and the property became part of the West Hill Historic District.
