= Cornelius Vanderbilt =

American business tycoon (1794–1877)

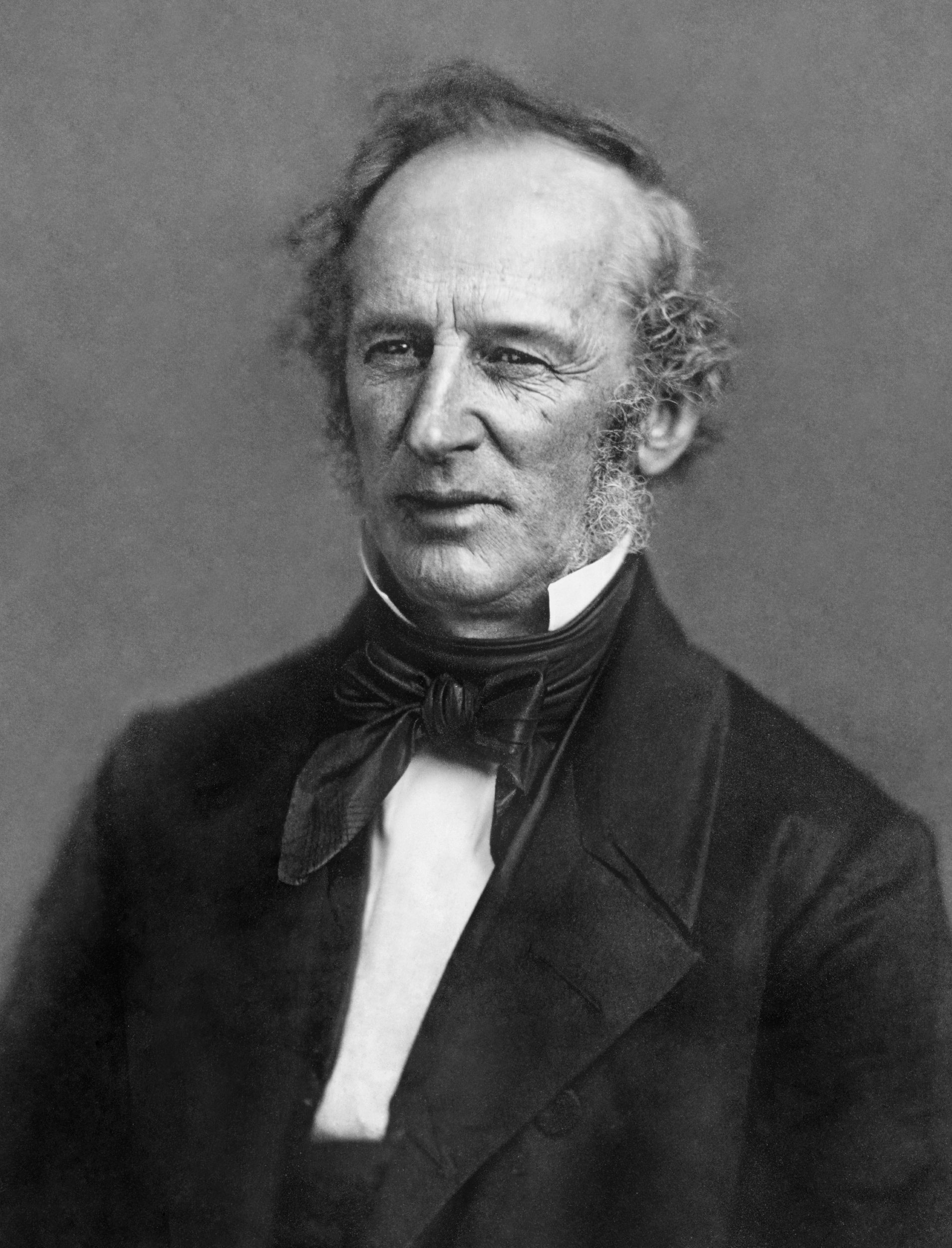
- Vanderbilt c. 1844–1860
- Born: May 27, 1794; New York City, U.S.
- Died: January 4, 1877 (aged 82); New York City, U.S.
- Burial place: Vanderbilt Family Cemetery and Mausoleum, Staten Island, New York, U.S.
- Occupation: Businessman
- Spouses: Sophia Johnson (m. 1813; died 1868) Frank Armstrong Crawford (m. 1869)
- Children: 13, including William Henry Vanderbilt
- Relatives: Vanderbilt family

Cornelius Vanderbilt (May 27, 1794 – January 4, 1877), nicknamed "the Commodore", was an American business magnate who built his wealth in railroads and shipping. After working with his father's business, he worked his way into leadership positions in inland and coastal shipping, then invested in the rapidly growing railroad industry, which transformed the geography of the United States.

As one of the richest Americans in history and wealthiest figures overall, Vanderbilt was the patriarch of the wealthy and influential Vanderbilt family. He provided the initial gift to found Vanderbilt University in Nashville, Tennessee. For his monopoly on shipping and the railroads, facilitated in part by political manipulation, Vanderbilt is often described as either a "captain of industry" or a "robber baron".

== Ancestry ==
Cornelius Vanderbilt's great-great-great-grandfather, Jan Aertson or Aertszoon ("Aert's son"), was a Dutch farmer from the village of De Bilt in Utrecht, Netherlands, who immigrated to New Amsterdam (later New York) as an indentured servant in 1650. The Dutch van der ("of the") was eventually added to Aertson's village name to create "van der Bilt" ("of the Bilt"). This was eventually condensed to Vanderbilt. Anthony Janszoon van Salee was one of Cornelius Vanderbilt's great-great-great-great-grandfathers.

== Early years ==
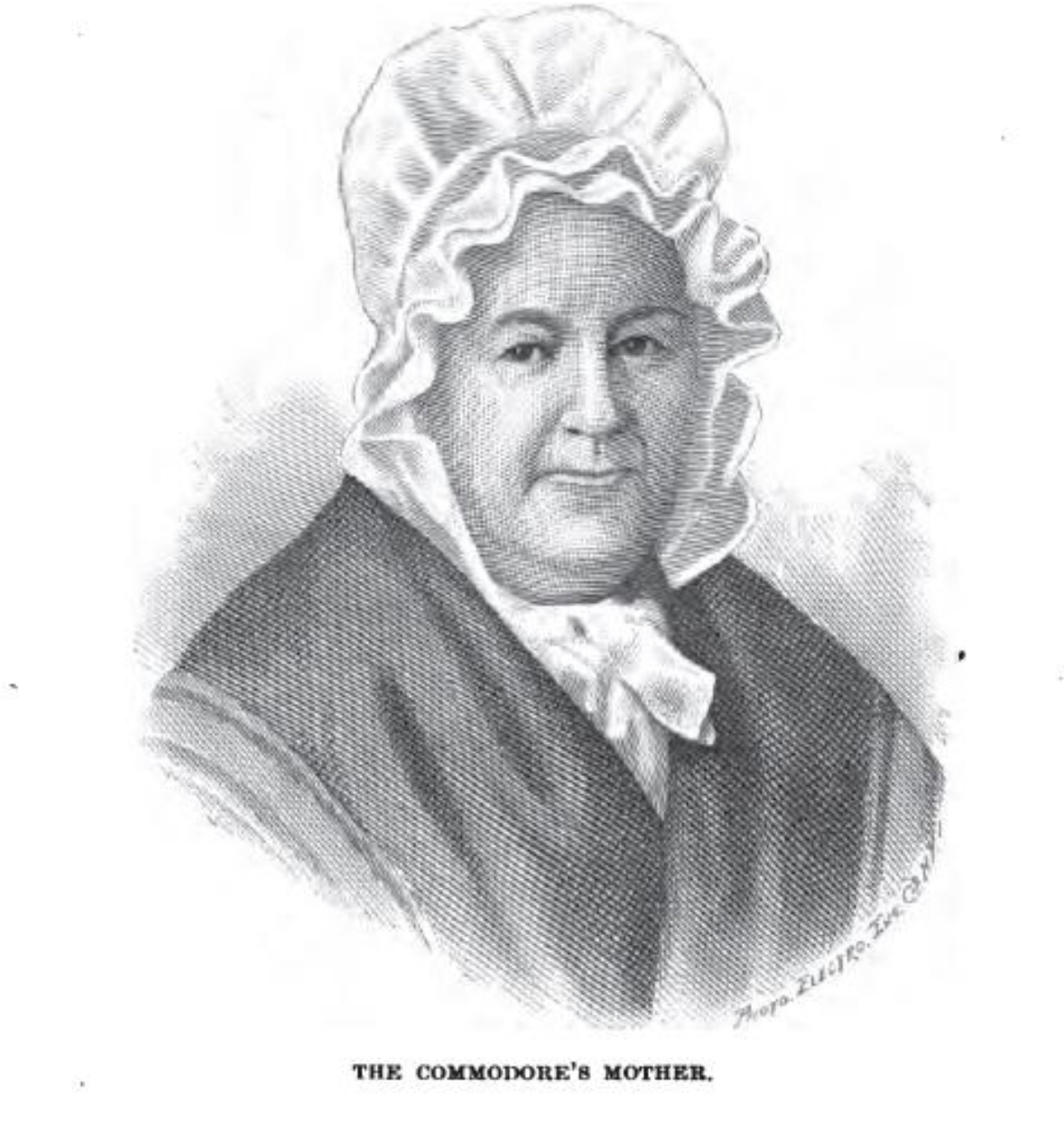
Vanderbilt's mother, Phebe Hand

Cornelius Vanderbilt was born in Staten Island, New York, on May 27, 1794, to Cornelius van Derbilt and Phebe Hand. He began working on his father's ferry in New York Harbor as a boy, quitting school at the age of 11. At the age of 16, Vanderbilt decided to start his own ferry service. According to one version of events, he borrowed $100 (equivalent to $2,100 in 2025) from his mother to purchase a periauger (a shallow draft, two-masted sailing vessel), which he christened the Swiftsure. However, according to the first account of his life, published in 1853, the periauger belonged to his father and the younger Vanderbilt received half the profit. He began his business by ferrying freight and passengers on a ferry between Staten Island and Manhattan. Such was his energy and eagerness in his trade that other captains nearby took to calling him "The Commodore" in jest—a nickname that stuck with him all his life.

While many Vanderbilt family members had joined the Episcopal Church, Cornelius Vanderbilt remained a member of the Moravian Church to his death. Along with other members of the Vanderbilt family, he helped erect a local Moravian parish church in his city.

On December 19, 1813, at age 19 Vanderbilt married his first cousin, Sophia Johnson. They moved into a boarding house on Broad Street in Manhattan.

They had 13 children together: Phebe in 1814, Ethelinda in 1817, Eliza in 1819, William in 1821, Emily in 1823, Sophia in 1825, Maria in 1827, Frances in 1828, Cornelius Jeremiah in 1830, George in 1832 (who died in 1836), Mary in 1834, Catherine in 1836, and another son named George in 1839.

In addition to running his ferry, Vanderbilt bought his brother-in-law John De Forest's schooner Charlotte and traded in food and merchandise in partnership with his father and others. But on November 24, 1817, a ferry entrepreneur named Thomas Gibbons asked Vanderbilt to captain his steamboat between New Jersey and New York. Although Vanderbilt kept his own businesses running, he became Gibbons's business manager.

When Vanderbilt entered his new position, Gibbons was fighting against a steamboat monopoly in New York waters, which had been granted by the New York State Legislature to the politically influential patrician Robert Livingston and Robert Fulton, who had designed the steamboat. Though both Livingston and Fulton had died by the time Vanderbilt started working for Gibbons, the monopoly was held by Livingston's heirs. They had granted a license to Aaron Ogden to run a ferry between New York and New Jersey. Gibbons launched his steamboat venture because of a personal dispute with Ogden, whom he hoped to drive into bankruptcy. To accomplish this, he undercut prices and also brought a landmark legal case—Gibbons v. Ogden—to the United States Supreme Court to overturn the monopoly.

Working for Gibbons, Vanderbilt learned to operate a large and complicated business. He moved with his family to New Brunswick, New Jersey, a stop on Gibbons' line between New York and Philadelphia. There his wife Sophia operated a very profitable inn, using the proceeds to feed, clothe and educate their children. Vanderbilt also proved a quick study in legal matters, representing Gibbons in meetings with lawyers. He also went to Washington, D.C., to hire Daniel Webster to argue the case before the Supreme Court. Vanderbilt appealed his own case against the monopoly to the Supreme Court, which was next on the docket after Gibbons v. Ogden. The Court never heard Vanderbilt's case, because on March 2, 1824, it ruled in Gibbons' favor, saying that states had no power to interfere with interstate commerce. The case is still considered a landmark ruling. The protection of competitive interstate commerce is considered the basis for much of the prosperity which the United States has generated.

== Steamboat entrepreneur ==
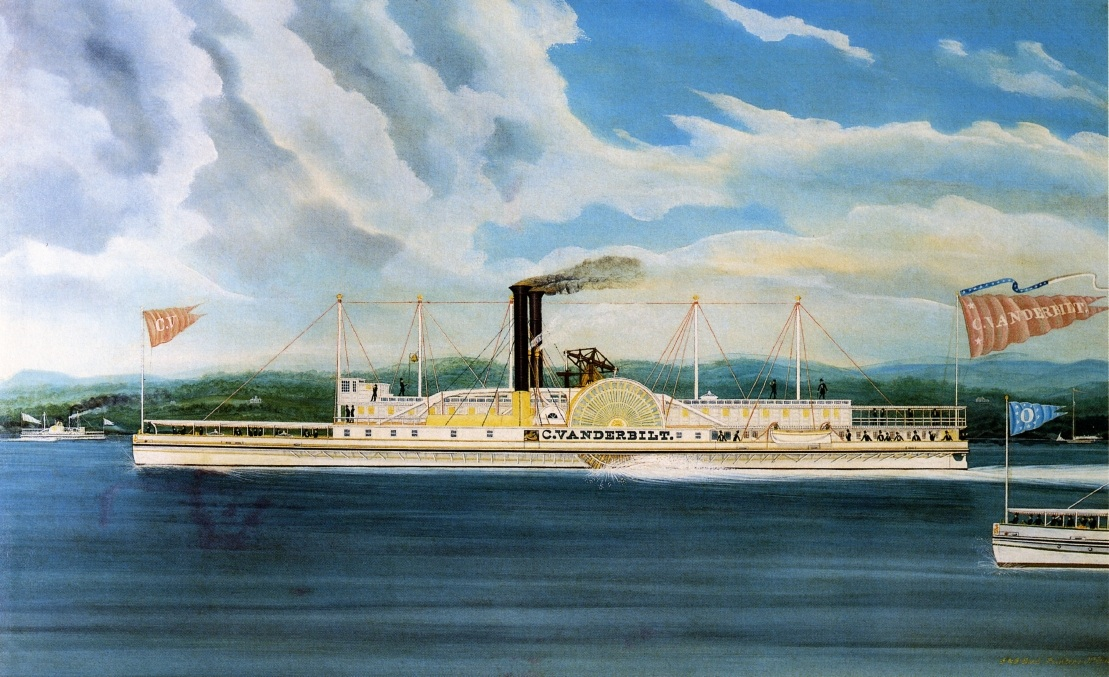
C. Vanderbilt, Hudson River steamer owned by Cornelius Vanderbilt (oil on canvas by James and John Bard)

After Thomas Gibbons died in 1826, Vanderbilt worked for Gibbons' son William until 1829. Though he had always run his own businesses on the side, he now worked entirely for himself. Step by step, he started lines between New York and the surrounding region. First he took over Gibbons' ferry to New Jersey, then switched to western Long Island Sound. In 1831, he took over his brother Jacob's line to Peekskill, New York, on the lower Hudson River. That year he faced opposition by a steamboat operated by Daniel Drew, who forced Vanderbilt to buy him out. Impressed, Vanderbilt became a secret partner with Drew for the next thirty years, so that the two men would have an incentive to avoid competing with each other.

On November 8, 1833, Vanderbilt was nearly killed in the Hightstown rail accident on the Camden and Amboy Railroad in New Jersey. Also on the train was president John Quincy Adams.

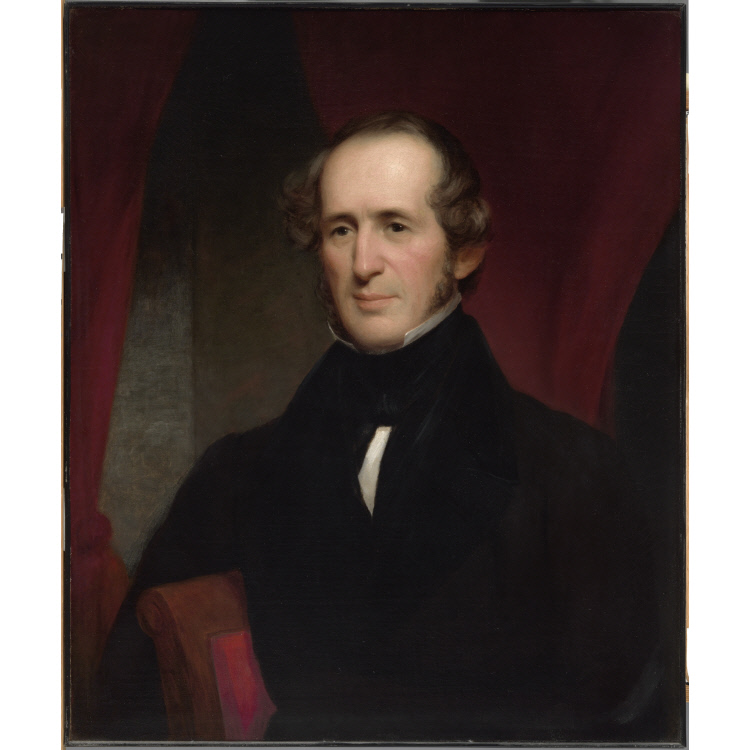
Portrait of Vanderbilt by Nathaniel Jocelyn in 1846

In 1834, Vanderbilt competed on the Hudson River against the Hudson River Steamboat Association, a steamboat monopoly between New York City and Albany. Using the name "The People's Line", he used the populist language associated with Democratic president Andrew Jackson to get popular support for his business. At the end of the year, the monopoly paid him a large amount to stop competing, and he switched his operations to Long Island Sound.

During the 1830s, textile mills were built in large numbers in New England as the United States developed its manufacturing base. Some of the first railroads in the United States were built from Boston to Long Island Sound, to connect with steamboats that ran to New York. By the end of the decade, Vanderbilt dominated the steamboat business on the Sound, and began to take over management of the connecting railroads. In the 1840s, he launched a campaign to take over the most attractive of these lines, the New York, Providence and Boston Railroad, popularly known as the Stonington. By cutting fares on competing lines, Vanderbilt drove down the Stonington stock price, and took over the presidency of the company in 1847. It was the first of the many railroads he would head.

During these years, Vanderbilt also operated many other businesses. He bought large amounts of real estate in Manhattan and Staten Island, and took over the Staten Island Ferry in 1838. It was in the 1830s when he was first referred to as "commodore", then the highest rank in the United States Navy. A common nickname for important steamboat entrepreneurs, by the end of the 1840s it was applied only to Vanderbilt.

== Oceangoing steamship lines ==
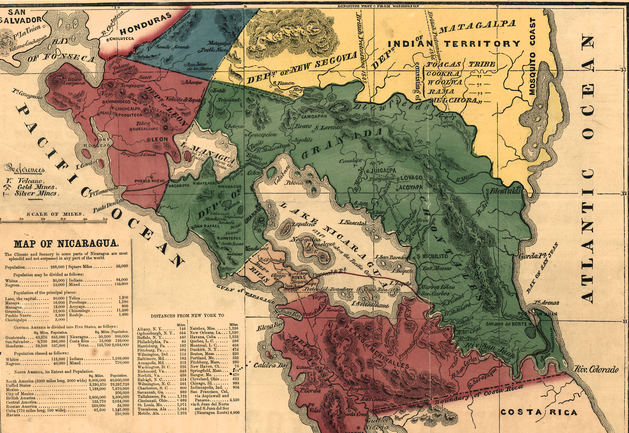
A map of Nicaragua in 1856

When the California gold rush began in 1849, Vanderbilt switched from regional steamboat lines to ocean-going steamships. Many of the migrants to California, and almost all of the gold returning to the East Coast, went by steamship to Panama, where mule trains and canoes provided transportation across the isthmus. (The Panama Railroad was soon built to provide a faster crossing.) Vanderbilt proposed a canal across Nicaragua, which was closer to the United States and was spanned most of the way across by Lake Nicaragua and the San Juan River. In the end, he could not attract enough investment to build the canal, but he did start a steamship line to Nicaragua, and founded the Accessory Transit Company to carry passengers across Nicaragua by steamboat on the lake and river, with a 12-mile (19-kilometer) carriage road between the Pacific port of San Juan del Sur and Virgin Bay on Lake Nicaragua.

In 1852, a dispute with Joseph L. White, a partner in the Accessory Transit Company, led to a business battle in which Vanderbilt forced the company to buy his ships for an inflated price. In early 1853, he took his family on a grand tour of Europe in his steamship yacht, the North Star. While he was away, White conspired with Charles Morgan, Vanderbilt's erstwhile ally, to betray him, and deny him money he was owed by the Accessory Transit Company. When Vanderbilt returned from Europe, he retaliated by developing a rival steamship line to California, cutting prices until he forced Morgan and White to pay him off.

He then turned to transatlantic steamship lines, running in opposition to the heavily subsidized Collins Line, headed by Edward K. Collins. Vanderbilt eventually drove the Collins Line into extinction. During the 1850s, Vanderbilt also bought control of a major shipyard and the Allaire Iron Works, a leading manufacturer of marine steam engines, in Manhattan.

In November 1855, Vanderbilt began to buy control of Accessory Transit once again. That same year, the American military adventurer, William Walker, led an expedition to Nicaragua and briefly took control of the government. Edmund Randolph, a close friend of Walker, coerced the Accessory Transit's San Francisco agent, Cornelius K. Garrison, into opposing Vanderbilt. Randolph convinced Walker to annul the charter of the Accessory Transit Company, and give the transit rights and company steamboats to him; Randolph sold these to Garrison. Garrison brought Charles Morgan in New York into the plan. Vanderbilt took control of the company just before these developments were announced. When he tried to convince the U.S. and English governments to help restore the company to its rights and property, they refused. So he negotiated with Costa Rica, which (along with the other Central American republics) had declared war on Walker. Vanderbilt sent a man to Costa Rica who led a raid that captured the steamboats on the San Juan River, cutting Walker off from his reinforcements from insurgent groups in the United States. Walker was forced to give up, and was driven out of the country by a U.S. Navy officer. But the new Nicaraguan government refused to allow Vanderbilt to restart the transit business, so he started a line by way of Panama, eventually developing a monopoly on the California steamship business.

== American Civil War ==
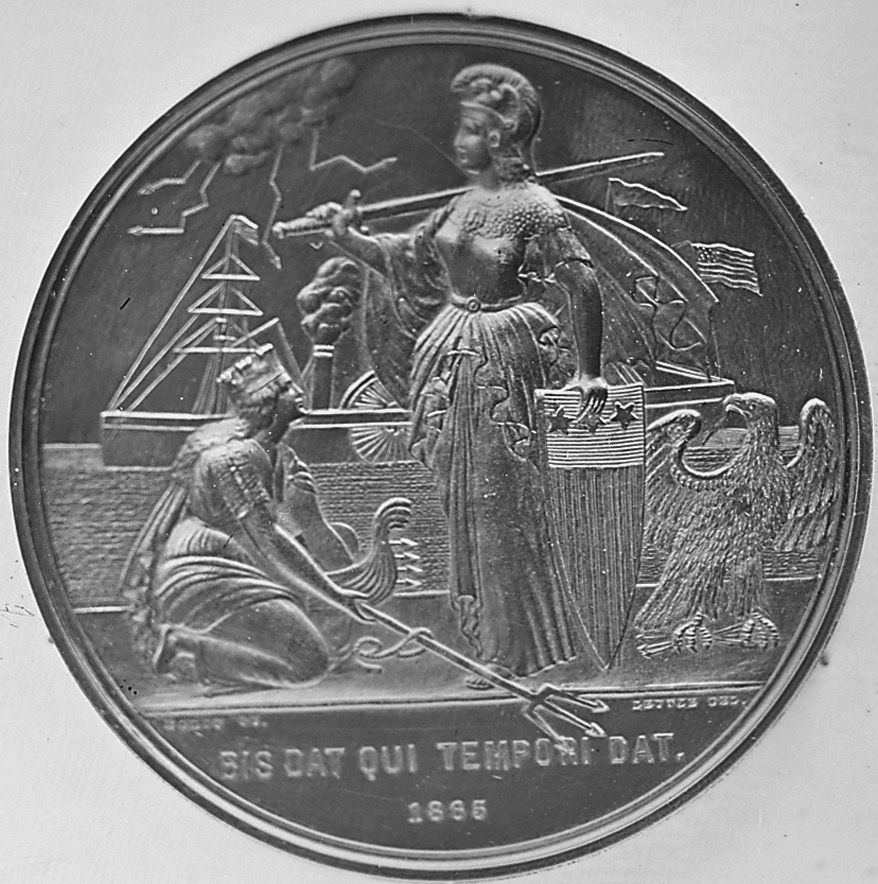
Cornelius Vanderbilt medal, United States Mint, 1865 with the steamship Vanderbilt in the background. In 2022 the medal was donated to Vanderbilt University by Cornelius Vanderbilt's great-great-great-grandson William H. Vanderbilt IV.

When the Civil War began in 1861, Vanderbilt attempted to donate his largest steamship, the Vanderbilt, to the Union Navy. Secretary of the Navy Gideon Welles refused it, thinking its operation and maintenance too expensive for what he expected to be a short war. Vanderbilt had little choice but to lease it to the War Department, at prices set by ship brokers. When the Confederate ironclad Virginia (popularly known in the North as the Merrimack) wrought havoc with the Union blockading squadron at Hampton Roads, Virginia, Secretary of War Edwin Stanton and President Abraham Lincoln called on Vanderbilt for help. This time he succeeded in donating the Vanderbilt to the Union Navy, equipping it with a ram and staffing it with handpicked officers. It helped bottle up the Virginia, after which Vanderbilt converted it into a cruiser to hunt for the Confederate commerce raider Alabama, captained by Raphael Semmes. For donating the Vanderbilt, he was awarded a Congressional Gold Medal. Vanderbilt also paid to outfit a major expedition to New Orleans. He suffered a grievous loss when George Washington Vanderbilt II, his youngest and favorite son, and heir apparent, a graduate of the United States Military Academy, fell ill and died without ever seeing combat.

== Railroad empire ==
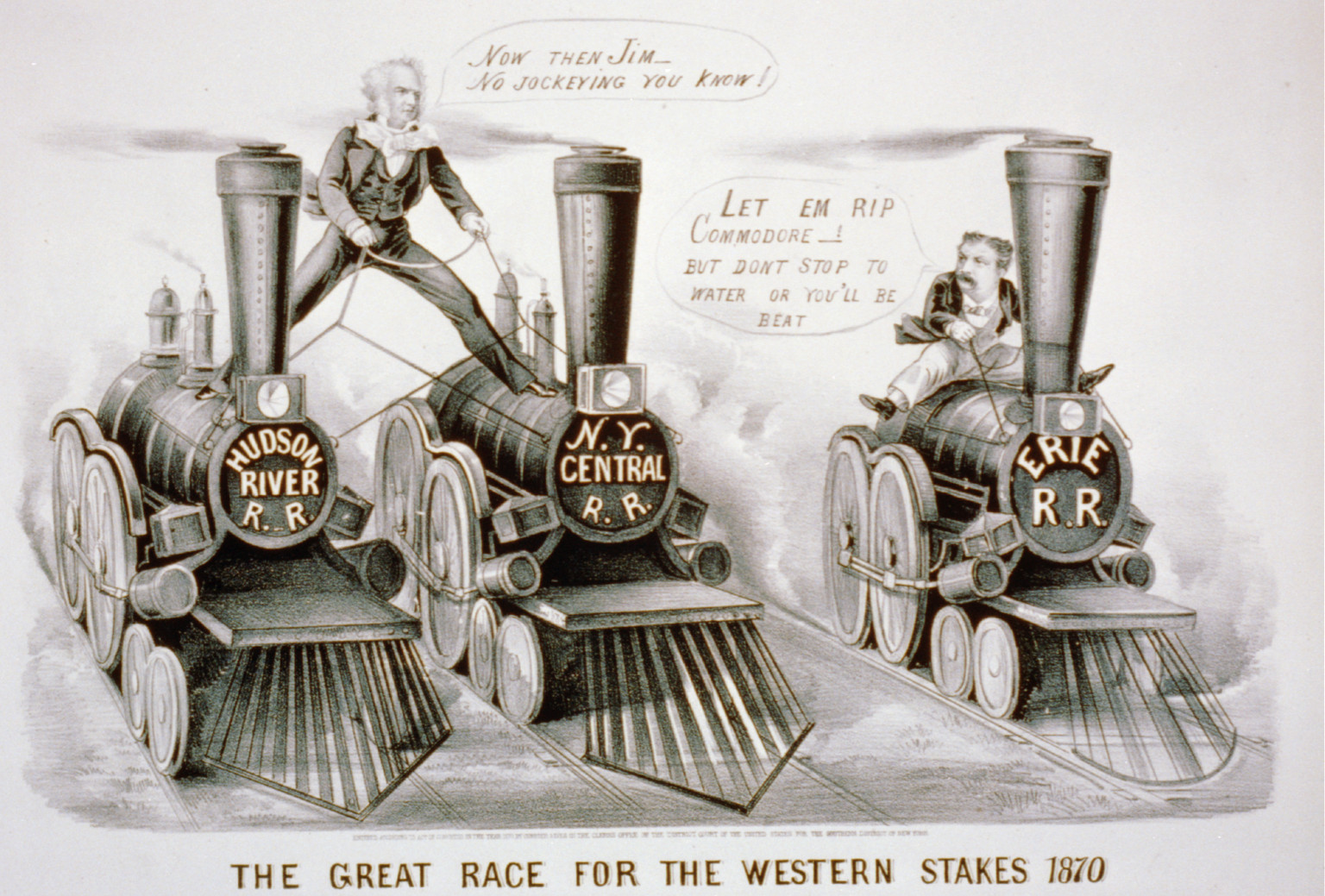
Cornelius Vanderbilt versus James Fisk Jr. in a famous rivalry with the Erie Railroad

=== New York and Harlem Railroad ===
Though Vanderbilt had relinquished his presidency of the Stonington Railroad during the California gold rush, he took an interest in several railroads during the 1850s, serving on the boards of directors of the Erie Railway, the Central Railroad of New Jersey, the Hartford and New Haven, and the New York and Harlem (popularly known as the Harlem). In 1863, Vanderbilt took control of the Harlem in a famous stockmarket corner, and was elected its president. He later explained that he wanted to show that he could take this railroad, which was generally considered worthless, and make it valuable. It had a key advantage: it was the only steam railroad to enter the center of Manhattan, running down 4th Avenue (later Park Avenue) to a station on 26th Street, where it connected with a horse-drawn streetcar line. From Manhattan it ran up to Chatham Four Corners, New York, where it had a connection to the railroads running east and west.

Vanderbilt brought his eldest son, Billy, in as vice-president of the Harlem. Billy had had a nervous breakdown early in life, and his father had sent him to a farm on Staten Island. But he proved himself a good businessman, and eventually became the head of the Staten Island Railway. Though the Commodore had once scorned Billy, he was impressed by his son's success. Eventually he promoted him to operational manager of all his railroad lines. In 1864, the Commodore sold his last ships, in order to concentrate on the railroads.

=== New York Central and Hudson River Railroad ===
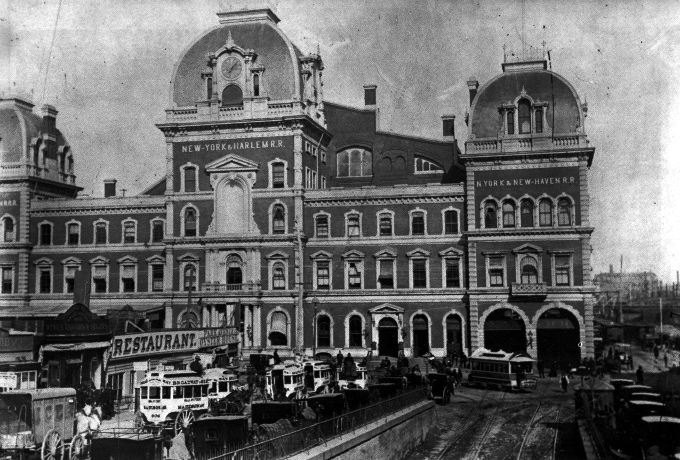
Looking out the north end of the Murray Hill Tunnel towards Grand Central Depot in 1880; note the labels for the New York, Harlem and New York, and New Haven Railroads; the New York Central and Hudson River was off to the left. The two larger portals on the right allowed some horse-drawn trains to continue further downtown.

Once in charge of the Harlem, Vanderbilt encountered conflicts with connecting lines. In each case, the strife ended in a battle that Vanderbilt won. He bought control of the Hudson River Railroad in 1864, the New York Central Railroad in 1867, and the Lake Shore and Michigan Southern Railway in 1869. He later bought the Canada Southern as well. In 1870, he consolidated two of his key lines into the New York Central and Hudson River Railroad, one of the first giant corporations in United States history.

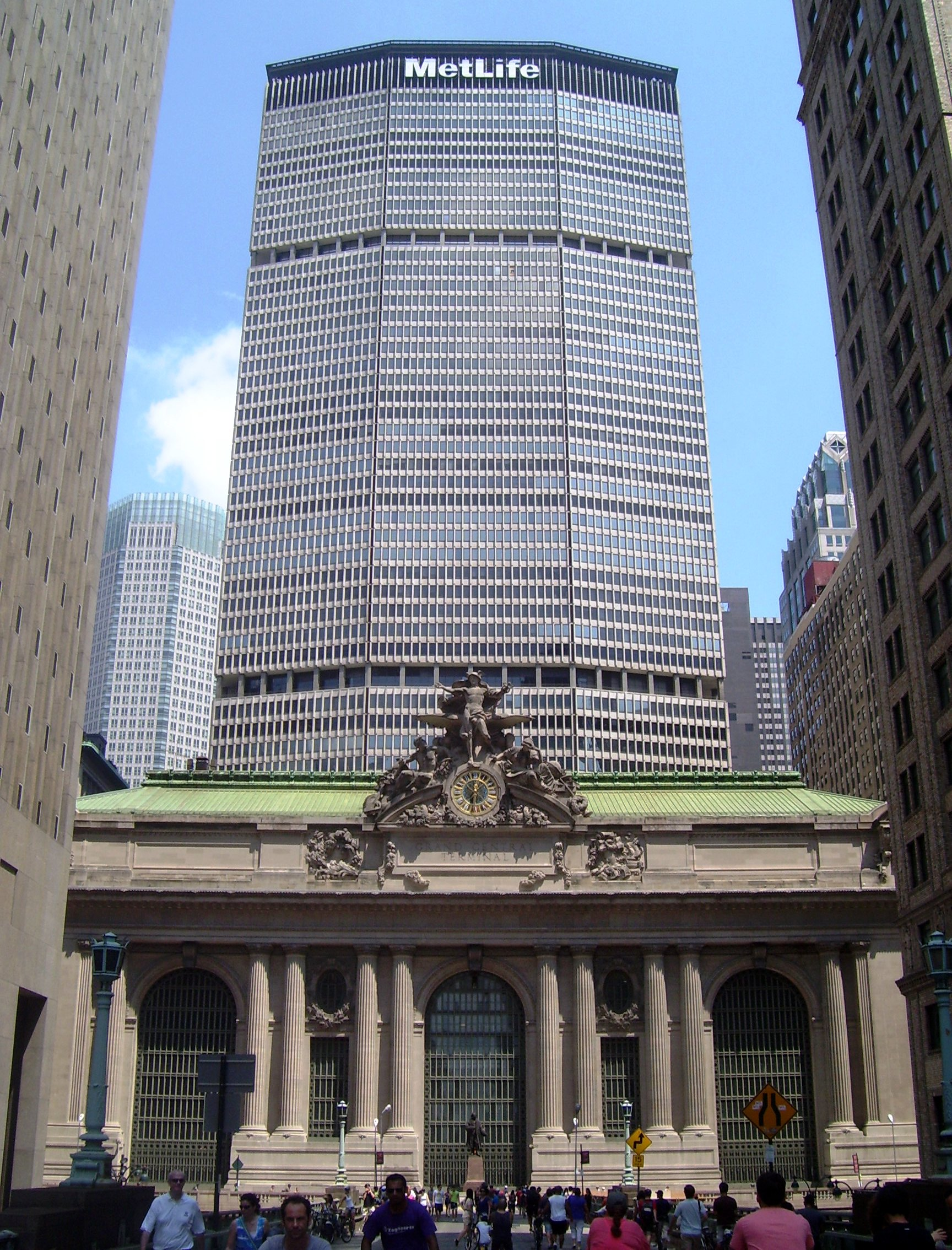
Grand Central Terminal below the MetLife Building in New York City, New York in 2012

=== Grand Central Depot ===
In 1869, Vanderbilt directed the Harlem to begin construction of the Grand Central Depot on 42nd Street in Manhattan. It was finished in 1871, and served as his lines' terminus in New York. He sank the tracks on 4th Avenue in a cut that later became a tunnel, and 4th Avenue became Park Avenue. The depot was replaced by Grand Central Terminal in 1913.

=== Rivalry with Jay Gould and James Fisk ===
In 1868, Vanderbilt fell into a dispute with Daniel Drew, who had become treasurer of the Erie Railway. To get revenge, he tried to corner Erie stock, which led to the so-called Erie War. This brought him into direct conflict with Jay Gould and financier James Fisk Jr., who had just joined Drew on the Erie board. They defeated the corner by issuing "watered stock" in defiance of state law, which restricted the number of shares a company could issue. But Gould bribed the legislature to legalize the new stock. Vanderbilt used the leverage of a lawsuit to recover his losses, but he and Gould became public enemies.

Gould never got the better of Vanderbilt in any other important business matter, but he often embarrassed Vanderbilt, who uncharacteristically lashed out at Gould in public. By contrast, Vanderbilt befriended his other foes after their fights ended, including Drew and Cornelius Garrison.

== Later years and philanthropy ==
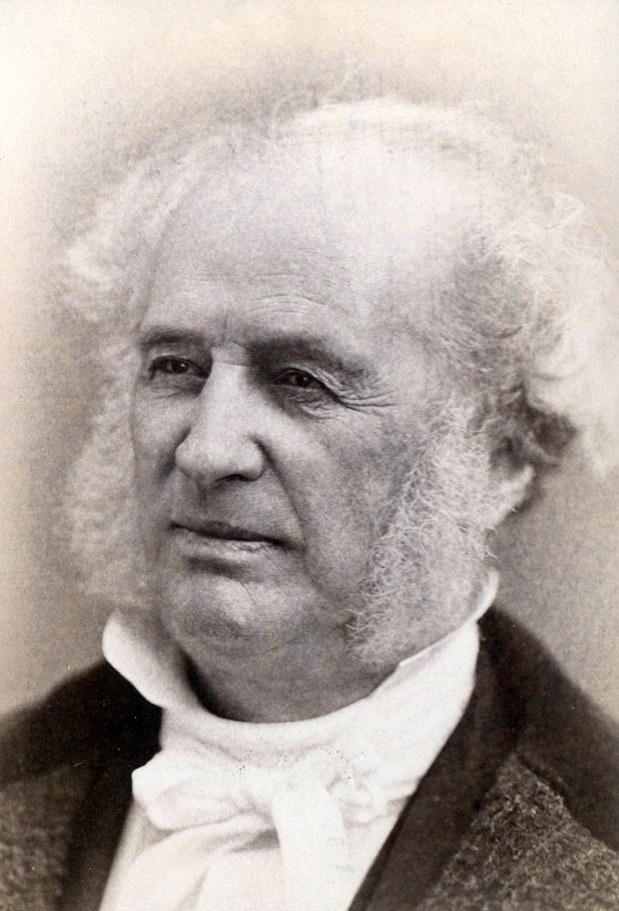
Vanderbilt in his final years

Following his wife Sophia's death in 1868, Vanderbilt went to Canada. On August 21, 1869, in London, Ontario, he married a cousin from Mobile, Alabama, with the name — unusual for a woman — of Frank Armstrong Crawford. Vanderbilt's second wife convinced him to give $1 million ($24,187,500 in 2025 dollars), the largest charitable gift in American history to that date, to Bishop Holland Nimmons McTyeire, the husband of her cousin, Amelia Townsend, to found Vanderbilt University in Nashville, Tennessee, named in his honor. He also paid $50,000 for a church for his second wife's congregation, the Church of the Strangers. In addition, he donated to churches around New York, including a gift to the Moravian Church on Staten Island of 8 1/2 acres (3 hectares) for a cemetery (the Moravian Cemetery). He chose to be buried there.

== Death ==
Cornelius Vanderbilt died on January 4, 1877, at his residence, No. 10 Washington Place, after being confined to his rooms for about eight months. The immediate cause of his death was exhaustion, brought on by long suffering from a complication of chronic disorders. At the time of his death, aged 82, Vanderbilt had an estimated worth of $105 million ($3,174,609,375 in 2025 dollars).

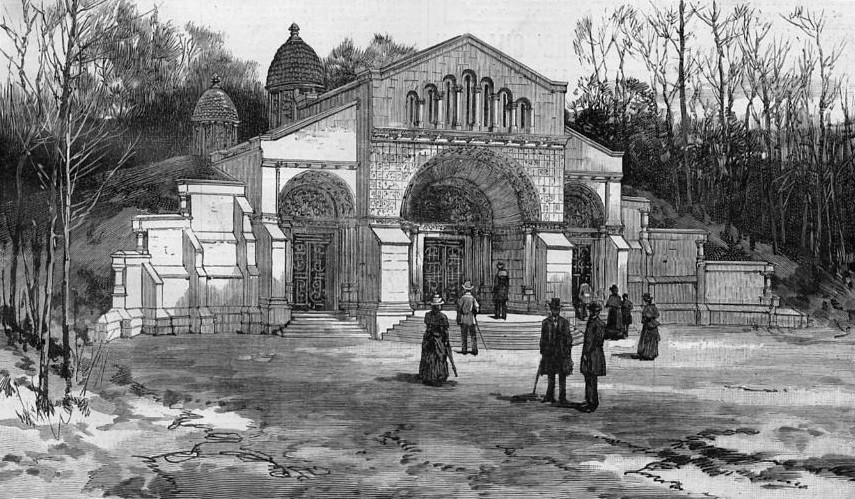
Vanderbilt family mausoleum at the Moravian Cemetery on Staten Island, where Cornelius is buried

In his will, he left 95% of his $105 million estate to his son William (Billy) and four grandsons through him. This left his only other living son, Cornelius Jeremiah Vanderbilt, and 9 daughters (Phebe Jane, Ethelinda, Eliza, Emily Almira, Sophia Johnson, Maria Louisa, Frances Lavinia, Mary Alicia, and Catherine Juliette), to receive comparatively little inheritance; far less than even their young nephews. Corneel, Ethelinda and Mary took the matter of their father's will to court, claiming he was not in his right mind in his old age when he drew up the will; that he had been behaving strangely and was under William's influence as well as that of a corrupt spiritualist in his employ, who'd allegedly been approached and paid off by William to do his bidding, according to eyewitness testimony. Allegedly, William paid the spiritualist (a Mr. Stoddard) to suggest the "spirits"—during a point in the session when said spiritualist would fall into a "trance" in the Commodore's presence—claimed William would be the most trustworthy to inherit the estate and business and that his other children actually hated him and were just waiting for him to die. A "spirit", during this session, came in the form of William's deceased mother, Sophia. Not wanting to risk further public humiliation of the family name in court, William finally settled with his siblings. He gave Corneel an extra $200,000 in cash and a trust fund of $400,000. He gave Mary and Ethelinda the same settlement. Still, all told, this was comparatively very little from the—by far—largest estate in the world at that time.

William's eldest son, Cornelius Vanderbilt II, received $5 million in the will, while his three younger sons—William Kissam Vanderbilt, Frederick William Vanderbilt, and George Washington Vanderbilt II—received $2 million apiece. Vanderbilt willed amounts ranging from $250,000 to $500,000 to each of his daughters. His wife received $500,000, their New York City home, and 2,000 shares of common stock in the New York Central Railroad. To his younger surviving son, Cornelius Jeremiah Vanderbilt, whom he regarded as a wastrel, he left the income from a $200,000 trust fund. (Although his daughters and Cornelius received bequests much smaller than those of their brother William, these made them very wealthy by the standards of 1877 and were not subject to inheritance tax.)

== Legacy ==
Statues of Cornelius Vanderbilt

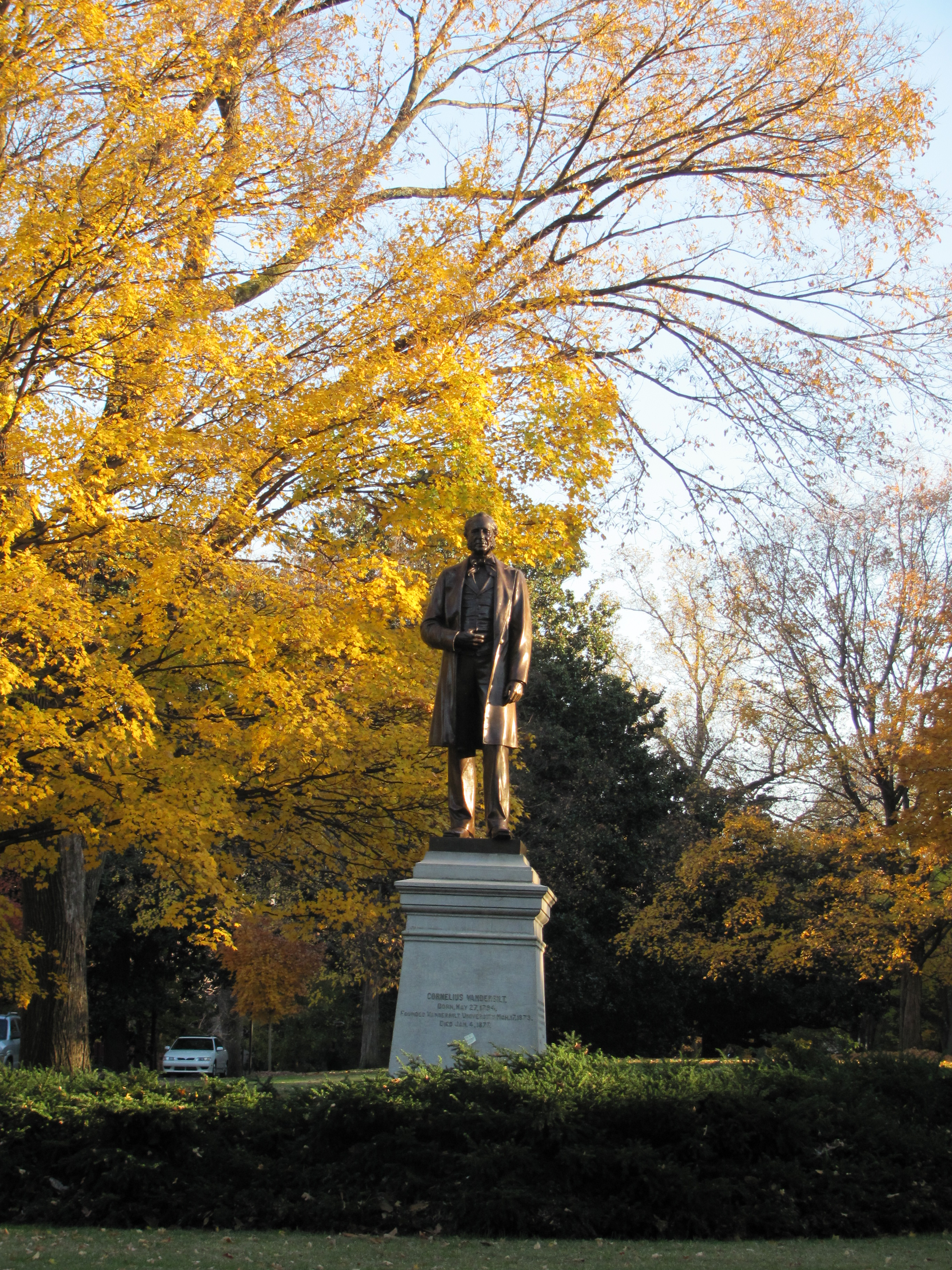
Statue at Vanderbilt University

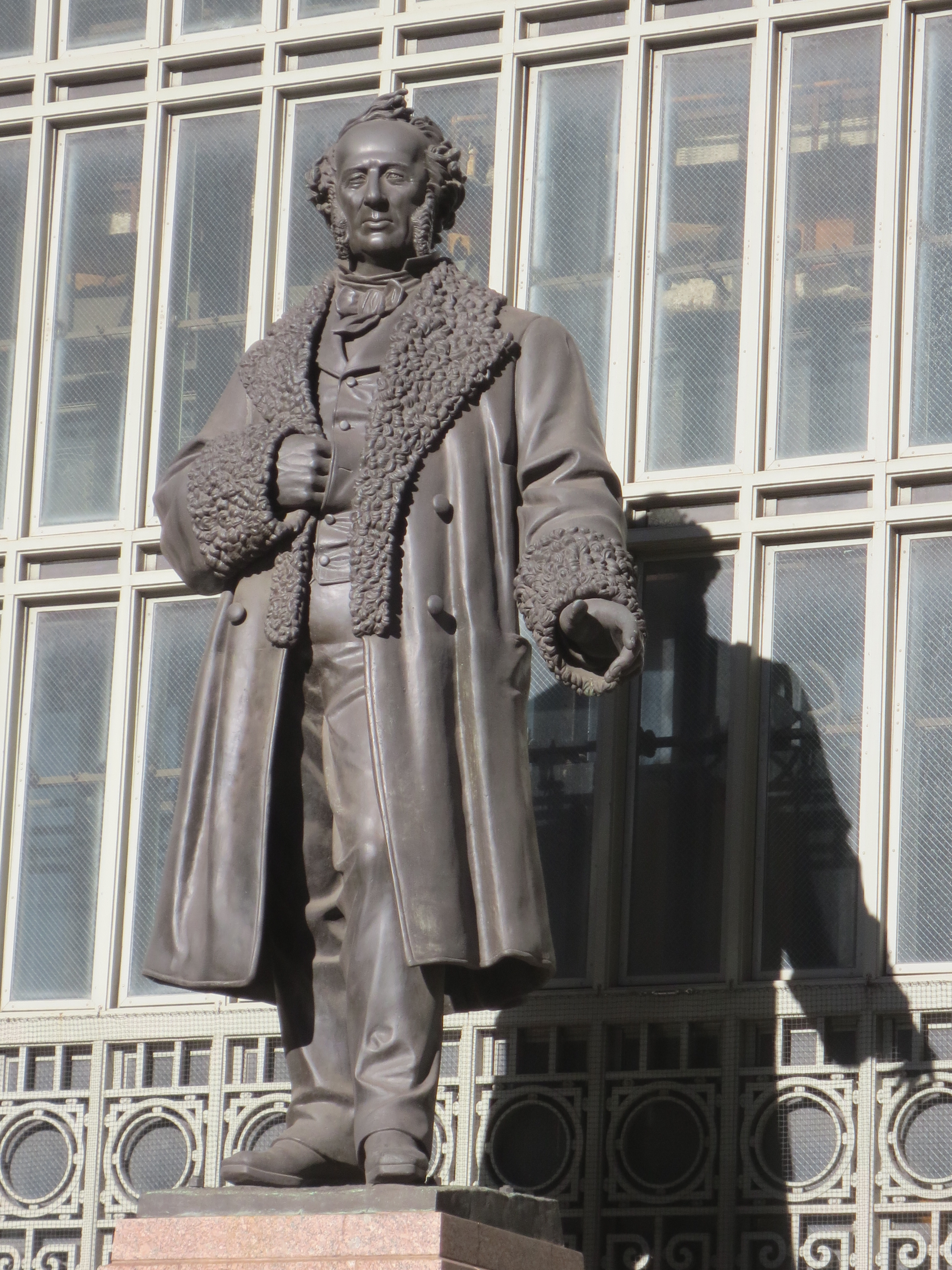
Statue at Grand Central Terminal

Vanderbilt's biographer T. J. Stiles says, "He vastly improved and expanded the nation's transportation infrastructure, contributing to a transformation of the very geography of the United States. He embraced new technologies and new forms of business organization, and used them to compete....He helped to create the corporate economy that would define the United States into the 21st century."

The Commodore had lived in relative modesty considering his nearly unlimited means, splurging only on race horses. His descendants were the ones who built the Vanderbilt houses that characterize the United States' Gilded Age.

According to The Wealthy 100 by Michael Klepper and Robert Gunther, Vanderbilt would be worth $143 billion in 2007 United States dollars if his total wealth as a share of the nation's gross domestic product (GDP) in 1877 (the year of his death) were taken and applied in that same proportion in 2007. This would make him the second-wealthiest person in United States history, after Standard Oil co-founder John Davison Rockefeller (1839–1937). (Note: Fortune estimated his wealth at death at $105,000,000 ($3.17 billion in 2025 adjusted for inflation), or 1/87 of the nation's GDP.) Another calculation, from 1998, puts him in third place, after Andrew Carnegie. In real terms, however, Vanderbilt's peak wealth of $105 million in 1877 is only worth US$3.17 billion (in 2025 dollars).

In 1999, Cornelius Vanderbilt was inducted into the North America Railway Hall of Fame, recognizing his significant contributions to the railroad industry. He was inducted in the "Railway Workers & Builders: North America" category.

Statues of Cornelius Vanderbilt can be found at various locations, including Vanderbilt University and Grand Central Terminal. At Vanderbilt University, a statue of Cornelius Vanderbilt, designed by Giuseppe Moretti in 1897, stands near Kirkland Hall in commemoration of his gift to help found the university. Additionally, a statue of Cornelius Vanderbilt is located on the south side of Grand Central Terminal, facing the Park Avenue road viaduct to the south. The 8 1/2-foot-tall (2.6-meter) bronze statue was sculpted by Ernst Plassmann and was originally sited at the Hudson River Railroad depot at St. John's Park before being moved to Grand Central Terminal in 1929.

== Descendants ==
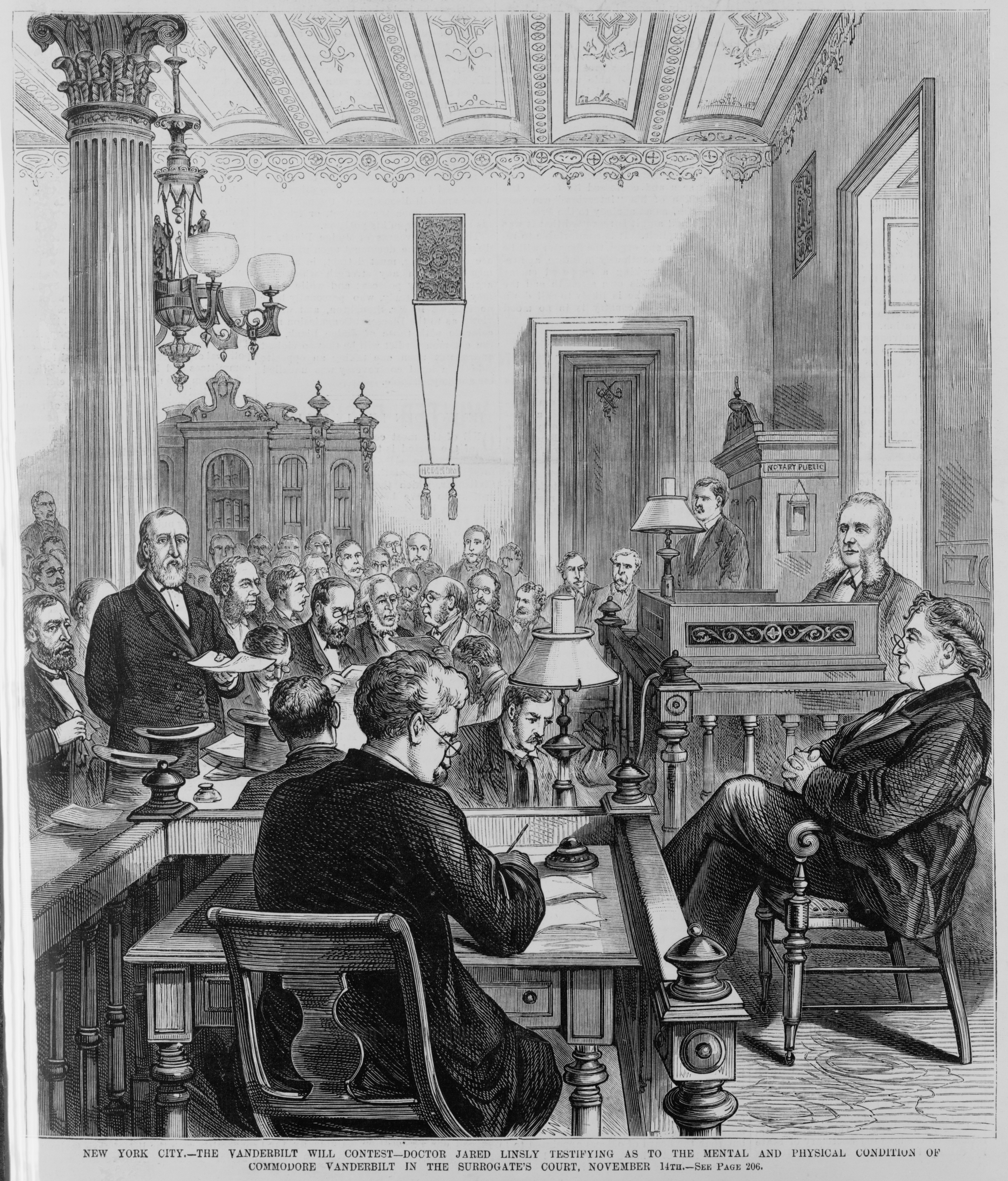
Physician Jared Linsly testifying as to the mental and physical condition of Cornelius Vanderbilt during court proceedings surrounding the challenge to his will. From an 1877 illustration in Harper's Weekly.

Cornelius Vanderbilt was buried in the family vault in the Moravian Cemetery at New Dorp on Staten Island. He was later reburied in a tomb in the same cemetery constructed by his son Billy. Three of his daughters and son, Cornelius Jeremiah Vanderbilt, contested the will on the grounds that their father was of unsound mind and under the influence of his son Billy and spiritualists whom he consulted on a regular basis. The court battle lasted more than a year and was ultimately won outright by Billy, who increased the bequests to his siblings and paid their legal fees.

One of Vanderbilt's great-great-granddaughters, Gloria Vanderbilt, was a renowned fashion designer, and her youngest son, Anderson Cooper, is a television news anchor. Through Billy's daughter Emily Thorn Vanderbilt, another descendant is actor Timothy Olyphant.

Cornelius Jeremiah Vanderbilt was childless when he committed suicide, in 1882, and George Washington Vanderbilt died during the Civil War, before having any children. All of the Vanderbilt multimillionaires descend through the oldest son Billy and his wife.

Cornelius' youngest grandson through William, George Washington Vanderbilt II, built the 250-room Biltmore Estate in the mountains of Asheville, North Carolina, as his main residence with part of his inheritance from his grandfather. It still retains the title of the largest privately owned home in the United States, though it is open to the public. The mansion contains 178,926 square feet (16,622.8 square meters) of total floor space and originally sat on 125,000 acres (50,600 hectares) of land. It now sits on 8,000 acres (3,200 ha) due to George's final wishes that 86,000 acres (35,000 ha) be sold to the government at $5 per acre ($12/ha)—a significantly cut rate and what George had originally paid—in order to form the core of the Pisgah National Forest. George's widow Edith Stuyvesant Vanderbilt Gerry also had to sell off additional land to pay for the estate's upkeep.

== In popular culture ==
- Vanderbilt's career is highlighted in the History Channel's 2012 miniseries docudrama The Men Who Built America.

== Railroads controlled by Vanderbilt ==
- New York and Harlem Railroad (1863–)
- Hudson River Railroad (1864–)
- New York Central Railroad (1868–)
- Canada Southern Railway (1873–)
- Lake Shore and Michigan Southern Railway (1873?–)
- Michigan Central Railroad (1877–)
- New York, Chicago and St. Louis Railroad (Nickel Plate Road, 1882–)
- West Shore Railroad (1885–)
- Rome, Watertown and Ogdensburg Railroad
- Dunkirk, Allegheny Valley and Pittsburgh Railroad
- Cleveland, Cincinnati, Chicago and St. Louis Railway
- Lake Erie and Western Railroad
- Pittsburgh and Lake Erie Railroad

== See also ==
- Tennessee Celeste Claflin, mistress of Cornelius Vanderbilt in later life
- List of railroad executives
- List of richest Americans in history
