= Gunther Building =

The Gunther Building may refer to one of the following:

- Gunther Building (Broome Street), New York City
- Gunther Building (Fifth Avenue), New York City

== See also ==
- Gunter Building, North Carolina
