= Broome Street =

Street in Manhattan, New York

Coordinates: 40°43′9.12″N 73°59′38.07″W

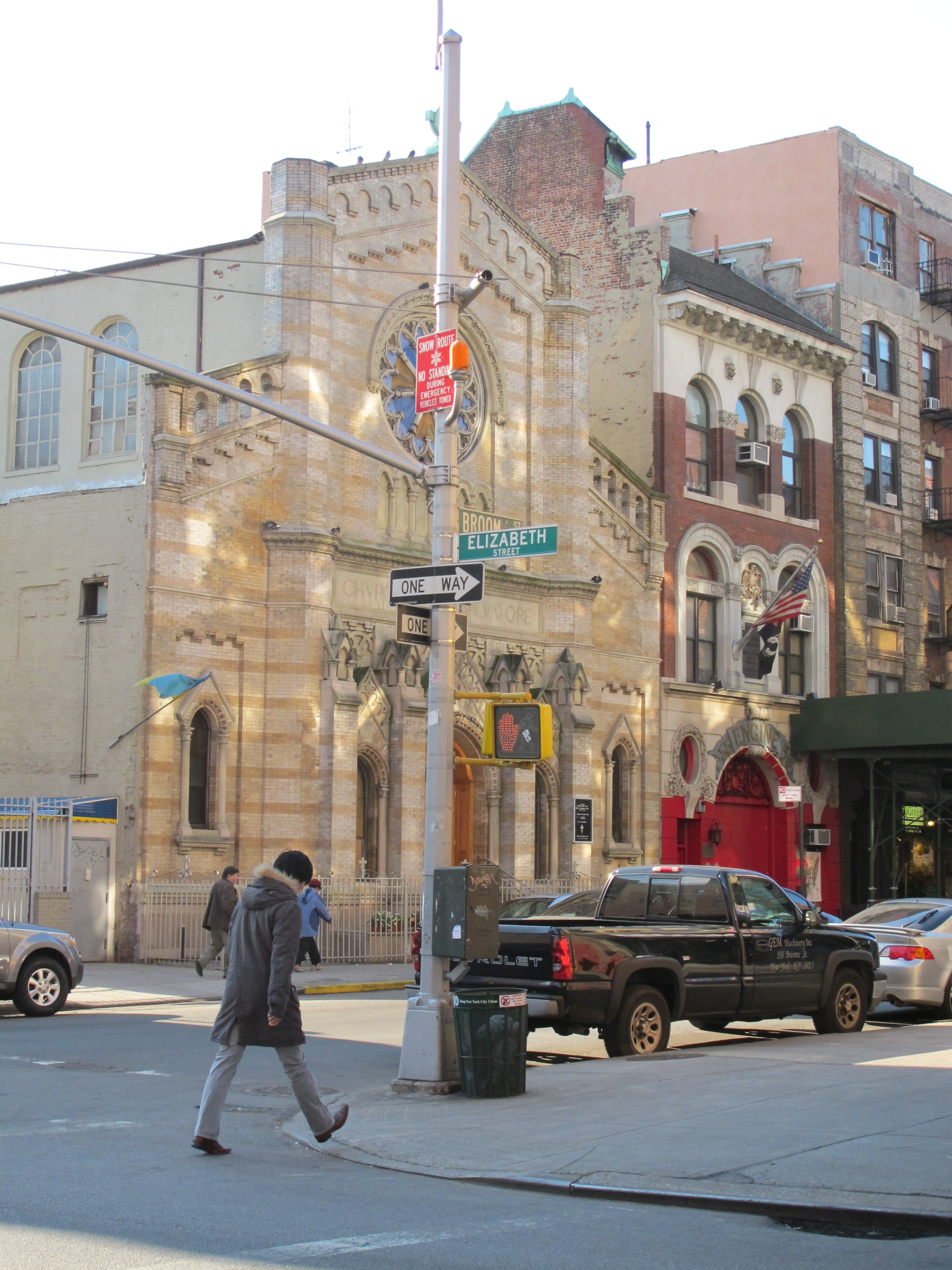
Broome and Elizabeth Streets

Broome Street is an east–west street in Lower Manhattan. It runs nearly the full width of Manhattan island, from Hudson Street in the west to Lewis Street in the east, near the entrance to the Williamsburg Bridge. The street is interrupted in a number of places by parks, buildings, and Allen Street's median. The street was named after Staten Island-born John Broome, who was a Colonial merchant and politician and became a Lieutenant Governor of New York State.

== History ==
According to a map sourced from the New York Public Library collection, the area around Broome Street was developed in the first decade of the 1800s as part of the neighborhood known at that time as 'New Delaney's Square,' although this is probably a mistake for "Delancey," as the Delancey family had owned the land for many decades and had already begun planning development in the 1760s.

The street is named after John Broome, an early city alderman and lieutenant governor of New York in 1804. The architecture along the street is distinctive for its use of cast iron and is strongly influenced by Griffith Thomas, who designed several buildings along Broome Street, including the Gunther Building. The Our Lady of Vilnius Church stood in the street between 1910 and 2015.

As part of an experiment, in 1948, Broome Street west of Chrystie Street was converted to a one-way westbound street. In the 1960s, as the city was going through massive urban renewal and revitalization projects, Broome Street became the proposed route for the Lower Manhattan Expressway, designed by Robert Moses. Had the construction been carried out, the ten-lane elevated highway would have completely replaced the street, along with all of the buildings on its north side, many of which are now land-marked as part of the historic cast-iron district. However, protests opposing the project led by Jane Jacobs gained enough momentum to stop the project from going forward.

330 Broome Street was the address of the A's art space.

== Trivia ==
Steve Buscemi was a firefighter with FDNY Engine 55 at 363 Broome Street.
