= 935–939 Broadway =

Building in Manhattan, New York

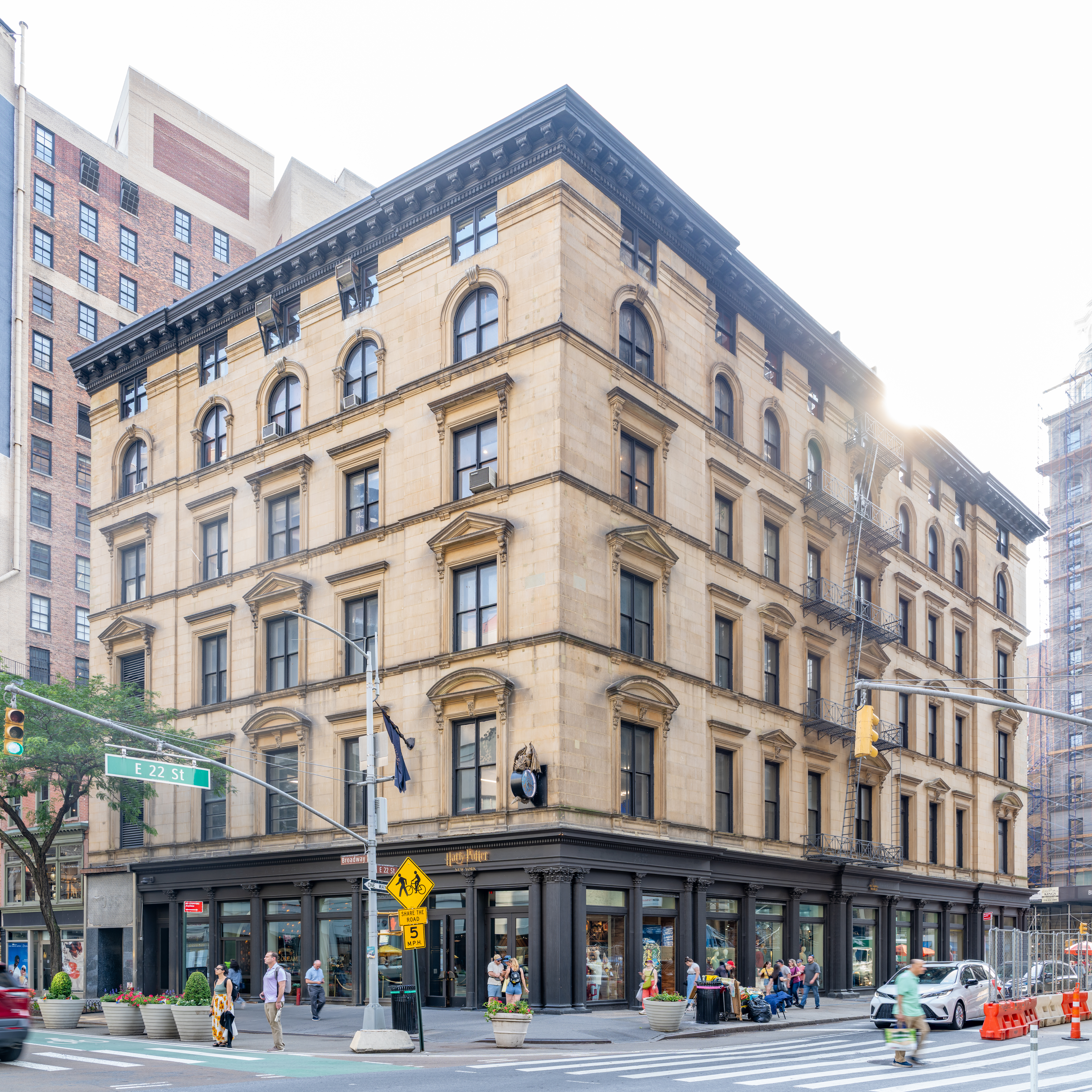
- 935–939 Broadway (also known as 159–161 Fifth Avenue), as seen from Broadway and 22nd Street

General information
- Architectural style: Italianate style
- Location: 935–939 Broadway; Manhattan, New York City
- Coordinates: 40.7404719°N 73.9897151°W
- Completed: 1862
- Client: Richard Mortimer

Design and construction
- Architect: Griffith Thomas

935–939 Broadway is a six-story Italianate brownstone structure designed by the architect Griffith Thomas in the Flatiron District of Manhattan, New York City.

== History ==
The six-story Italianate building, commissioned by Richard Mortimer, was built between 1861–1862 and was designed by architect Griffith Thomas. Throughout its lifetime, the structure has been referred to as the Mortimer Building, the Albert Building, and the Glenham Hotel. Early tenants include Bryant, Stratton & Packard's New York City Business College and the J.&C. Johnston Dry Goods company that opened in 1881. The building originally had five stories and a sixth story was added in 1919 by the architects Rouse & Goldstone.

=== Glenham Hotel ===
Conflicting information exists that refers to this building as the former Glenham Hotel. The Glenham Hotel however has been listed as 153 and 155 Fifth Avenue, now the address of the adjacent Scribner Building.

On April 2, 1882, 51-year-old Cornelius Jeremiah Vanderbilt committed suicide in his fifth floor room, number 80, by firing his Smith & Wesson revolver into his left temple.

In 2021, the building began hosting the site of the first official Wizarding World and Harry Potter flagship store in New York City, now simply referred to as "Harry Potter New York".

== Gallery ==
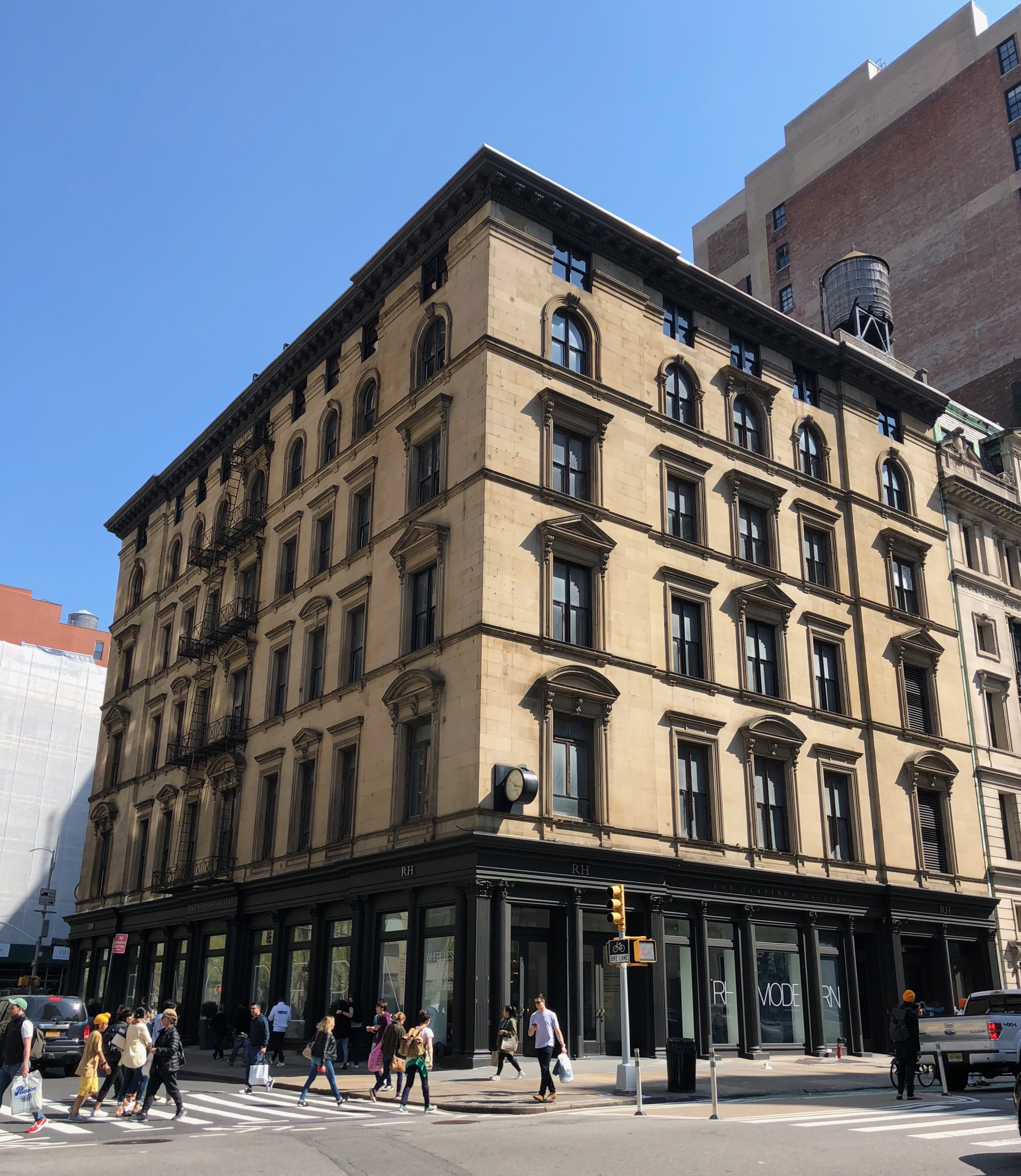
As seen from 5th Avenue and 22nd Street

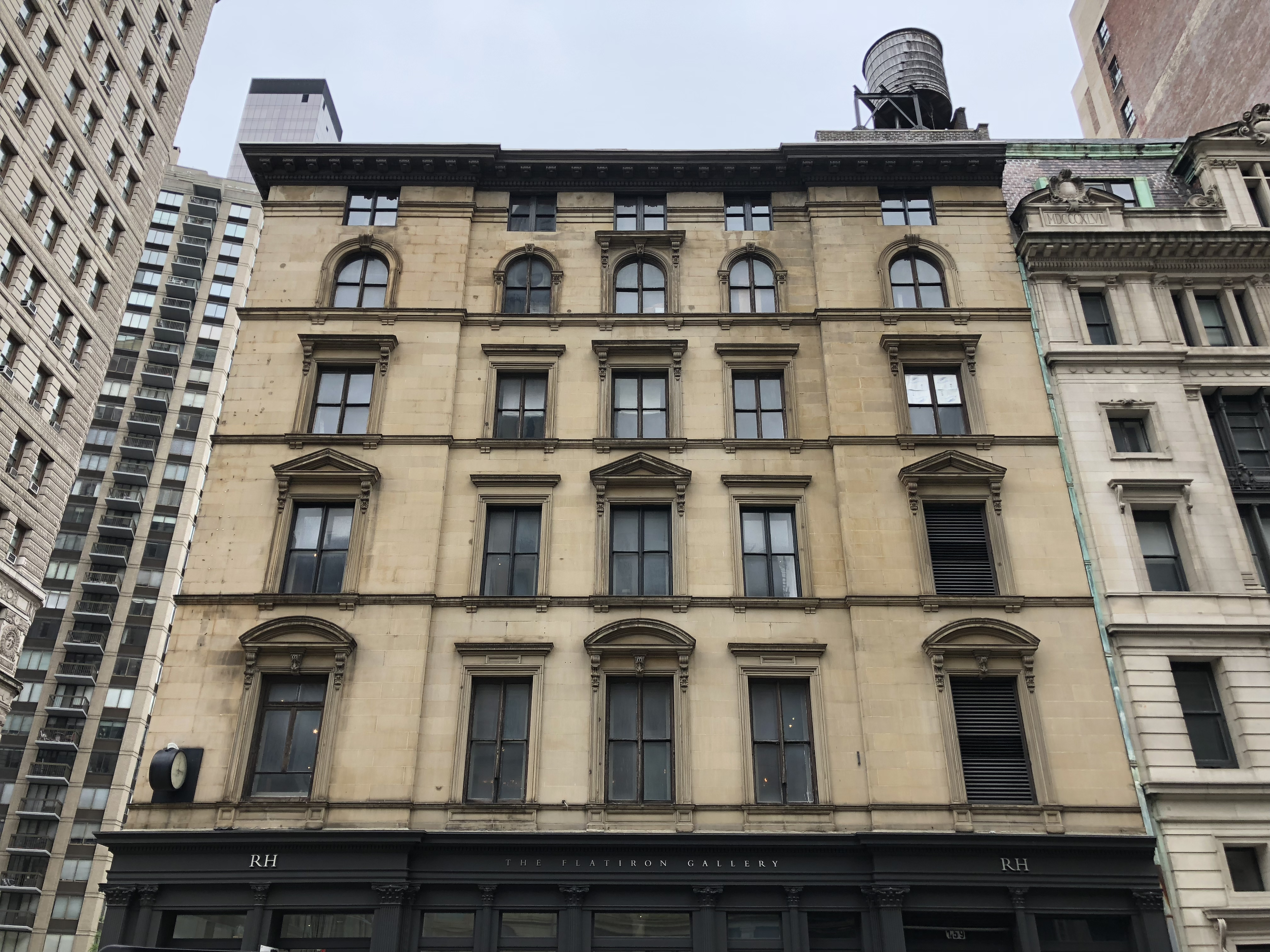
Exterior view facing 5th Avenue

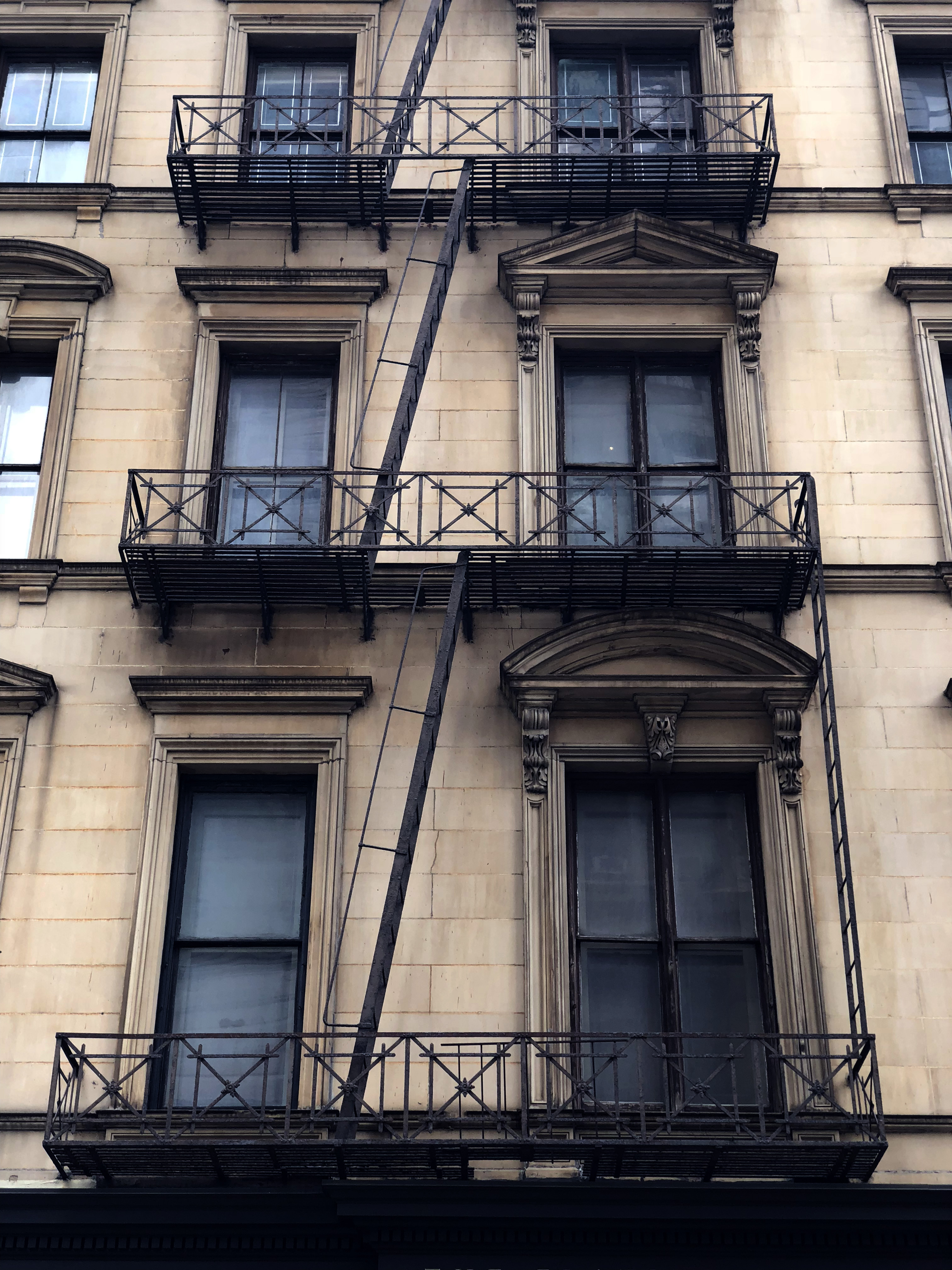
View of the fire escape

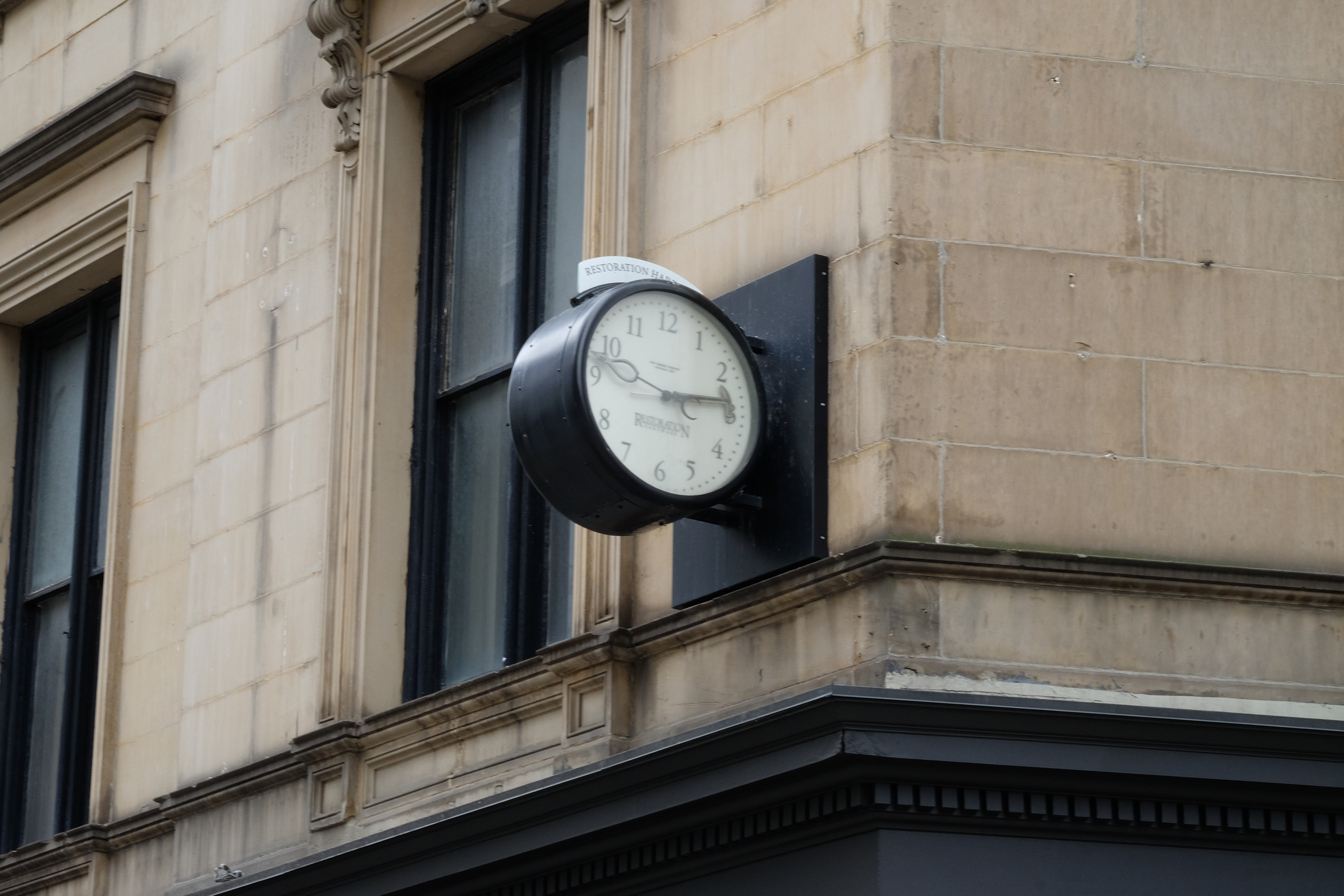
View of the clock mounted on the facade at the northeast corner

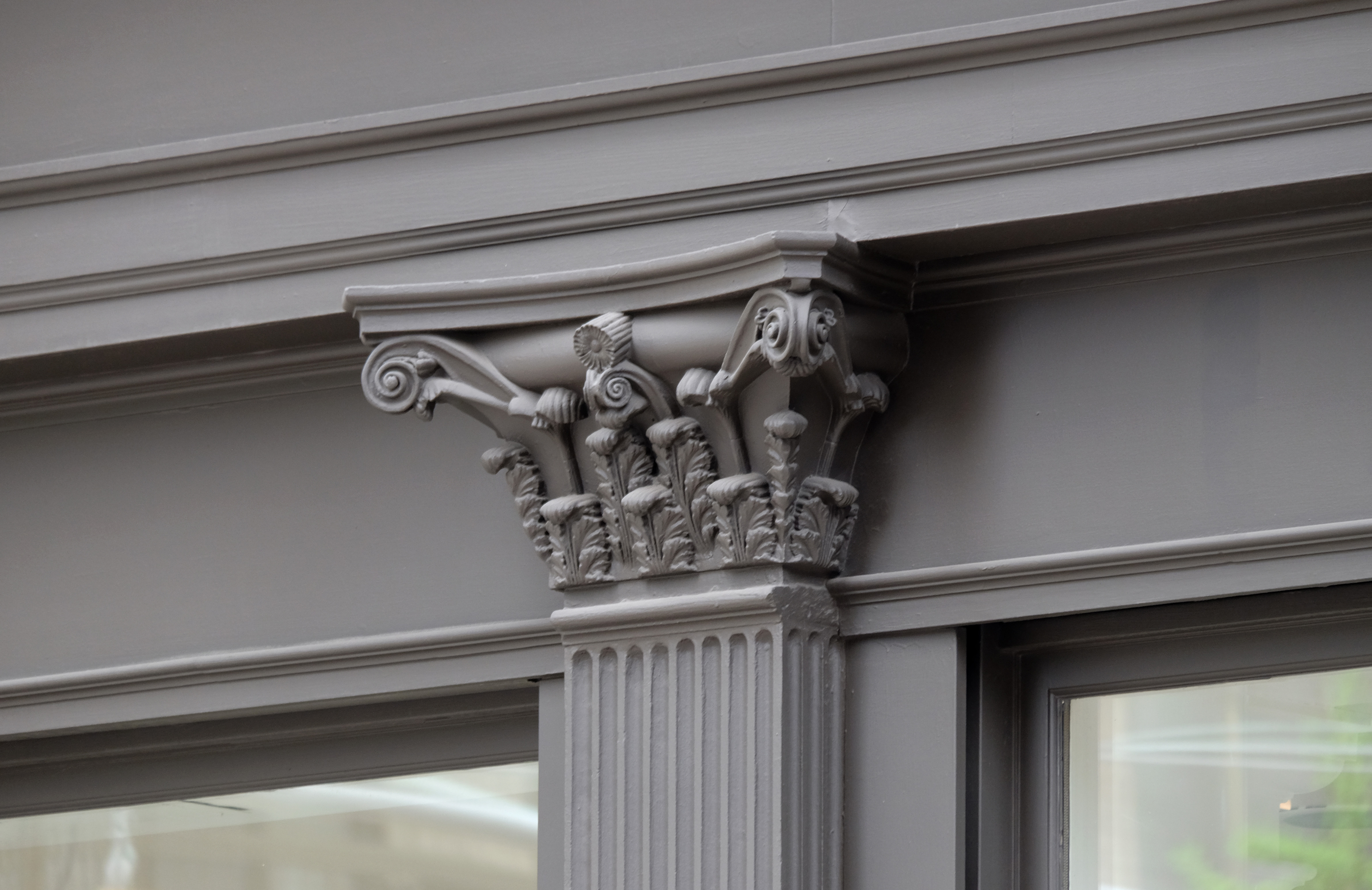
Capital detail at the ground floor

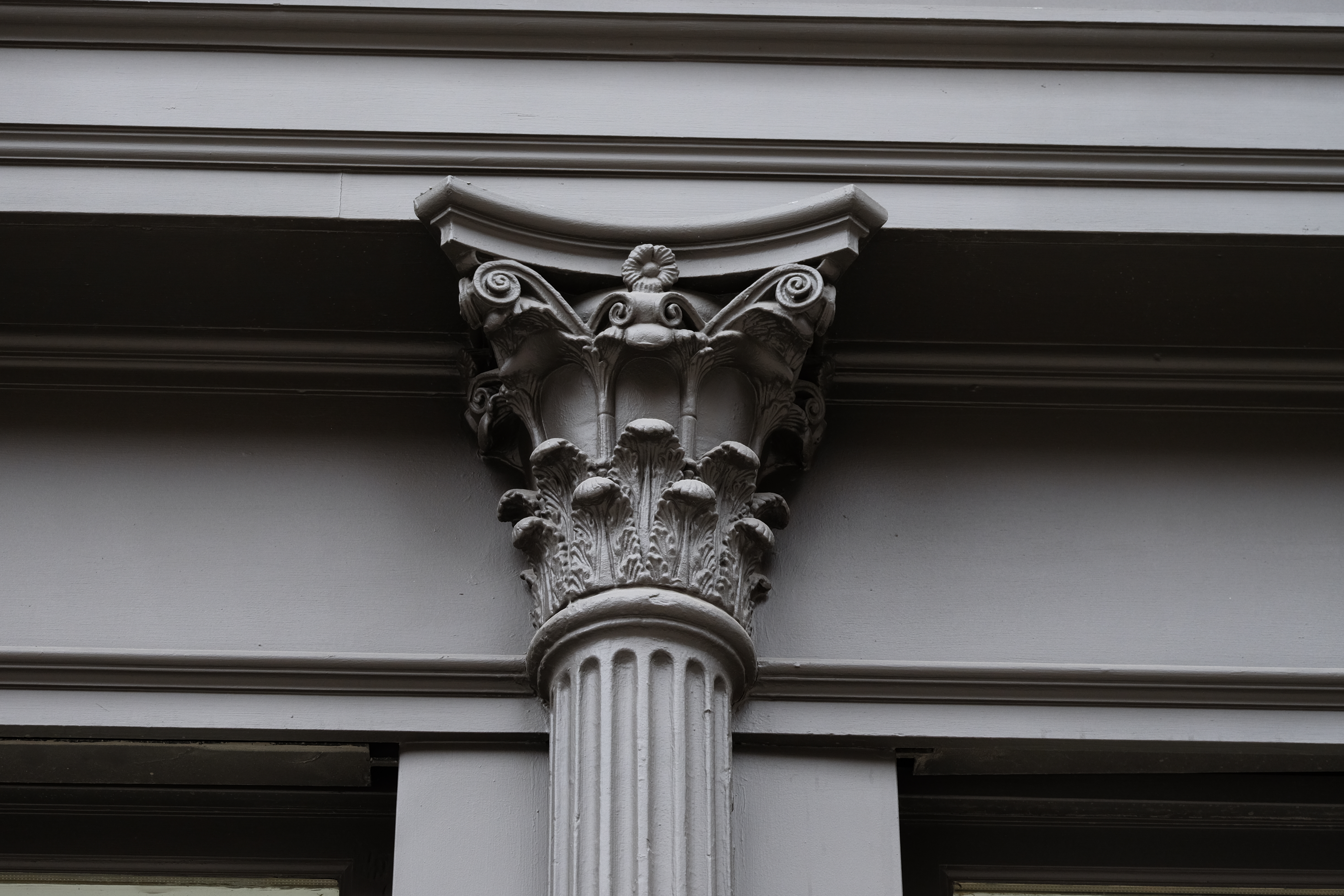
Capital detail at the ground floor

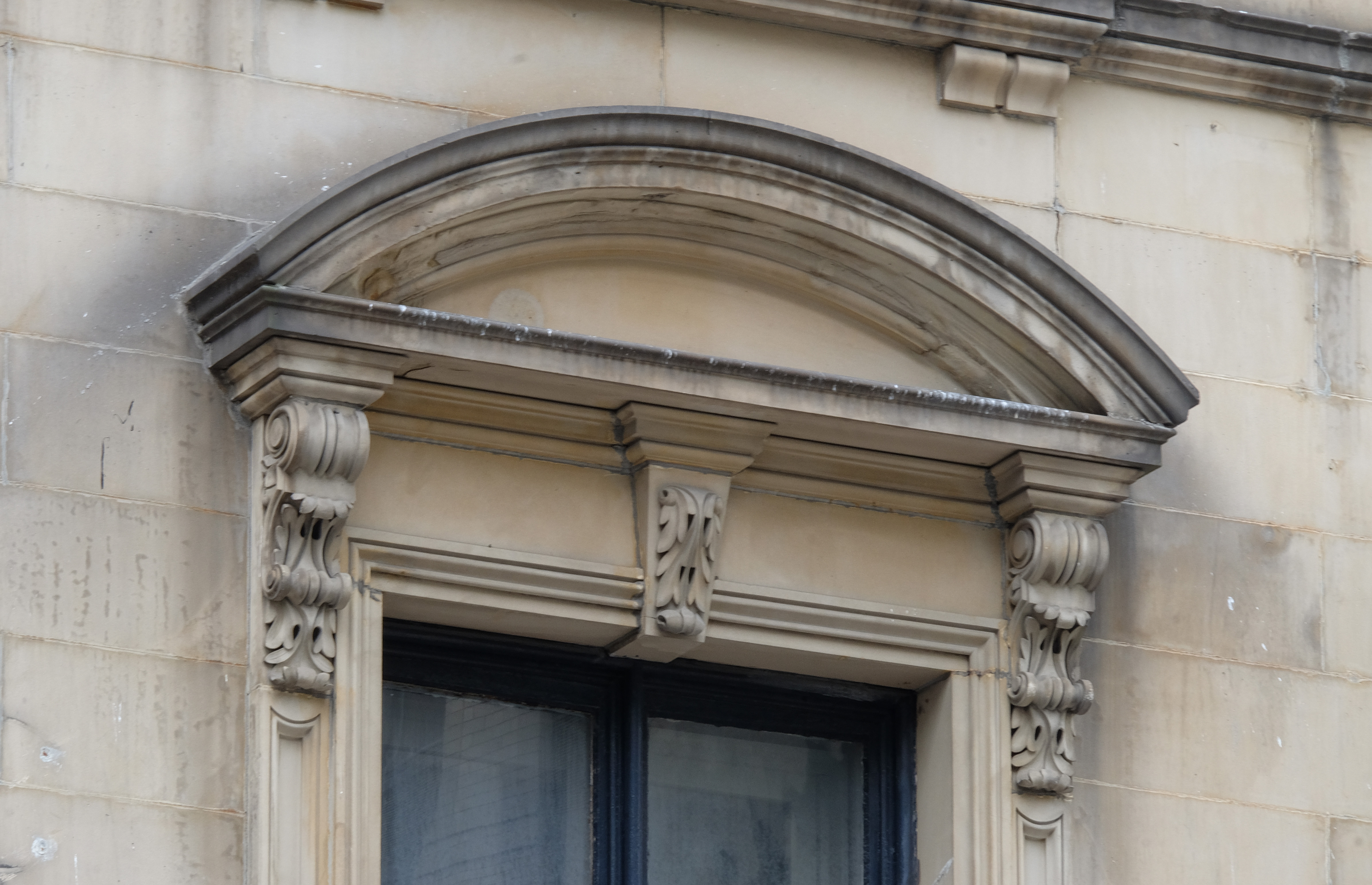
Rounded pediment detail

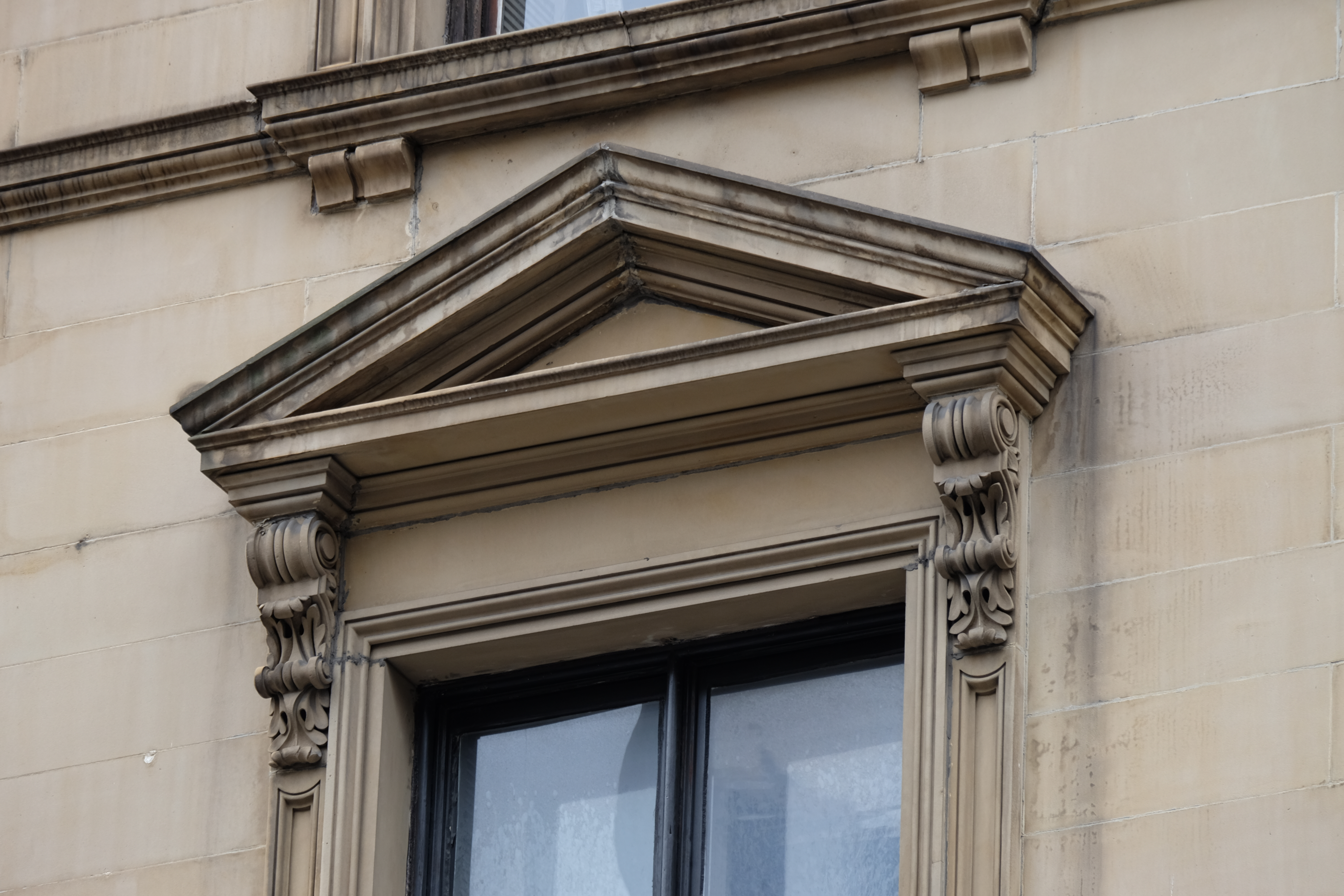
Triangular pediment detail

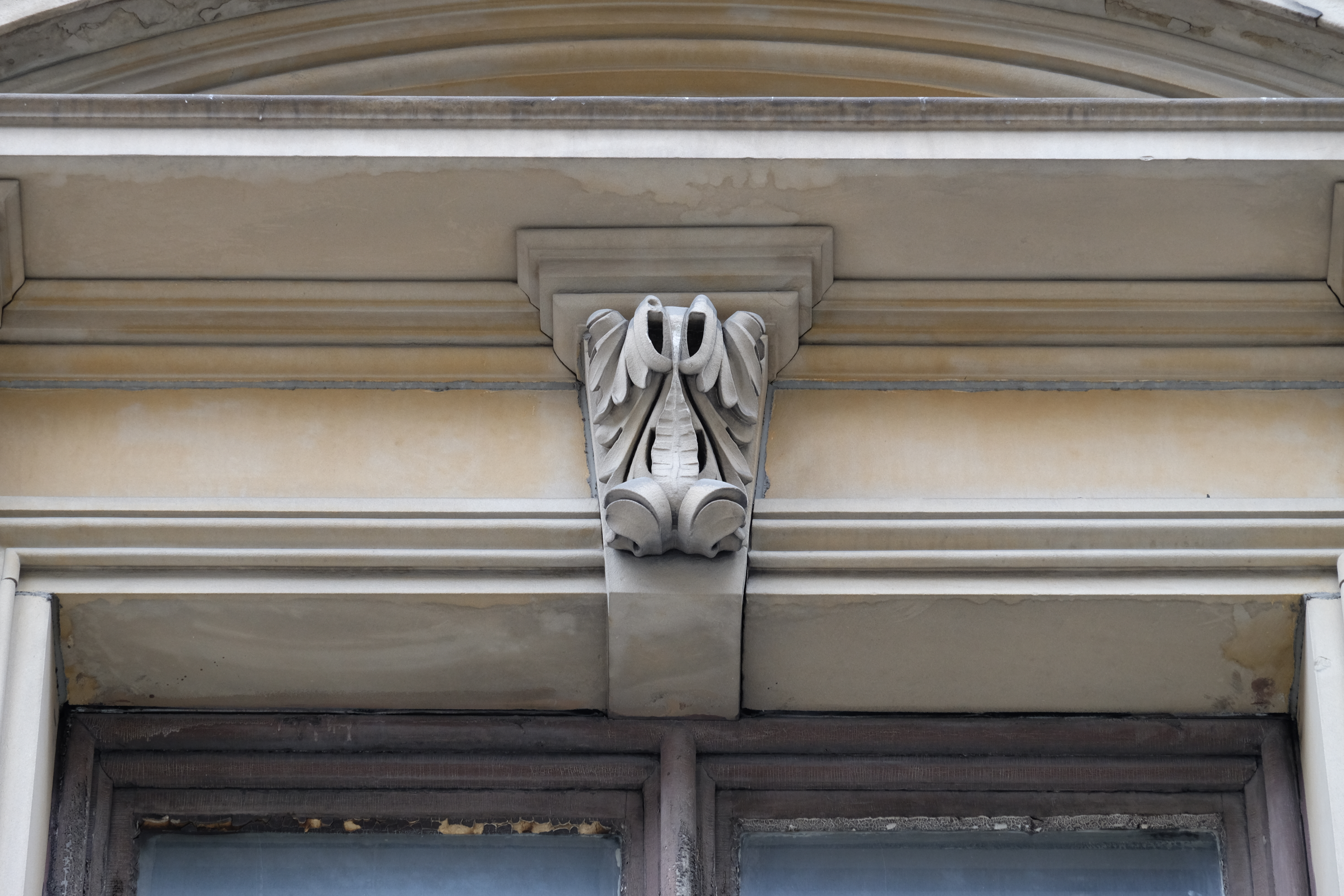
Center corbel detail above one of the windows

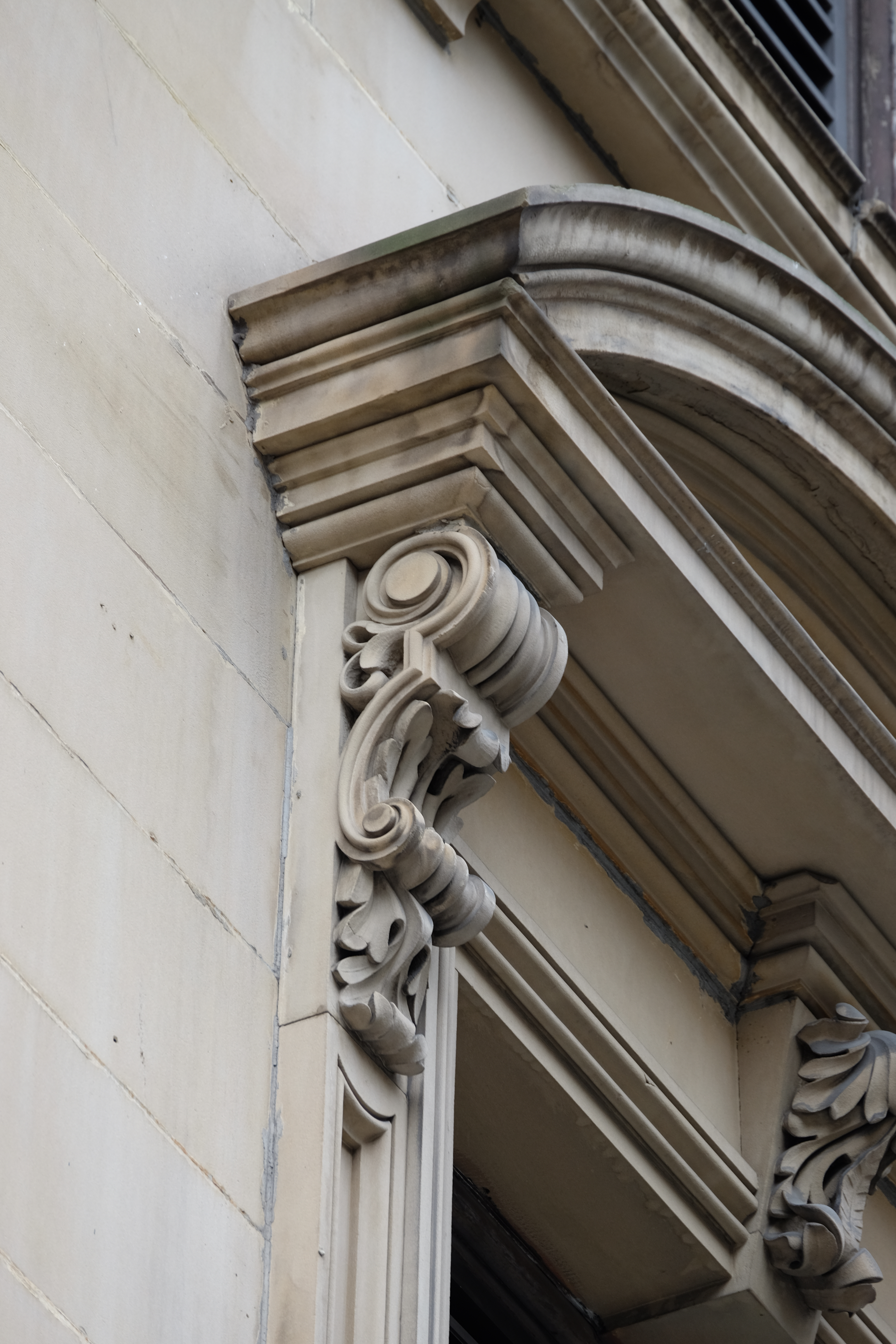
Corbel detail from the side of one of the windows

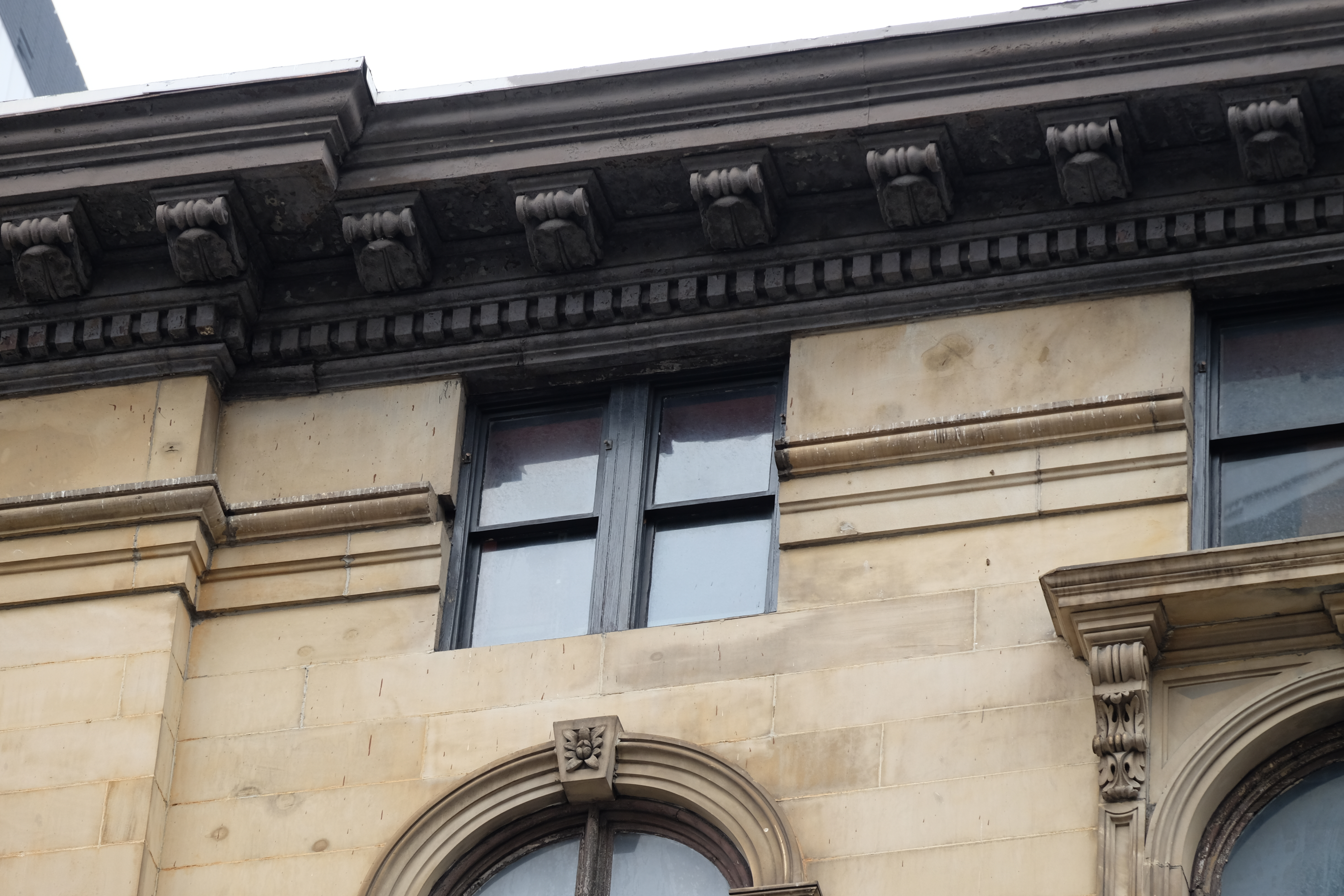
View of one of the sixth floor windows

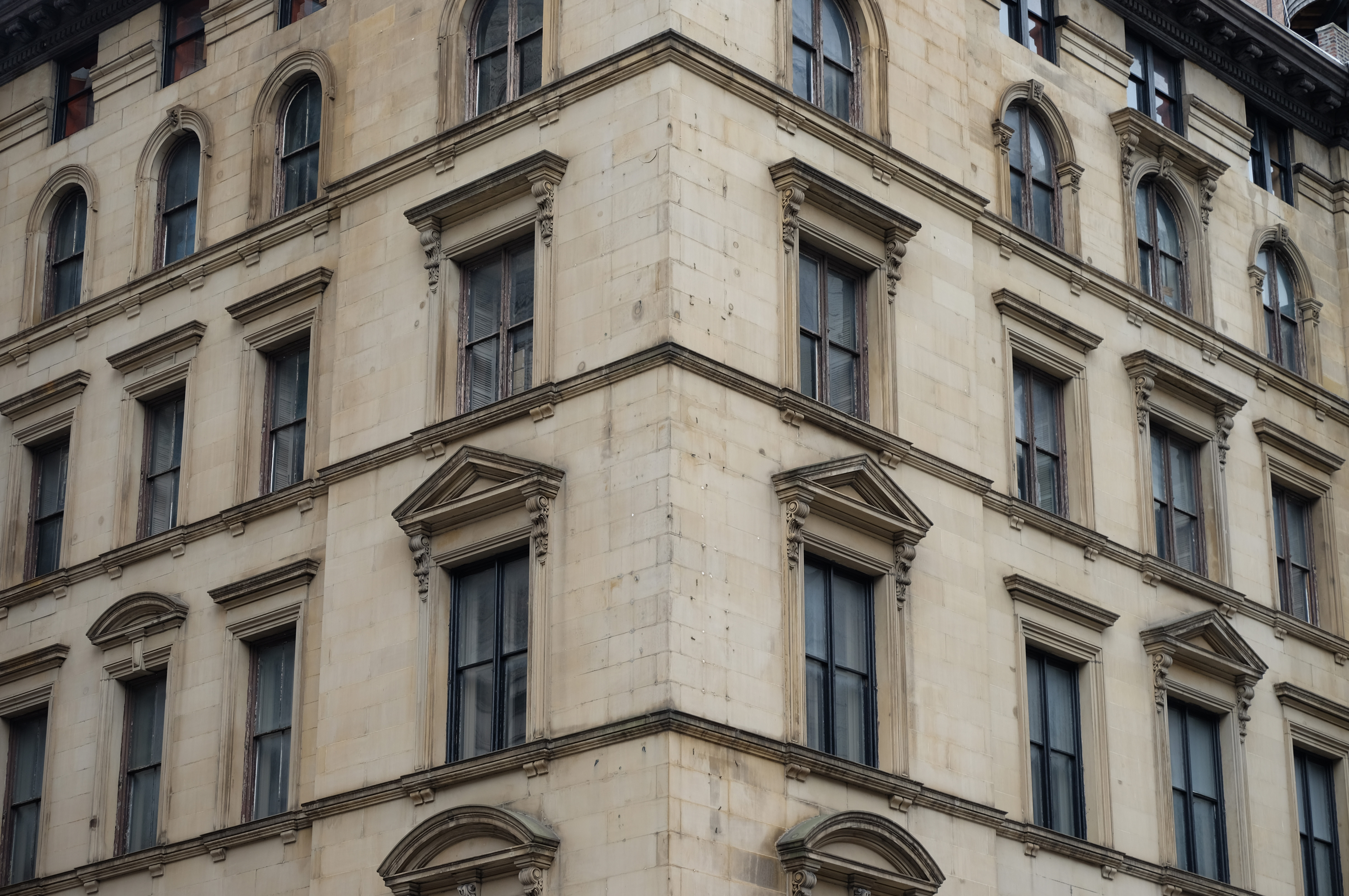
View of the northwest corner
