= Downtown Spruce Pine Historic District =

Historic district in North Carolina, United States

- U.S. National Register of Historic Places
- U.S. Historic district
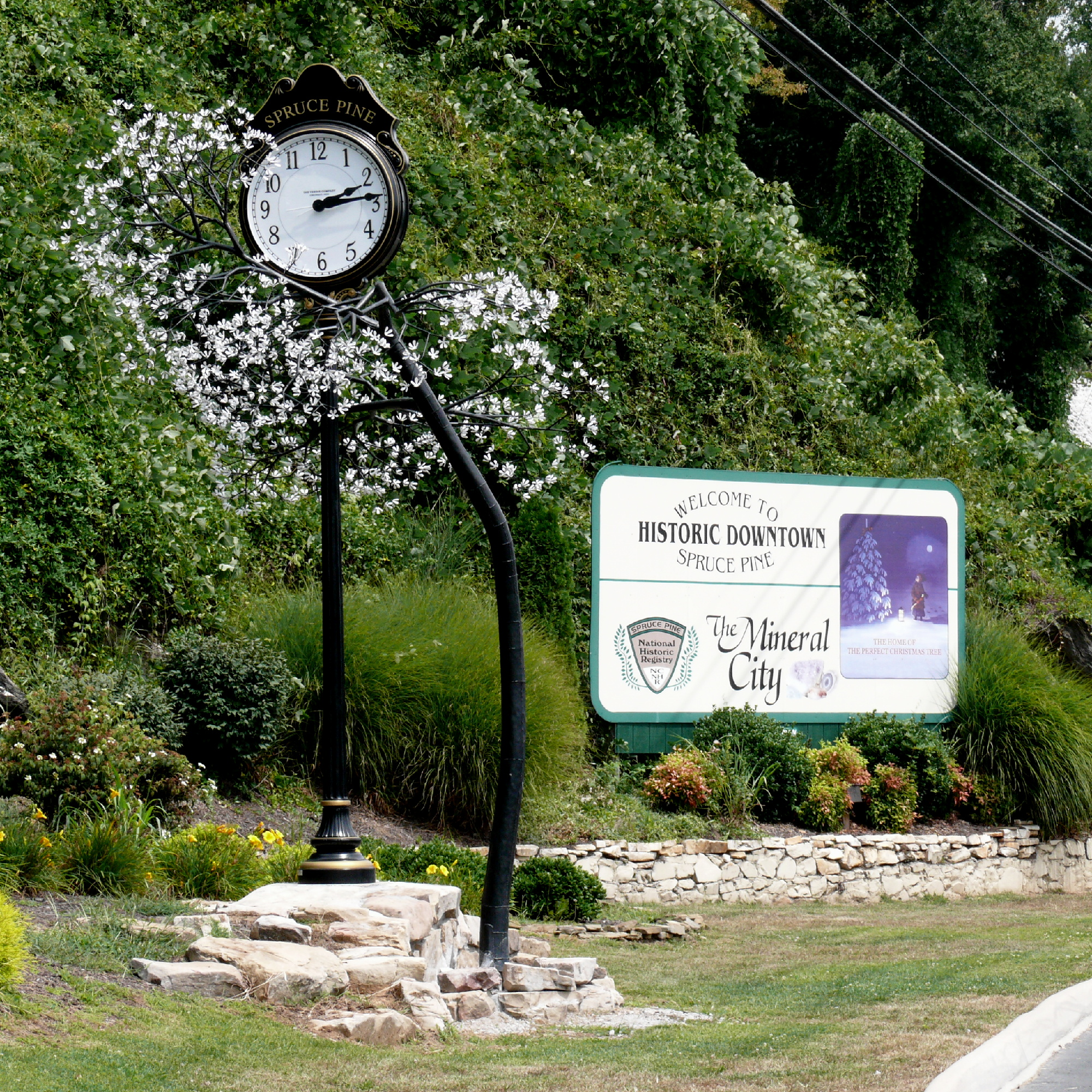
- Spruce Pine Clock and Welcome Sign, August 2008

- Location within North Carolina Location within the United States
- Location: Roughly bounded by Oak Ave., Locust St., Topaz St., and NC 226, Spruce Pine, North Carolina
- Coordinates: 35°54′58″N 82°4′12″W
- Area: 9.5 acres (3.8 ha)
- Built: c. 1909-1953
- Architectural style: Early Commercial, Tudor Revival, et al
- NRHP reference No.: 03000855
- Added to NRHP: August 28, 2003

Downtown Spruce Pine Historic District is a national historic district located at Spruce Pine, Mitchell County, North Carolina. The district encompasses 33 contributing buildings in the central business district of Spruce Pine. It was developed between 1909 and 1953, and includes notable examples of Early Commercial and Tudor Revival style architecture. Located in the district is the separately listed Gunter Building. Other notable buildings include the Spruce Pine Depot (1909), Crystal Place (1937), (former) Town Hall (1940), and Day's Drug Store (1950).

It was added to the National Register of Historic Places in 2003.

== Gallery ==
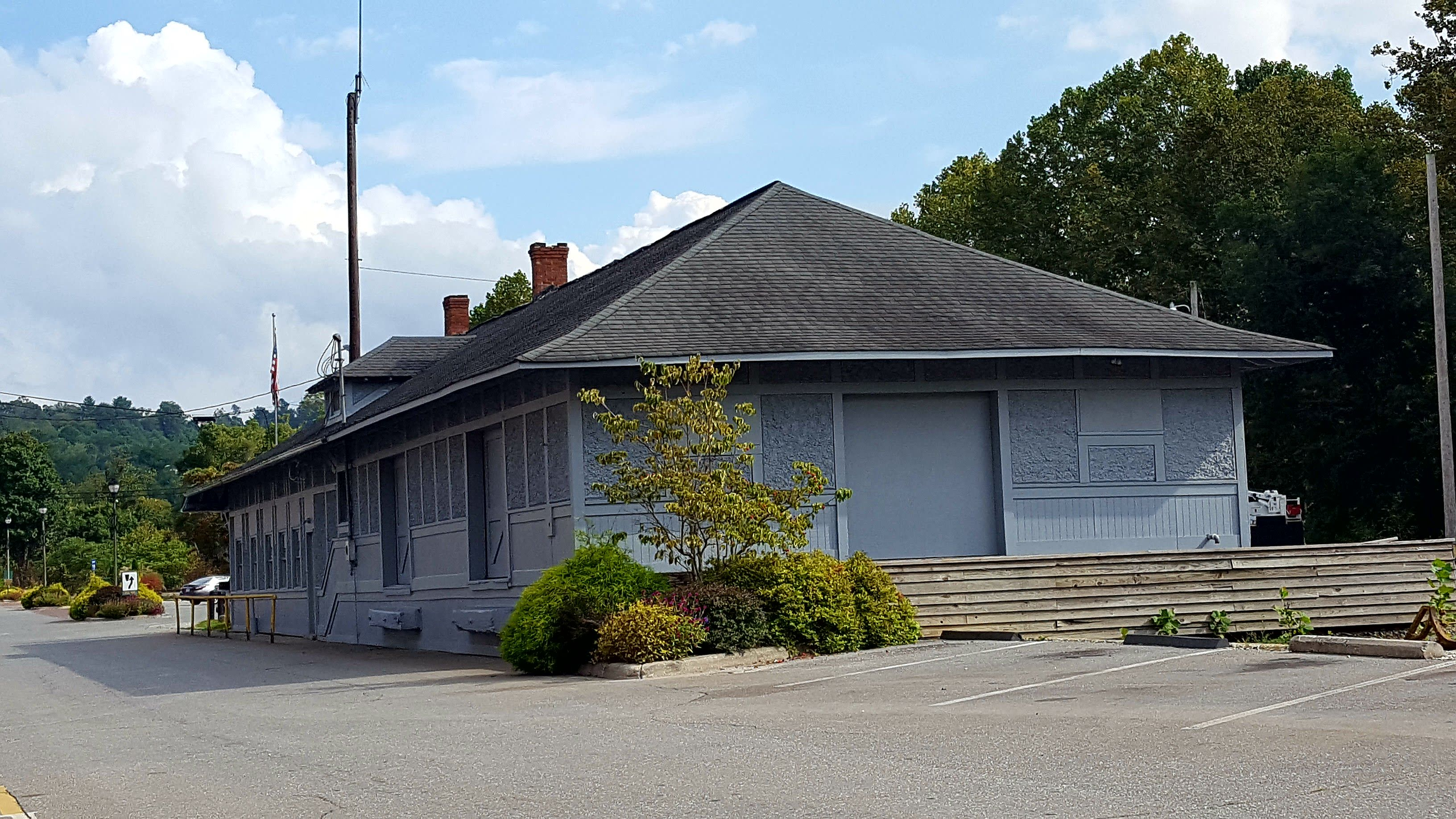
Spruce Pine Depot

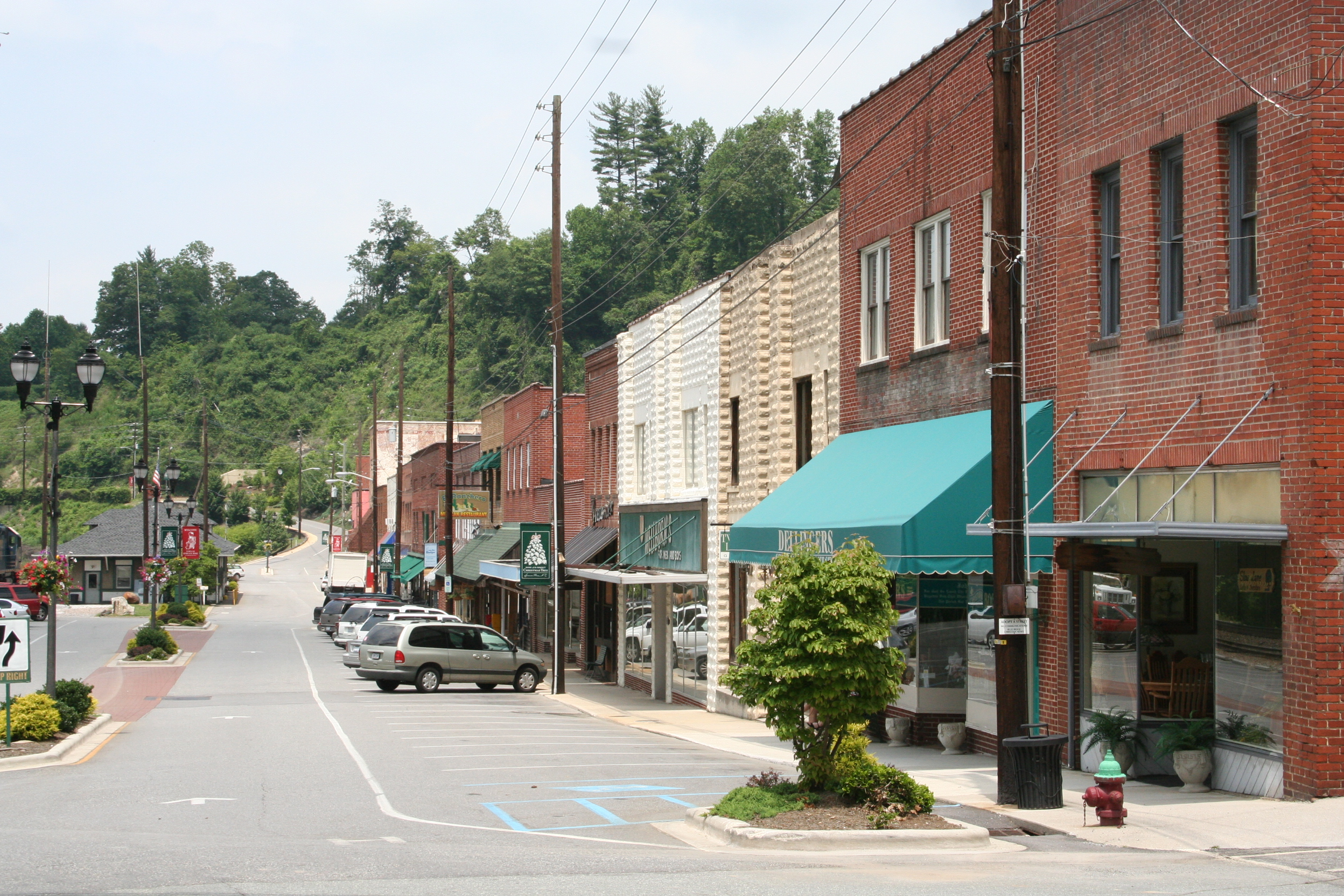
Downtown Spruce Pine NC, 2007
