= Gunther Building (Broome Street) =

Historic commercial building in Manhattan, New York

- U.S. Historic district – Contributing property
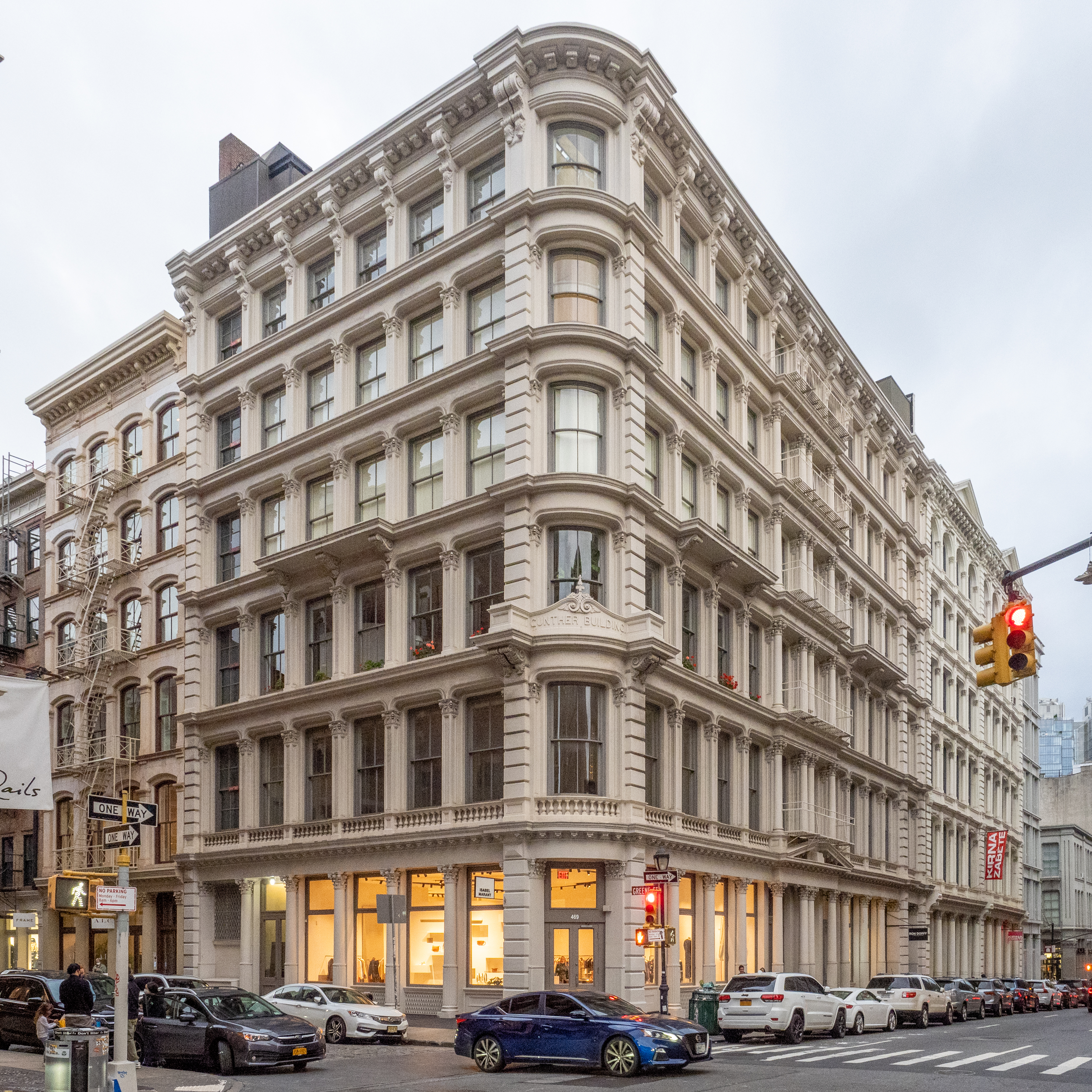
- The Gunther Building's distinctive curved corner
- Coordinates: 40°43′21″N 74°00′06″W
- Part of: SoHo-Cast Iron Historic District (ID78001883)
- Added to NRHP: June 29, 1978

The Gunther Building is an historic building at 469 Broome Street on the corner of Greene Street in the SoHo neighborhood of Manhattan, New York City.

== Description and history ==
The building was designed by Griffith Thomas in 1871 and was completed in 1871 or 1872. It is styled in the cast-iron architecture of its day, which is common in the area, but is distinguished from its neighbors by its bright white facade, its richly decorated Corinthian columns, and its curved glass corner. Built for William Gunther, a prominent 19th century furrier, the building was originally used as a warehouse for textiles and furs. Today it is used as a co-op primarily by artists and architects. Lenny Kravitz was once a resident.

The building is listed as contributing to the SoHo-Cast Iron Historic District and was added to the National Register of Historic Places in 1978.

In 2001 Beyhan Karahan and Associates completed a five-year project to restore the building's facade. The firm also restored the bullet glass sidewalk and steps. The following year the firm's restoration received the Excellence in Historic Preservation Award from the Preservation League of New York.
