= Gunter Building =

- U.S. National Register of Historic Places
- U.S. Historic district – Contributing property
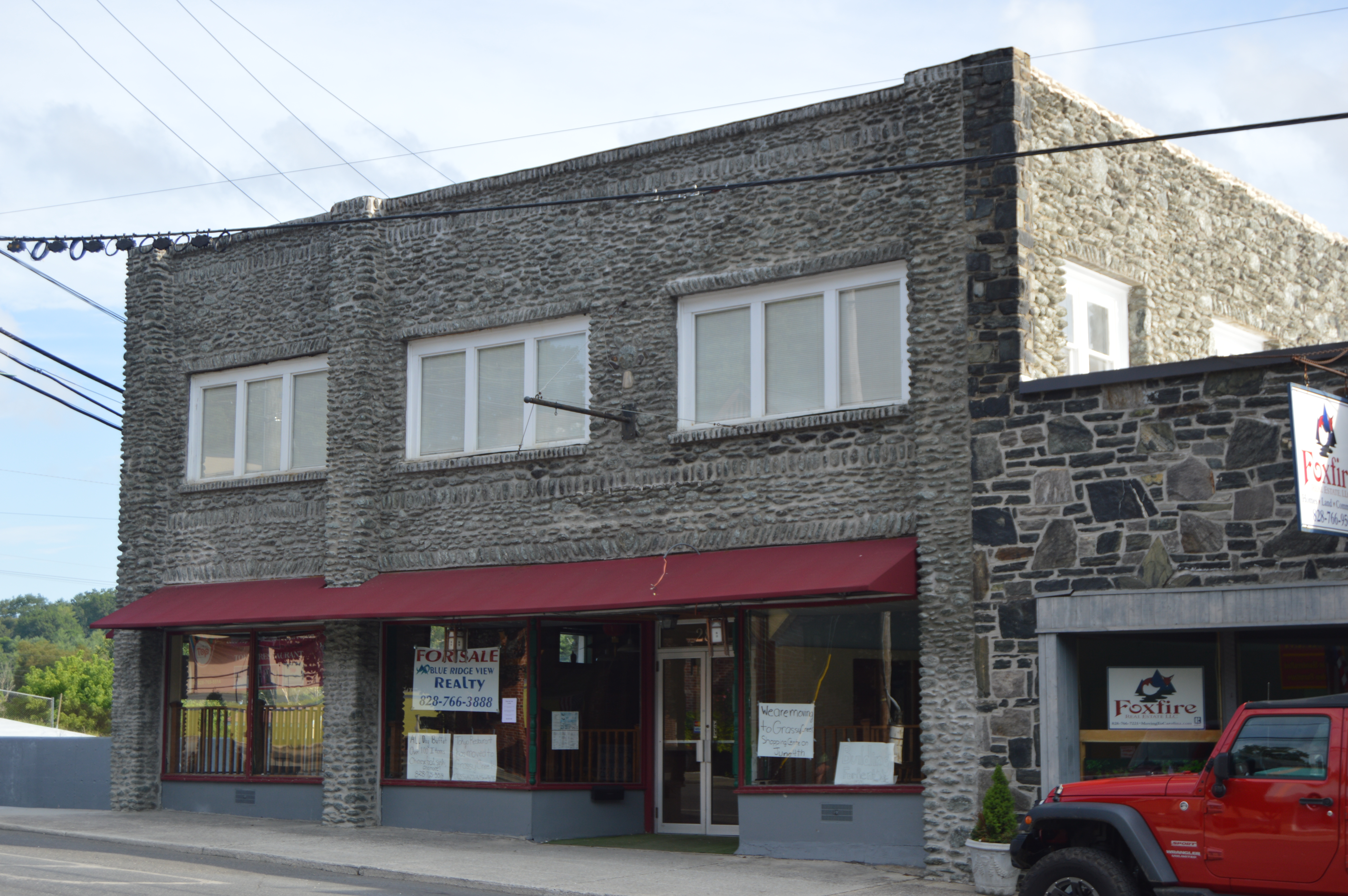
- Front and western side

- Location within North Carolina Location within the United States
- Location: 288 Oak Ave., Spruce Pine, North Carolina
- Coordinates: 35°54′56″N 82°4′6″W
- Area: 0.1 acres (0.040 ha)
- Built: 1941; 85 years ago
- Built by: Dave Greene, Charlie Mitchell
- Architectural style: Stone commercial
- NRHP reference No.: 02000112
- Added to NRHP: March 1, 2002; 24 years ago

Gunter Building is a historic commercial building located at Spruce Pine in Mitchell County, North Carolina, United States. It was built about 1941, and is a two-story, three bay by four bay, building constructed of river-tumbled micaceous biotite. It was built by local stonemasons Charlie Mitchell and Dave Greene for the Belk-Broome Company.

It was added to the National Register of Historic Places in 2002. It is located in the Downtown Spruce Pine Historic District.
