= Griffith Thomas =

American architect

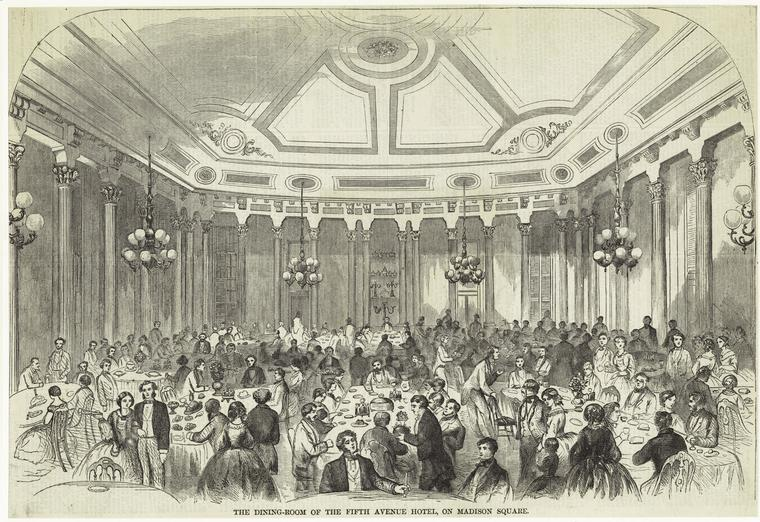
Dining room of the Fifth Avenue Hotel, 1859

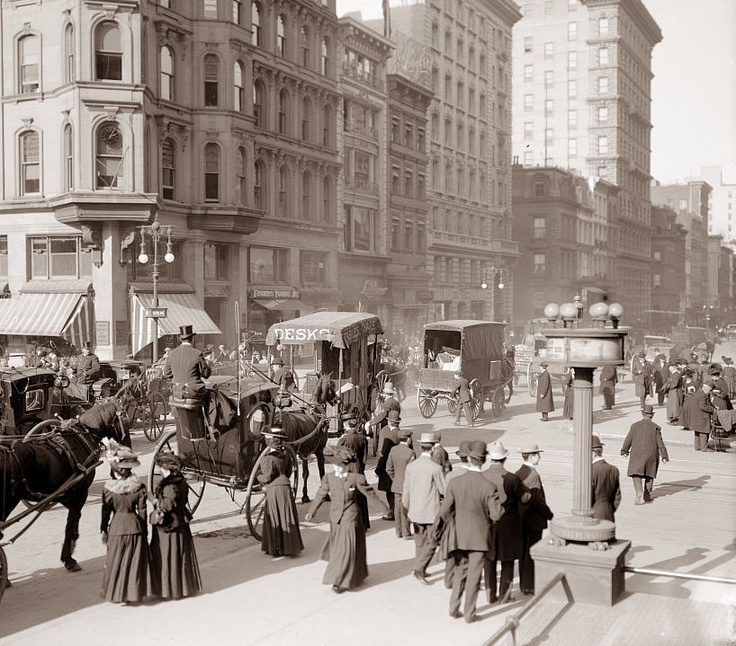
Hotel Bristol at left, circa 1900

Griffith Thomas (1820–1879) was an American architect. He partnered with his father, Thomas Thomas, at the architecture firm of T. Thomas and Son.

Architecture writer Christopher Gray called him "one of the most prolific architects of the period", referring to the mid-19th century. The American Institute of Architects in 1908 called him "the most fashionable architect of his generation." Many of his notable buildings are found in New York City.

Griffith Thomas was interred at Green-Wood Cemetery, in Brooklyn, New York in 1879. His own marble monument is simple in comparison to the ornate structures he built during his lifetime.

== Selected works ==
- St. Nicholas Hotel (1853), 507-27 Broadway, demolished. 1,000 guest rooms.
- Fifth Avenue Hotel (1859), 200 Fifth Avenue (23rd to 24th Streets), demolished. Replaced by Robert Maynicke's Toy Center Building, 1909.
- Astor Library Building (1859 expansion), 444 Lafayette Street. Now the center section of The Public Theater.
- Madison Avenue Baptist Church (1859). Demolished.
- Mortimer Building (1862), 935-939 Broadway (159 Fifth Avenue) Flatiron House. Now Restoration Hardware Building .
- National Park Bank Building (1868, altered 1905), 214-18 Broadway, demolished 1961
- Pike's Opera House (1868), 8th Avenue & 23rd Street, later renamed the Grand Opera House, demolished 1960.
- Arnold Constable Building (1869), Broadway & West 19th Street
- New York Life Insurance Building (1870), 346 Broadway. Altered and expanded by McKim, Mead & White, 1904.
- 12 East 53rd Street (1872). Altered by Raleigh C. Gildersleeve, 1906.
- Gunther Building (1872), 469-75 Broome Street, cast-iron facade.
- Hotel Bristol (1875), 42nd Street and Fifth Avenue, New York City, for the former shipbuilder and financier William H. Webb, demolished.
- Kimball House Hotel (1870) Entire city block between Whitehall (now Peachtree) Street, Decatur Street, Pryor Street, and Wall Street, Atlanta, [8] with William Parkins, burned 1883. 500 rooms, early use of elevators and central heating, 4-story lobby, 16 shops.
