= Sophia Louise Little =

American poet and abolitionist (1799–1893)

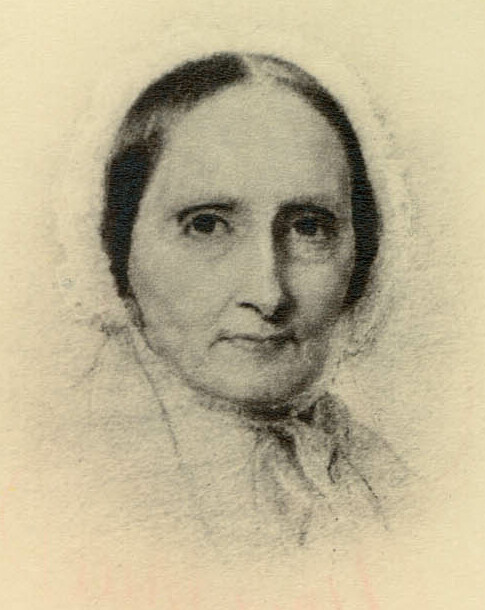

Sophia Louise (Note: The middle name is sometimes given as "Louisa", and frequently abbreviated to the initial "L.") Little (née Robbins; 1799–1893) was an American poet and abolitionist.

== Life ==
Sophia Louise Robbins was born in Newport, Rhode Island, on August 22, 1799. She was the second daughter of Asher Robbins, a United States Senator from Rhode Island. She was educated in her native town, and in 1834 married William Little, Jr., of Boston, who assisted her by his criticism in the development of her poetic talent. Her first poem of any length, a description of a New England Thanksgiving, was printed in 1828 in The Token.

Sophia Little took an active interest in the anti-slavery movement, and was a life-long friend of William Lloyd Garrison, being present at the Boston meeting, at which he was mobbed. She was also president of the Prisoner's Aid Association of Rhode Island from its formation. With the aid of friends, she opened a free reading room for working people in Newport, which proved to be the germ of a free public library. She also established a Holly-tree coffee-house, and was still active in many charitable enterprises in 1887.

Little died in 1893. Her son, Robbins Little, became a lawyer and librarian.

== Works ==
Little, besides contributing frequently to various periodicals, published the following poems:

- "The Last Days of Jesus " (Boston, 1839);
- "The Annunciation and Birth of Jesus, and the Resurrection" (1843);
- "Pentecost" (1873).

In 1877 a complete edition of her religious poems was published at Newport, bearing the title, Last Days of Jesus, and Other Poems.

== Sources ==
- Ockerbloom, John Mark, ed. "Little, Sophia L. (Sophia Louisa), 1799-". The Online Books Page. Retrieved September 7, 2022.
- Van Broekhoven, Deborah Bingham (2000). "Little, Sophia Louisa Robbins (1799-1893), writer and reformer". American National Biography. Oxford University Press. Retrieved August 20, 2022.

Attribution:
