= Asher Robbins =

American lawyer

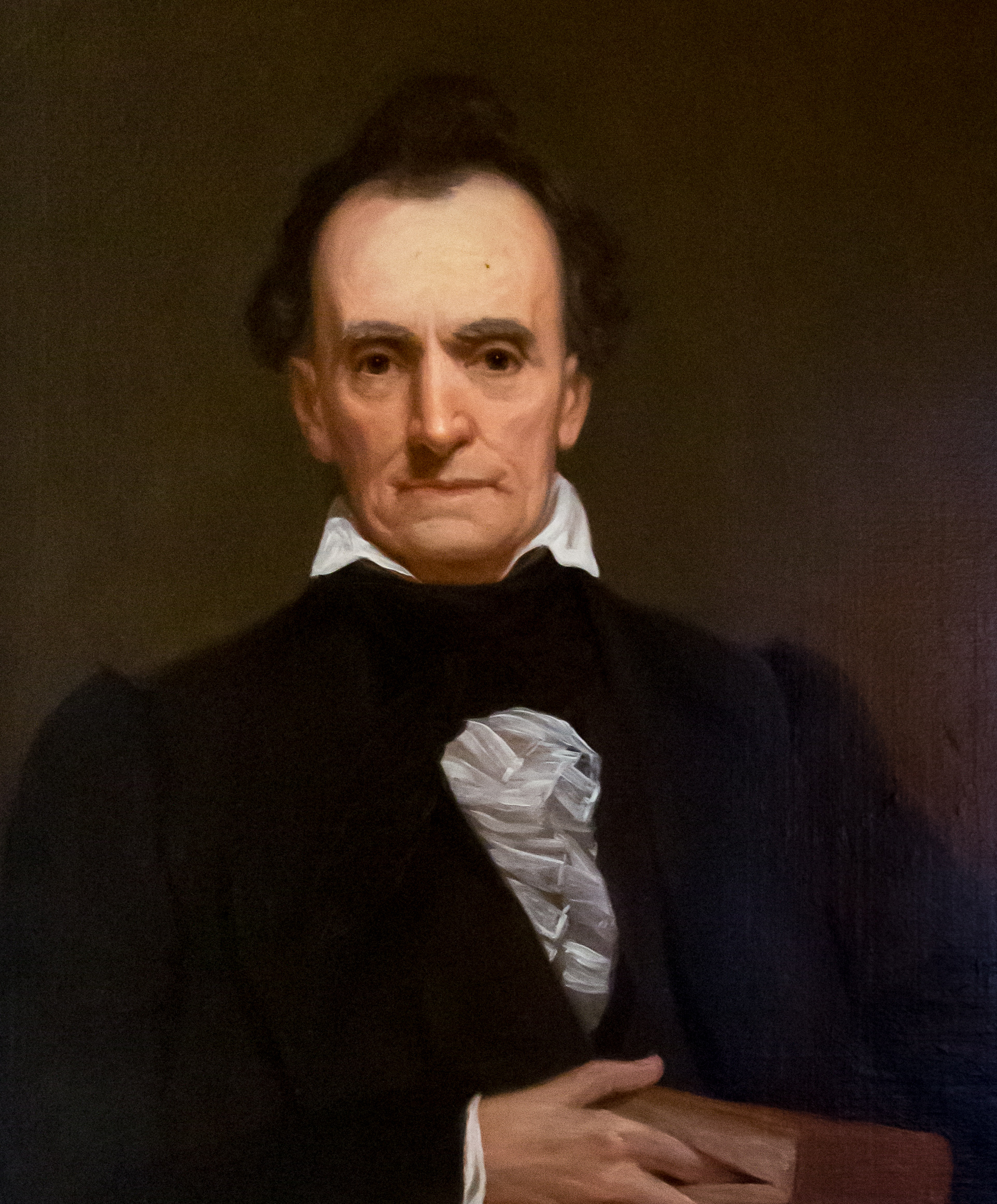
- Official portrait in the RI State House

United States Senator from Rhode Island
- In office October 31, 1825 – March 3, 1839
- Preceded by: James De Wolf
- Succeeded by: Nathan F. Dixon

Member of the Rhode Island General Assembly
- In office 1840–1841
- In office 1818–1825

Personal details
- Born: October 26, 1761 Wethersfield, Connecticut
- Died: February 25, 1845 (aged 83) Newport, Rhode Island, U.S.
- Resting place: Common Burial Ground
- Party: Federalist; National Republican; Whig
- Education: Yale College
- Profession: Politician, lawyer

Asher Robbins (also known as Ashur Robbins; October 26, 1761 – February 25, 1845) was a United States senator from Rhode Island.

== Early life ==
Born in Wethersfield, Connecticut on October 26, 1761, he graduated from Yale College in 1782, was a tutor at Rhode Island College (now Brown University) from 1782 to 1790, studied law, was admitted to the bar in 1792 and began practice in Providence, Rhode Island.

== Politics ==
He moved to Newport in 1795, was a Federalist candidate for Rhode Island's at-large congressional district in 1800, was appointed United States district attorney in 1812, and was a member of the Rhode Island Assembly from 1818 to 1825.

Robbins was elected as Adams (later Anti-Jacksonian and then Whig) to the U.S. Senate in 1825 to fill the vacancy caused by the resignation of James De Wolf; he was reelected in 1827 and 1833 and served from October 31, 1825, to March 3, 1839. While in the Senate, he was chairman of the Committee on Engrossed Bills (Twenty-second Congress).

== Later life ==
After his time in the Senate, Robbins was again a member of the State assembly (1840–1841) and was postmaster of Newport from 1841 until his death in that city in 1845; interment was in the Common Burial Ground. His daughter was the poet Sophia Louise Little.

U.S. Senate
| Preceded by James De Wolf | U.S. senator (Class 1) from Rhode Island; October 31, 1825 – March 3, 1839; Served alongside: Nehemiah R. Knight | Succeeded by Nathan F. Dixon |
Honorary titles
| Preceded by Nathaniel Chipman | Oldest living U.S. senator February 13, 1843 – February 25, 1845 | Succeeded by William Plumer |
