= Charles Alexander Nelson =

American librarian (1839–1933)

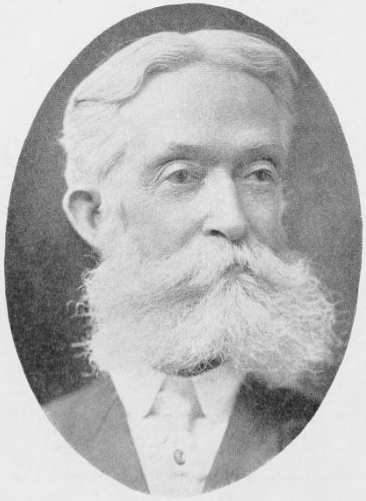
- Born: April 14, 1839; Calais
- Died: January 13, 1933 (aged 93)
- Alma mater: Harvard University
- Occupation: Librarian
- Awards: American Library Association Honorary Membership (1927)

Charles Alexander Nelson (April 14, 1839 - January 13, 1933) was an American librarian and bibliographer.

Nelson worked as a civil engineer and businessman before he became interested in library science. From 1881 to1888, he worked on the publication of the catalog of the Astor Library in four volumes. He then became the first librarian of the Howard Memorial Library of New Orleans. From 1891 to 1893, he worked on a catalog for the Newberry Library in Chicago, and until 1909 he was deputy librarian of Columbia University. From 1913 to 1926, he was on the staff of the Merchants' Association of New York, where he worked on an index-digest of its activities. Nelson was one of the founders of the New York Library Club and was several times elected to civil offices.

== Early life ==
His parents were Israel Potter and Jane (Capen) Nelson. He attended private schools for his early education, and entered the college class of Cambridge High School when his parents moved to Cambridge, Massachusetts, in December 1855. He matriculated at Harvard in 1857, graduating in 1860.

He spent a year as a Latin and Greek tutor at an academy, and studied civil engineering for a year at Lawrence Scientific School. He studied library science at the College Library in Boston, then engaged in teaching.

== Career ==
In 1864/5 he was a civil engineer in government service at New Berne, North Carolina. He afterward engaged in business there, and was several times elected to civil offices.

From 1874 until 1881, he was connected with the book trade in Boston, and was employed in literary, library, and editorial work. For six years, he was the Boston correspondent of the American Bookseller, and in 1876 joined the editorial staff of Zion's Herald.

Nelson gave special study to library economics, and after 1881 had charge of a continuation catalog of the Astor Library. This work lasted until 1888, and the result was published in four volumes (1886-1888). On the completion of the catalog, he left the Astor Library and became the first librarian of the Howard Memorial Library of New Orleans. From 1891 to 1893 he worked on a catalog for the Newberry Library in Chicago, and until 1909 he was deputy librarian of Columbia University. From 1913 to 1926, he was on the staff of the Merchants' Association of New York, where he worked on an index-digest of its activities.

== Personal life ==
He was one of the founders, and in 1888 secretary, of the New York Library Club. He married Emma Norris, and they had two children.

In 1927 he was awarded American Library Association Honorary Membership.

== Works ==
- Waltham, Past and Present, and its Industries (1879)
- "Weston" in Samuel A. Drake, ed., History of Middlesex County, Massachusetts (1880)
- Catalogue of the Astor Library (Continuation), Vol. I.-IV. (1886-1888)
- Catalogue of the Avery Architectural Library (1895)
- Catalogue raisonné, works on bookbinding from the Samuel Putnam Avery collection (1903)
- Analytical Index to Volumes 1-25 of the Educational Review (1903)
- Minutes of the Common Council of the City of New York, 1675-1776, index (8 vols., 1905-1906)
