= Edward R. Straznicky =

United States librarian

Edward R. Straznicky (c. 1820 – 9 February 1876) was superintendent of the Astor Library 1872-1876. He created the first catalogue of the library which was published in 1857.

== Biography ==
He was born in Tišnov, Moravia, educated at the University of Vienna, taking degrees in the departments of medicine and philosophy, and acquired by travel a familiar knowledge of modern languages. He served as an assistant professor at the Higher Educational Private Institution of Agriculture in Magyaróvár (now Faculty of Agricultural and Food Sciences, Széchenyi István University, Hungary) from 1846 to 1848. During the Hungarian Revolution of 1848 he served as an officer in the Hungarian Revolutionary Army. After the defeat of the nationalists he was exiled, and his property was confiscated.

After a brief residence in England, Straznicky went to the United States, and found employment as a merchant in Philadelphia. In 1859 he became an assistant librarian in the Astor Library in New York City, and in 1872 he was elected superintendent, an office he held until he died.

Straznicky was also the librarian (1857-1859) and recording secretary of the American Geographical Society, a position he held until 1872.
