= Joseph Cogswell =

American librarian (1786–1871)

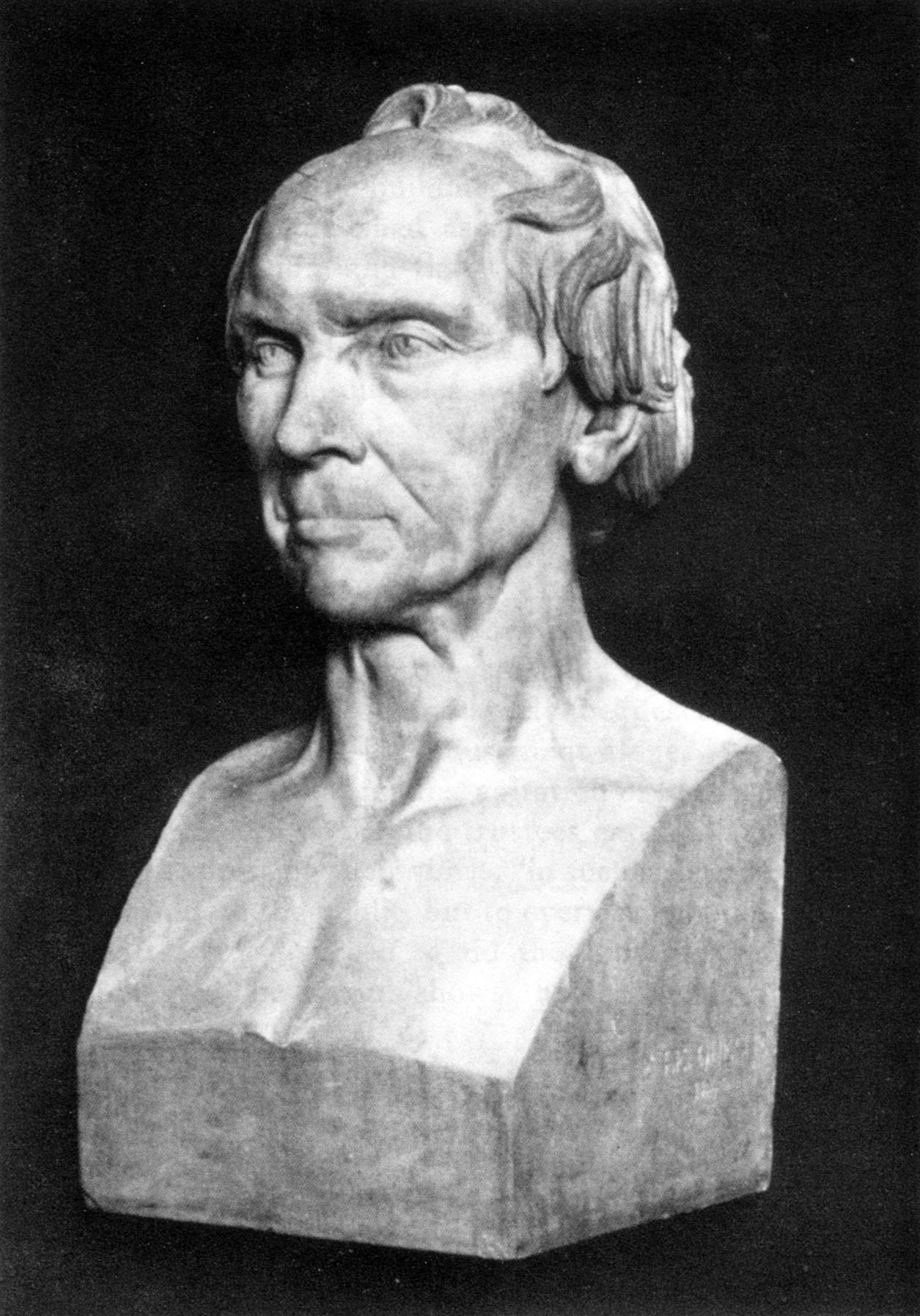
- 1853 bust by Eugène Lequesne

Joseph Green Cogswell (September 27, 1786 – November 26, 1871) was an American librarian, bibliographer and educator.

== Education ==
Born in Ipswich, Massachusetts, Cogswell received a grammar school education in Ipswich, and attended Phillips Exeter Academy. He graduated from Harvard in 1806, and studied law from 1807 to 1809. After making a voyage to India as supercargo of the vessel in which he sailed, Cogswell studied law with Fisher Ames in Dedham, and practised for a few years in Belfast, Maine. In 1812 he married Mary, the daughter of Gov. John Taylor Gilman. She died in 1813. Her death, and a distaste for the profession, led him to abandon the practice of law.

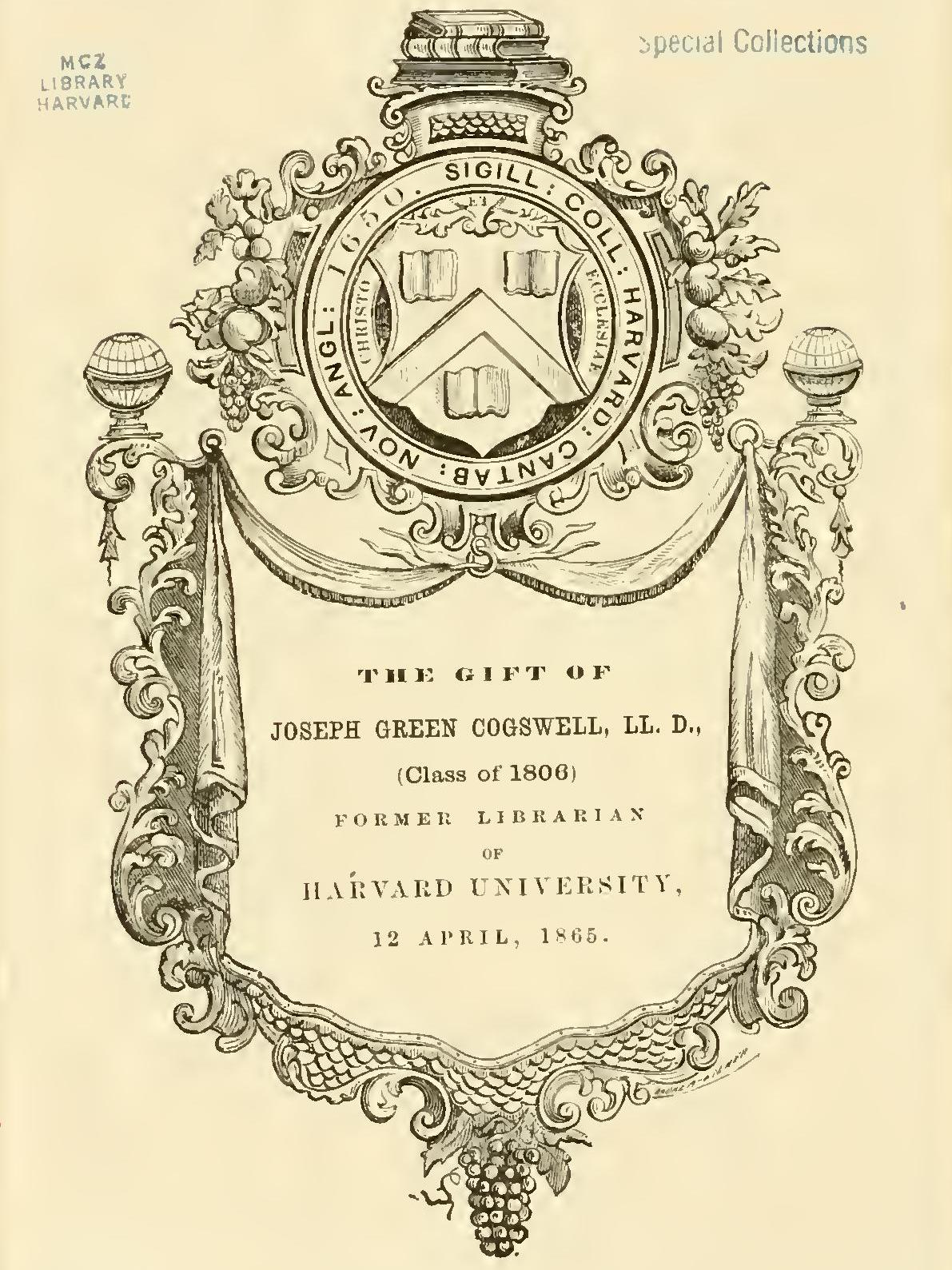
Bookplate from a book formerly owned by Joseph Green Cogswell

From 1813 till 1815 he was a tutor at Harvard. He was elected an Associate Fellow of the American Academy of Arts and Sciences in 1816. That year Cogswell went to Europe, and, in company with George Ticknor, spent two years at the University of Göttingen, where he paid special attention to the methods and principles of instruction. Two more years were passed in Europe, chiefly on the continent, in the principal capitals, and in the study of educational problems and bibliography. During part of this time, Edward Everett was his companion. He was, with his friend Ticknor, the guest of Sir Walter Scott, at Abbotsford. He also contributed to Blackwood's Magazine (February, March 1819) two anonymous essays critically examining education in the United States.

== Educator ==
Returning to the United States in 1820, he was appointed professor of geology and mineralogy, and college librarian at Harvard. In 1823, having resigned his chair in Harvard, he, in connection with George Bancroft, the historian, established Round Hill School at Northampton, Massachusetts. The plan of the institution was novel, and based on an examination of the best English and German systems of education. After Bancroft's departure from the school in 1830, Cogswell continued the work. It was too much for him alone, and he closed the doors of the school in 1834. He then assumed the charge of a similar institution in Raleigh, North Carolina. This was the Episcopal Boys School, founded in 1833 by Bishop Levi Silliman Ives on the model of the Church Institute at Flushing, New York, a most successful school founded by William Augustus Muhlenberg (1796-1877) in 1828. Hence Ives and Cogswell intended to apply what had been learned about superlative instruction at both Flushing and Round Hill. Ill health and incompatibility with Southern culture led to Cogswell's resignation after only two years at Raleigh. The Boys School closed in 1838 but with the support of Duncan Cameron was reestablished in 1842 as a girls' school. The Reverend Aldert Smedes was appointed Rector of the newly christened "St. Mary's College," a girls' school still thriving. (Smedes's four sons went to Saint James School in Maryland.)

== Editor and librarian ==
In 1836, he entered the family of banker Samuel Ward (father of Julia Ward Howe and Samuel Cutler Ward) in New York City. Three of Ward's sons had been students at Round Hill School. Cogswell also became editor of the New York Review, one of the leading American critical journals of the time. He remained as editor until its suspension in 1842. Through Ward, he became the friend and companion of John Jacob Astor, upon whom he urged the project of a library. Succeeding in this promotion, Cogswell, in conjunction with Astor, Washington Irving and Fitz-Greene Halleck, arranged the plan of the Astor Library. With Halleck, Irving, and others, Cogswell was appointed a trustee of the fund for its creation.

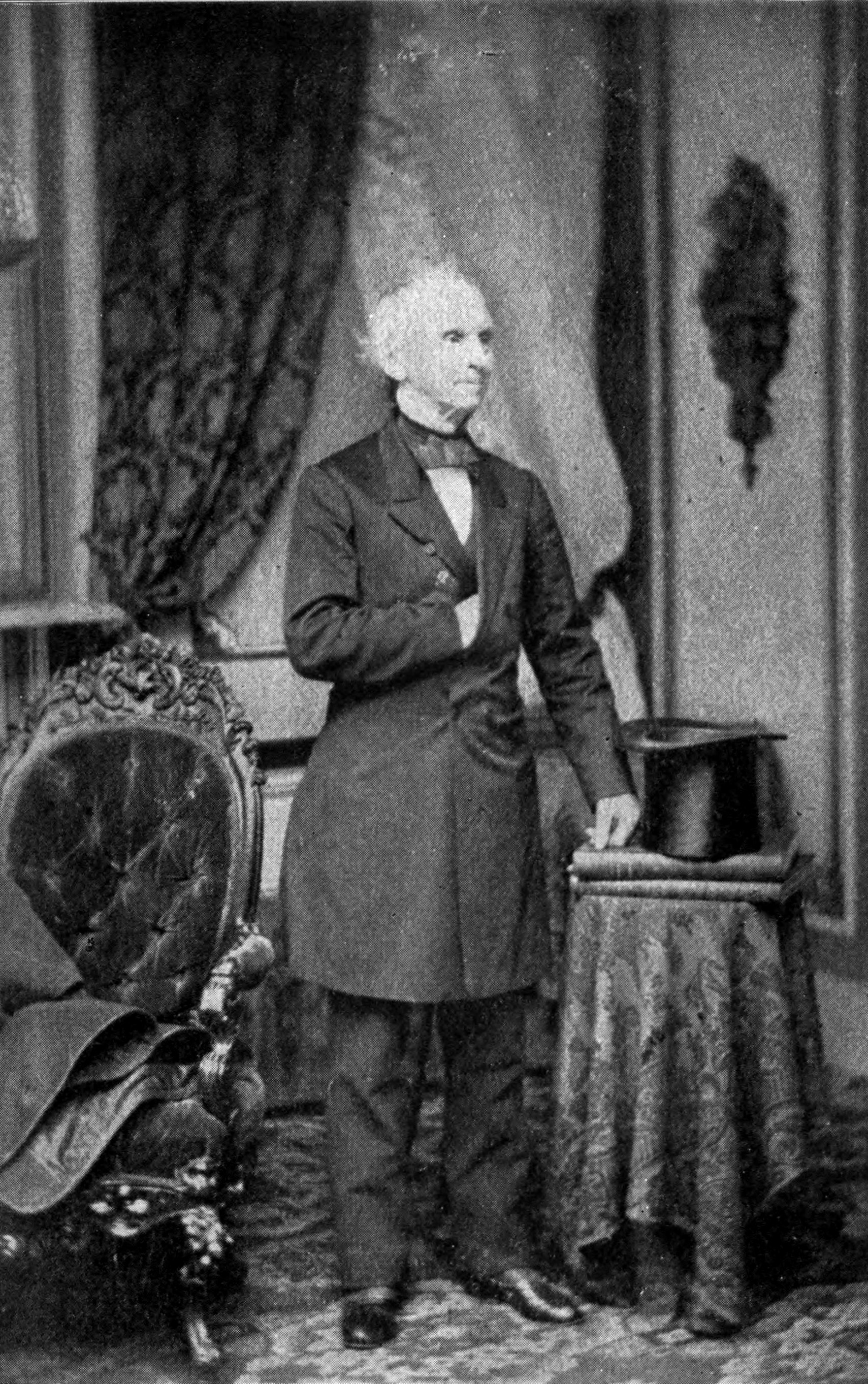
Joseph Cogswell c. 1870

When Washington Irving was appointed minister to Spain, he was anxious that his friend Cogswell should accompany him as secretary of legation, and accordingly wrote to Washington, requesting his appointment. “He is,” said Irving, “a gentleman with whom I am on terms of confidential intimacy, and I know no one who, by his various acquirements, his prompt sagacity, his knowledge of the world, his habits of business, and his obliging disposition, is so calculated to give me that counsel, aid, and companionship, so important in Madrid, where a stranger is more isolated than in any other capital of Europe.”

Cogswell received the appointment, and would probably have accepted it, but, Astor finding that he was likely to lose his invaluable services, made him superintendent of the new library. After the rich merchant's death, in 1848, Cogswell traveled to Europe to purchase books. Cogswell made many acquaintances among European intellectual elites during his frequent visits to Europe, including Johann von Goethe, Alexander von Humboldt, Pierre-Jean de Béranger, Lord Byron, and Walter Scott. His general bibliographical knowledge was of great service to the Astor Library, one great work undertaken by him being the preparation of an analytical and alphabetical catalogue of the collection. He also gave the Astor Library his own valuable series of works relating to bibliography, as he had before united with a friend in presenting Harvard with a rare cabinet of minerals and numerous botanical specimens.

He continued the duties of superintendent until his retirement due to old age in 1861. Cogswell returned to Massachusetts—settling in Cambridge, Massachusetts. He resigned as a Trustee of the Astor Library in 1863. He died November 26, 1871, in Cambridge.
