= Robbins Little =

American lawyer

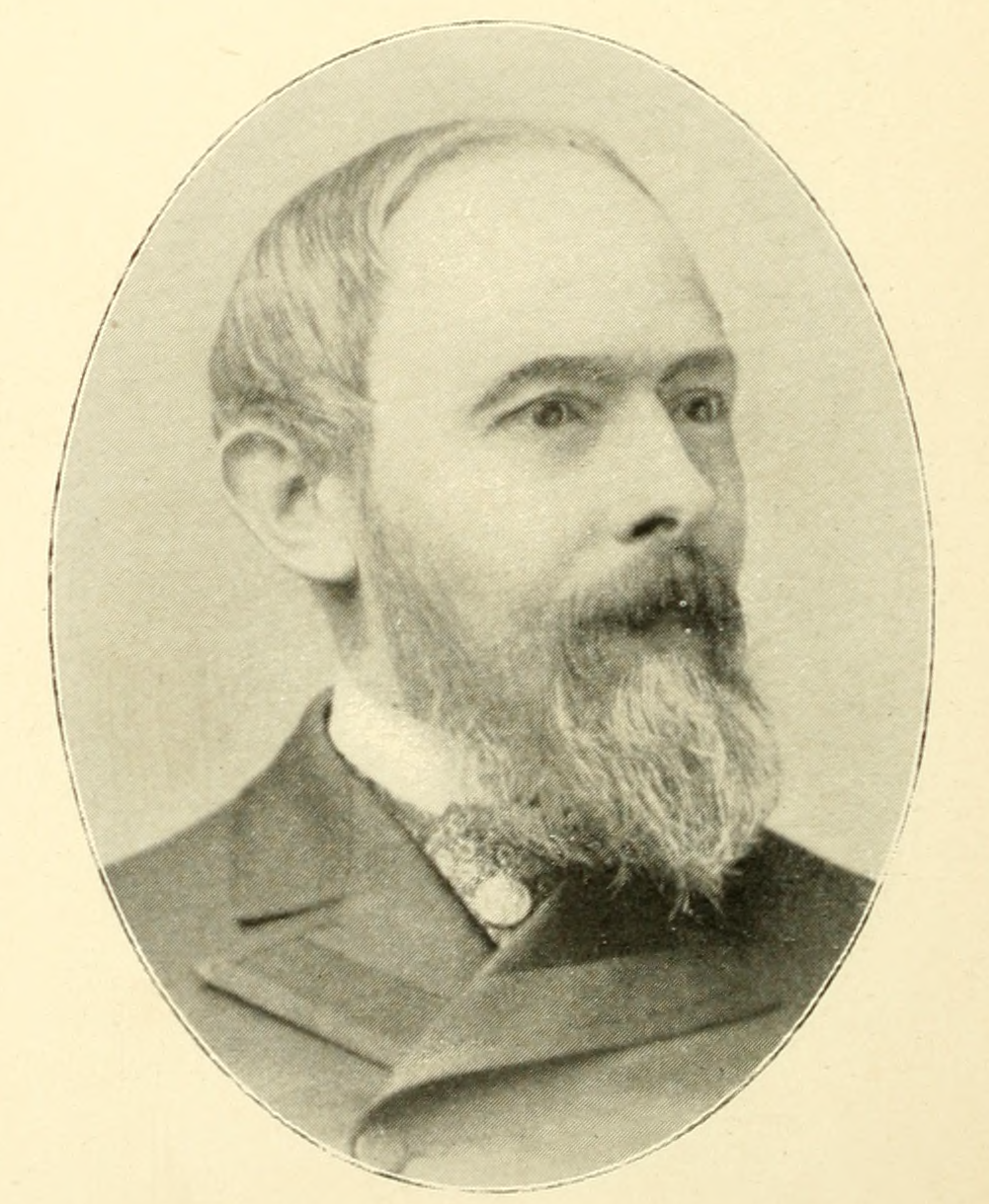
- Born: 15 February 1832
- Died: 13 April 1912

Robbins Little (born in Newport, Rhode Island, 15 February 1832; died there 13 April 1912) was a United States lawyer and librarian.

== Biography ==
He graduated from Yale in 1851, and was subsequently tutor in Greek there. He afterward studied in Harvard Law School, where he received the degree of LL.B., and practised law in New York City in partnership with William Winthrop, afterward judge advocate in the U. S. Army. From 1865 until 1869, he was instructor in international law at the U.S. Naval Academy. In 1873 he became an examiner of claims in the war department at Washington, D.C.

In 1878, he was elected superintendent of the Astor Library in New York City, and in 1883 became a trustee. During his administration, the library was greatly improved and enlarged, the endowment was increased by John Jacob Astor III, grandson of the founder, the hours of public admission were lengthened, and the facilities for research much extended, especially by the publication of a new catalog in four large volumes. He was superintendent until 1896, after the 1895 consolidation of the Astor Library into the New York Public Library.
